= George Reisman =

American economist (born 1937)

George Gerald Reisman
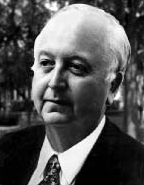
- Born: January 13, 1937 (age 89); New York City, New York

Academic background
- Doctoral advisor: Ludwig von Mises
- Influences: Adam Smith; David Ricardo; James Mill; John Stuart Mill; Carl Menger; Eugen von Böhm-Bawerk; Ludwig von Mises; Ayn Rand; Frédéric Bastiat; Henry Hazlitt

Academic work
- Discipline: Economics
- School or tradition: Objectivism; Austrian School
- Notable ideas: Primacy of profits, net consumption theory of profit, integration of Austrian and Classical Economics.

George Gerald Reisman (/ˈriːsmən/; born January 13, 1937) is an American economist. He is Professor Emeritus of Economics at Pepperdine University and the author of The Government Against the Economy (1979), which was praised by both F. A. Hayek and Henry Hazlitt, and Capitalism: A Treatise on Economics (1996). He is an advocate of free market or laissez-faire capitalism.

== Biography ==
Reisman was born in New York City and graduated from Columbia College in 1957. As a sophomore in 1954, he was a supporter of Sen. Joseph McCarthy and spoke at a testimonial dinner to McCarthy's chief aide, Roy Cohn, following the latter's resignation. At the dinner, according to Time magazine, Reisman, representing the Students for America, called Cohn "the American Dreyfus," adding: "Roy Cohn and Joe McCarthy will be redeemed when the people have taken back their government from the criminal alliance of Communists, Socialists, New Dealers and the Eisenhower-Dewey Republicans."

He earned his PhD from New York University under the direction of Ludwig von Mises, whose methodological work The Epistemological Problems of Economics Reisman translated from the German original to English.

In the 1980s, with his wife, psychologist Edith Packer, he organized the Jefferson School of Philosophy, Economics, and Psychology, which held several conferences and seminars, the first being held at University of California, San Diego. Its lecturers included Leonard Peikoff, Edward Teller, Petr Beckmann, Hans Sennholz, Bernard Siegan, Anne Wortham, Robert Hessen, Allan Gotthelf, David Kelley, John Ridpath, Harry Binswanger, Edwin Locke, Walter E. Williams, Mary Ann Sures, Andrew Bernstein and Peter Schwartz. Attendees of these conferences include later Objectivist writers Tara Smith and Lindsay Perigo.

Reisman was a student of Ayn Rand, whose influence on his thought and work he described as being as great as that of his mentor, Mises.
