= Objectivist periodicals =

Publications based on Objectivism

Objectivist periodicals are a variety of academic journals, magazines, and newsletters with an editorial perspective explicitly based on Ayn Rand's philosophy of Objectivism. Several early Objectivist periodicals were edited by Rand. She later endorsed two periodicals edited by associates, and a number of others have been founded since her death.

== Periodicals edited by Ayn Rand ==
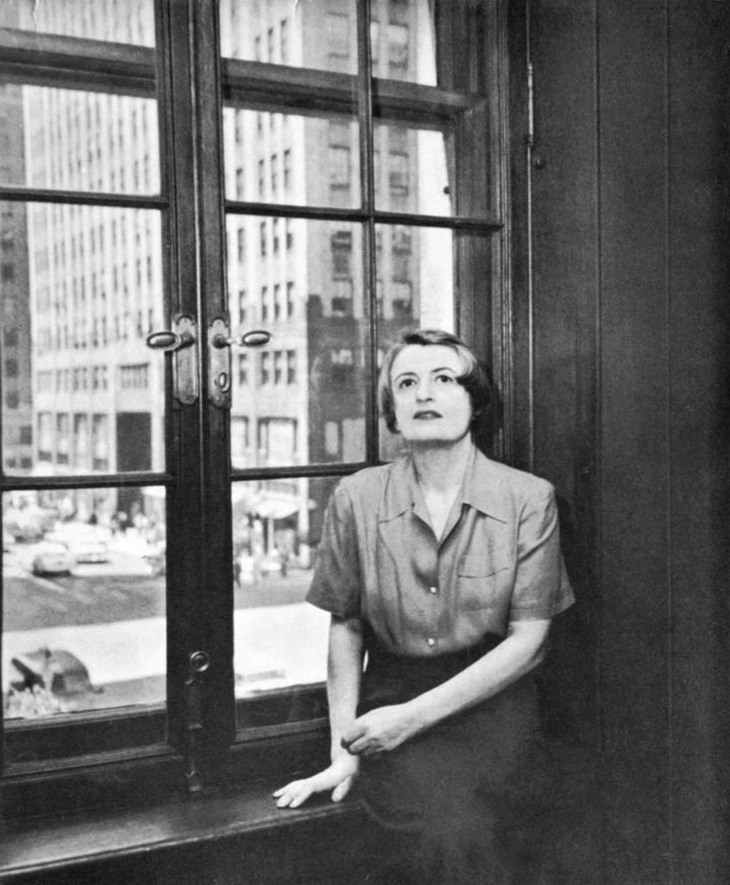
Ayn Rand in 1957

From 1961 to 1976, Rand was publisher and editor (sometimes co-editor) for three different periodicals: The Objectivist Newsletter, The Objectivist, and The Ayn Rand Letter. In addition to editing, Rand wrote many articles for these publications.

=== The Objectivist Newsletter ===
The first Objectivist periodical was The Objectivist Newsletter, a four-page newsletter that began publishing in January 1962. The newsletter was co-published by Ayn Rand and Nathaniel Branden and grew out of the previous success of the Nathaniel Branden Institute (NBI), which Branden had founded in 1958 (originally as Nathaniel Branden Lectures) to promote Objectivism. By late 1961, NBI had accumulated a mailing list of over 10,000 people, which was used to announce the newsletter.

A number of different writers contributed articles to The Objectivist Newsletter, including Martin Anderson, Barbara Branden, Edith Efron, Alan Greenspan, Robert Hessen, and Leonard Peikoff. However, the majority of the articles were written by either Ayn Rand or Nathaniel Branden.

In 1965, Rand and Branden decided to change the format of the publication. In October 1965, they announced that The Objectivist Newsletter would become The Objectivist. This was purely a change of name and format, with business operations, including subscriptions, continuing unchanged.

=== The Objectivist ===
In January 1966, The Objectivist replaced The Objectivist Newsletter, with Rand and Branden continuing as co-editors. The renamed publication used a sixteen-page magazine format in place of the previous newsletter format. The number of subscribers continued to climb, reaching 21,000 by the end of 1966. Contributors during this period included economists Alan Greenspan and George Reisman, historian Robert Hessen, neurophysiologist Robert Efron, novelists Erika Holzer and Kay Nolte Smith, and philosopher Leonard Peikoff.

In August 1968, Rand broke off her relationships with both Nathaniel and Barbara Branden. Nathaniel Branden resigned from The Objectivist and signed over his half of the magazine to her. In the May 1968 issue, which appeared at this time because the magazine was then behind schedule, Rand issued a public statement denouncing the Brandens and disassociating herself from them. From this point forward, Rand acted as the sole editor for the magazine, bringing in Peikoff as an associate editor.

In 1971, Rand decided on another format change, going back to a newsletter style publication, in the hope that this would allow her to reach a larger audience. The final issue of The Objectivist was published in September 1971.

=== The Ayn Rand Letter ===
In October 1971, Rand began publishing The Ayn Rand Letter. This new publication was produced in the style of a typewritten letter and was published fortnightly. Rand's initial hopes for reaching a wider audience with the newsletter format were not fulfilled. The Letter actually lost subscribers compared to The Objectivist, largely because of the Letter's higher subscription price. The newsletter was usually four or six pages long with a single major article per issue, plus occasional announcements and the continuing "Objectivist Calendar" entries. Rand wrote most of the articles herself, in addition to acting as editor and publisher. Leonard Peikoff served as a contributing editor and wrote the articles for six of the newsletter's eighty-one issues.

Beginning in 1973, outside circumstances began to cause delays in production. In March 1973, Rand discovered that a sister she believed to have died was in fact still alive and in the Soviet Union. Rand worked hard to arrange a visit to the United States for her sister. When her sister finally arrived, their reunion turned into fighting over political and philosophical differences. As Hessen described it, "This incident, stretching across eight months, took a heavy toll on her writing and publication schedule, which allocated no time for unexpected interruptions." Several issues of the Letter published during this period bore a postscript: "This Letter was written later than the date that appears on its heading."

Rand attempted to bring the Letter back on schedule, but further delays occurred when she was diagnosed with lung cancer. Each issue continued to bear the date when it should have appeared on the original fortnightly schedule, with the "written later" postscript. By the middle of 1975, issues were appearing eight months behind schedule, with the issue dated August 26, 1974 actually being written in May 1975. In that issue, Peikoff announced that the Letter would become a monthly publication, rather than fortnightly. Rand was unable to sustain this schedule either, and announced at the end of 1975 that the newsletter would cease publication. The final issue appeared in February 1976. It was the last periodical that Rand edited, although she did serve as an adviser to The Objectivist Forum when that magazine began in 1980.

=== Article reprints ===
The articles from Rand's three periodicals did not appear only in their respective pages. They were frequently reprinted as pamphlets. Initially these were sold by the NBI Book Service, an affiliate of the Nathaniel Branden Institute. When NBI and its affiliates were closed in 1968, a new Objectivist Book Service began selling the reprints. The Objectivist Book Service later sold reprints from The Ayn Rand Letter until shortly after that publication was discontinued.

In addition to pamphlets, many articles from these periodicals also appeared in books. Articles from The Objectivist Newsletter by Rand and Nathaniel Branden made up most of the content for The Virtue of Selfishness. Rand's next book, Capitalism: The Unknown Ideal, included articles from her and Branden, plus Greenspan and Hessen. Reprints of Rand's articles also appeared in The Romantic Manifesto, The New Left (later revised as Return of the Primitive), Philosophy: Who Needs It, and The Voice of Reason. The content of Rand's Introduction to Objectivist Epistemology was serialized in The Objectivist, and the published book also includes an article by Leonard Peikoff reprinted from that same magazine. Peikoff's articles for The Ayn Rand Letter were material later incorporated into his book The Ominous Parallels.

In 1969, a brief dispute arose between Rand and Nathaniel Branden, over the use of some of his articles from The Objectivist. The copyrights for the articles had been registered in the name of the magazine. When Branden signed over his interest in the company to Rand, he believed they had an understanding that he could re-use the material in his articles for his planned book, The Psychology of Self-Esteem. Rand threatened to withhold her consent to use the material, but took no action when Branden's publisher decided to go forward anyway.

All three of the periodicals edited by Rand were later published in hardcover collections by Palo Alto Book Service. In 2001, all the articles by Rand and Peikoff were incorporated into the Objectivism Research CD-ROM, a searchable e-book of their writings (which was subsequently discontinued).

== Other Objectivist periodicals ==
=== The Intellectual Activist ===
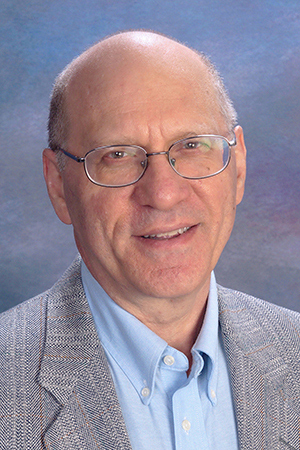
Intellectual Activist founder Peter Schwartz

The Intellectual Activist (TIA) was founded in 1979 by Peter Schwartz. It was subsequently edited by Robert Stubblefield (1991–1996) and then by Robert Tracinski. From 1985 onward, TIA was aligned with the Ayn Rand Institute, but in 2005 Tracinski stopped working for the institute, citing internal disputes about political issues as one of his reasons. TIA ceased publishing as a print issue and published only as an online newsletter called TIA Daily. In 2012, Tracinski changed its name to The Tracinski Letter.

=== The Objectivist Forum ===
The Objectivist Forum was an Objectivist bimonthly journal published from February 1980 through December 1987.

Rand helped establish it and served as its philosophic consultant until her death in 1982. Harry Binswanger was publisher and editor; Peikoff served as consulting editor.

=== The Objective Standard ===
The Objective Standard is a quarterly journal on culture and politics founded by Craig Biddle and Sidney J. Gunst Jr. in 2006, which describes itself as providing "commentary from an Objectivist perspective." Biddle serves as editor for The Objective Standard. Several fellows from the Ayn Rand Institute, such as Yaron Brook, Andrew Bernstein, Tara Smith, Elan Journo, and Alex Epstein, have written for the journal.

=== The Undercurrent ===
The Undercurrent was founded in 2005 but has been inactive since 2019. It was available at college campuses and other outlets. It was a student-run, 8-page quarterly that applied the philosophy of Objectivism to current events.

=== Others ===
Other Objectivist periodicals include Full Context, Objectivity, and The New Individualist.

In 1988, Karen Reedstrom (later Minto) began publishing a newsletter for the Objectivist Club of Eastern Michigan. In 1990 the newsletter became Full Context, which billed itself as "An International Objectivist Publication." The magazine was published until October 2000. Contributors included Chris Matthew Sciabarra and Tibor Machan, and the magazine published a number of interviews with people associated with Objectivism, including Barbara Branden, Nathaniel Branden, Erika Holzer, and David Kelley.

== See also ==
- Bibliography of Ayn Rand and Objectivism
- The Journal of Ayn Rand Studies, an independent journal that discusses Rand and her ideas.

== Works cited ==
- Branden, Barbara (1986). The Passion of Ayn Rand. Garden City, New York: Doubleday & Company. ISBN 0-385-19171-5. OCLC 12614728.
- Burns, Jennifer (2009). Goddess of the Market: Ayn Rand and the American Right. New York: Oxford University Press. ISBN 978-0-19-532487-7. OCLC 313665028.
- Gladstein, Mimi Reisel (1999). The New Ayn Rand Companion. Westport, Connecticut: Greenwood Press. ISBN 0-313-30321-5. OCLC 40359365.
- Heller, Anne C. (2009). Ayn Rand and the World She Made. New York: Doubleday. ISBN 978-0-385-51399-9. OCLC 229027437.
- Hessen, Robert (1999). "Objectivist, 1962–1976". In Lora, Ronald; Henry, William Longton (eds.). The Conservative Press in Twentieth-Century America. Westport, Connecticut: Greenwood Publishing Group. pp. 349–356. ISBN 0-313-21390-9. OCLC 40481045.
- Paxton, Michael (1998). Ayn Rand: A Sense of Life (The Companion Book). Layton, Utah: Gibbs Smith. ISBN 0-87905-845-5. OCLC 38048196.
- Peikoff, Leonard (August 26, 1974). "(untitled announcement)". The Ayn Rand Letter. 3 (24).
- Perinn, Vincent L. (1990). Ayn Rand: First Descriptive Bibliography. Rockville, Maryland: Quill & Brush. ISBN 0-9610494-8-0. OCLC 23216055.
- Rand, Ayn (May 1968). "To Whom It May Concern". The Objectivist. 7 (5): 449–456.
- Rand, Ayn (November–December 1975). "A Last Survey: Part I". The Ayn Rand Letter. 4 (2).
- Rand, Ayn (February 1980). "To the Readers of The Objectivist Forum". The Objectivist Forum. 1 (1).
- Sciabarra, Chris Matthew (1995). Ayn Rand: The Russian Radical. University Park, Pennsylvania: Pennsylvania State University Press. ISBN 978-0-271-01440-1.
