= Objectivism: The Philosophy of Ayn Rand =

1991 book by Leonard Peikoff

- Cover of the first edition, showing photograph of Rand in her New York office, 1974
- Author: Leonard Peikoff
- Language: English
- Series: Ayn Rand Library
- Subject: Objectivism
- Publisher: Dutton
- Publication date: 1991
- Publication place: United States
- Media type: Print (Hardcover and Paperback)
- Pages: 493 (first edition)
- ISBN: 0-525-93380-8 (hardcover); ISBN 0-452-01101-9 (paperback)
- OCLC: 23647748

Objectivism: The Philosophy of Ayn Rand is a 1991 book by the philosopher Leonard Peikoff, in which the author discusses the ideas of his mentor, Ayn Rand. Peikoff describes it as "the first comprehensive statement" of Rand's philosophy, Objectivism. The book is based on a series of lecture courses that Peikoff first gave in 1976 and that Rand publicly endorsed. Peikoff states that only Rand was qualified to write the definitive statement of her philosophic system, and that the book should be seen as an interpretation "by her best student and chosen heir." The book is volume six of the "Ayn Rand Library" series edited by Peikoff.

== Summary ==
Peikoff discusses Rand's views on metaphysics and epistemology, which she considered the fundamental branches of philosophy. He also covers Rand's views on ethics, politics and esthetics, which she considered to be derived from those fundamentals. In an epilogue titled "The Duel between Plato and Aristotle", Peikoff discusses the Objectivist philosophy of history.

== Reception ==
Objectivism: The Philosophy of Ayn Rand was praised by many of Peikoff's fellow Objectivist thinkers as a comprehensive presentation of Rand's philosophy. Harry Binswanger, writing in the Objectivist magazine The Intellectual Activist, credited Peikoff with providing the first "full, systematic, non-fiction expression" of Objectivism, as well as "many electrifying ideas, elegant formulations, and majestic overviews". In a treatise defending Rand's ethics, the philosopher Tara Smith took Peikoff's book as "an authoritative source of [Rand's] views". Edward W. Younkins wrote that Rand's ideas were "authoritatively described and systematically explained" by Peikoff. According to non-Objectivist Rand scholar Mimi Reisel Gladstein, "The reader who wants a comprehensive view of orthodox Objectivism as it has evolved since Rand's death should start with Peikoff's book."

Peikoff's "orthodox" approach to Rand's ideas drew criticism. Rand scholar Chris Matthew Sciabarra described Peikoff's approach as "noncritical". Non-orthodox Objectivist philosopher David Kelley wrote that Peikoff's introduction of the book as both a "definitive statement" and "interpreted" was "a tortured effort" based on fallacies. The philosopher Leslie Armour, writing in Library Journal, called Peikoff an "authorized evangelist" and "official expositor" who was too "bound to the received word" to write a good defense of Rand's ideas.

David Ramsay Steele, writing in Liberty, described Peikoff's effort as "slapdash" and filled with positions that were "wrong, vacuous or trite". The philosopher Henry B. Veatch wrote that Peikoff should have "paid a more discerning and discriminating attention to present-day academic philosophy," instead of "simply brushing academic ethics aside".
