= Nathaniel Branden Institute =

Objectivist organization

The Nathaniel Branden Institute (NBI), originally Nathaniel Branden Lectures, was an organization founded by Nathaniel Branden in 1958 to promote Ayn Rand's philosophy of Objectivism. The institute was responsible for many Objectivist lectures and presentations across the United States. Many of those associated with NBI worked on the Objectivist magazines, The Objectivist Newsletter and The Objectivist.

There were several subsidiary companies, such as NBI Press (a publishing arm that printed several plays as well as special editions of Calumet "K" and Victor Hugo's The Man Who Laughs with introductions by Rand); NBI Book Service (which sold Objectivist books and books by non-Objectivists with similar views in a particular area); and NBI Art Reproductions (art by Frank O'Connor, Joan Mitchell Blumenthal, and the portrait of Rand by Ilona Royce Smithkin). NBI also reprinted some of Rand's speeches and interviews, along with articles from The Objectivist Newsletter and The Objectivist, in pamphlet format. There was an attempt to set up an NBI Theater in early 1967. The plan was to produce The Fountainhead as a play, based on a script by Barbara Branden, but the project was shut down in 1968.

The institute disbanded after Nathaniel Branden's break with Rand in August 1968. Its closest analogues today are the Ayn Rand Institute and The Atlas Society. From 1996 until his death in 2014, Nathaniel Branden was associated with the latter organization.

== Lectures and courses ==
NBI presented a variety of lecture series. Many of the presentations were also provided as recordings, which were sold and distributed around the country for those who could not attend a live NBI lecture. The lectures delivered by NBI included the following:

- Basic Principles of Objectivism by Nathaniel Branden
- Basic Principles of Objectivist Psychology by Nathaniel Branden
- A Critical Analysis of Contemporary Psychology by Nathaniel Branden
- The Psychology of Romantic Love by Nathaniel Branden
- The Psychology of Mental Illness by Nathaniel Branden
- Contemporary Theories of Neurosis by Nathaniel Branden
- The Principles of Efficient Thinking by Barbara Branden
- The Objectivist Esthetics by Ayn Rand
- The Economics of a Free Society by Alan Greenspan
- A Critical History of Philosophy by Leonard Peikoff
- History of Modern Philosophy by Leonard Peikoff
- History of Ancient Philosophy by Leonard Peikoff
- Contemporary Philosophy by Leonard Peikoff
- Objectivism's Theory of Knowledge by Leonard Peikoff
- The Esthetics of the Visual Arts by Mary Ann (Rukavina) Sures
- Principles of Child Rearing by Reva Fox
- The Principles and Practice of Non-Fiction Writing by Edith Efron
- Nazism and Contemporary America: Ominous Parallels by Leonard Peikoff
- Three Plays by Ayn Rand by Nathaniel Branden
