= Objectivism and homosexuality =

Views regarding homosexuality

Ayn Rand, author and developer of Objectivism, held controversial views regarding homosexuality and gender roles. Although Rand personally viewed homosexuality negatively, considering it immoral and disgusting, she endorsed non-discrimination protection for homosexuals in the public (or government) sphere while opposing laws against discrimination in the private sector on the basis of individual rights.

== Ayn Rand ==
Rand only mentioned homosexuality twice in her published writings, both times in reference to lesbians. In 1971, she published an essay called "The Age of Envy", which included criticism of the women's liberation movement. Rand's criticisms included denouncing "sex views" that she considered "hideous", including "proclaim[ing] spiritual sisterhood with lesbians". Later that year, Rand published another essay that criticized women's liberation for forming a "common front with lesbians and prostitutes". Additionally, in a 1963 article for The Objectivist Newsletter (later reprinted in The Virtue of Selfishness), Rand's protege Nathaniel Branden wrote about supposed conflicts between the moral and the practical, giving as an example: "the adolescent who flees into homosexuality because he has been taught that sex is evil and that women are to be worshiped, but not desired".

Rand explained her views in more detail in response to questions from the audience at two Ford Hall Forum lectures she gave at Northeastern University. In her 1968 lecture, she said, "I do not approve of such practices or regard them as necessarily moral, but it is improper for the law to interfere with a relationship between consenting adults." She did not directly address anti-discrimination laws that prohibit discrimination based on sexual orientation, but in general she was opposed to laws that prohibit discrimination in the private sector.

Rand's heir Leonard Peikoff stated that Rand had friends that she knew were homosexual, including ones that she considered Objectivists. However, the negative attitudes towards homosexuality expressed by Rand and Branden were copied by many of her followers, including some who attempted to repress their own homosexual feelings.

== After Rand's death ==
After Rand's death in 1982, her heir, Leonard Peikoff, publicly disagreed with some of her views. Peikoff argued that homosexuality itself is not open to moral judgment. Other contemporary Objectivists generally continue to support the view that, while government should not discriminate for or against homosexuals in any way, private individuals and private organizations should be free to do so, which is generally in keeping with most strains of libertarian and classical liberal thought.

In 1983, Branden wrote that Rand was "absolutely and totally ignorant” about homosexuality. Branden added that he saw her perspective "as calamitous, as wrong, as reckless, as irresponsible, and as cruel, and as one which I know has hurt too many people who ... looked up to her and assumed that if she would make that strong a statement she must have awfully good reasons."

According to an FAQ from The Atlas Society (formerly The Objectivist Center):

While many conservatives believe that homosexuality should be outlawed and many liberals believe that homosexuals should be given special rights, Objectivism holds that as long as no force is involved, people have the right to do as they please in sexual matters, whether or not their behavior is considered by others to be or is in fact moral. And since individual rights are grounded in the nature of human beings as human beings, homosexuals do not deserve any more or less rights than heterosexuals.

Objectivist psychotherapist Michael J. Hurd supports gay marriage as falling under the rights of individuals to associate voluntarily. Unlike Rand, however, he does not view homosexuality as immoral, stating that "a gay marriage... though unconventional and highly controversial, can be a loving and highly satisfying union between two individuals." Objectivist psychologist Ellen Kenner has expressed opinions similar to those of Hurd.

Chartered affiliates of the Objectivist Party, a minor political party in the United States, adopted platforms opposing government-sanctioned discrimination on the basis of sexual orientation, favoring legalization of same-sex marriage, and favoring elimination of the military's policy of "Don't Ask, Don't Tell".

In a critical study of Rand in 2019, Lisa Duggan said that despite Rand's negative view of homosexuality, the sexual liberation of characters in her novels and her "libertarian rages against the strictures of family, church, and state" are appealing to LGBT readers.

== See also ==
- Libertarian perspectives on LGBT rights
