= Ethical solipsism =

Ethical solipsism is a form of personal morality that holds that no other moral judgement exists or matters apart from one's own individual moral judgement. It is related to ethical egoism but with the difference that the ethical egoist thinks that individuals should abide by the morality of social order to the extent that it is in their own self-interest to do so.

Due to the solipsistic uncertainty regarding the existence of external beings, it is possible for the ethical solipsist to adhere to external moral standards, for other beings may be real and conscious.

It has been suggested by Wojciech Załuski that a true ethical solipsist will be an adult who will belittle the reality of other people and show a negative ethical evaluation; this could include extreme narcissism or egotism and the Marquise de Sade's philosophie de libertinage may be one example of this.

Sami Pihlström has suggested that an ethical solipsist will have an attitude of both humility and responsibility for others.

== See also ==
- Max Stirner
