= John Ridpath =

Canadian historian (1936–2021)

John B. Ridpath
- Born: May 19, 1936; Canada
- Died: 23 March 2021 (aged 84); Canada

Academic background
- Education: University of Toronto (BS, MBA); University of Virginia (PhD)
- Influences: Ayn Rand

Academic work
- Discipline: Economics, intellectual history
- School or tradition: Objectivism

John B. Ridpath (/ˈrɪdpæθ/; 19 May 1936 – 23 March 2021) was a Canadian intellectual historian. He was an Objectivist and an associate professor of economics and intellectual history at York University in Toronto. He also taught courses at Duke University.

== Biography ==
Ridpath attended Toronto's Upper Canada College (Head Prefect, 1955) and then later the University of Toronto, from which he received both an undergraduate degree in Engineering and an MBA; he also set Canadian national swimming records and captained the University of Toronto swim team during this time.

He obtained his doctorate in economics from the University of Virginia (1974), but his major work was in the area of intellectual history, where he emphasized the power of philosophical ideas in setting the course of history.

Despite receiving an award by the Ontario Council of University Faculty Associations for outstanding contribution to university teaching, he was nearly terminated in the early 1970s for his radical outspoken views and his obvious contempt for the popular intellectual movements of the late 20th century. However, with support from Nobel laureate Friedrich von Hayek, after a lengthy struggle, he was given tenure and promoted, rather than being fired. Upon his retirement in 2001 he was named professor of the year by the university and honoured with a nomination for Canadian professor of the year.

Ridpath was an acquaintance of Ayn Rand and served on the board of directors of the Ayn Rand Institute from 1994 until his retirement in 2011. He authored a two-part article on Friedrich Nietzsche for The Objectivist Forum, which became the basis of a longer treatment devoted to exposing Nietzsche's irrationalism and brooding fatalism, arguing that Nietzsche at root was not an individualist and that Ayn Rand's pro-reason, pro-volition philosophy is actually the opposite of Nietzsche's.

He was an expert on the history of the founding of the United States and on its Founding Fathers, lecturing at several Objectivist conferences on their achievements. A lifelong admirer of American Revolutionary ideals, he named his firstborn son "Jefferson" after Thomas Jefferson.

In economics, two of his most influential lectures were "Keynes and the Death of Gold," and "The Philosophical Origins of Antitrust," which attacked Frank Knight's notion of "pure and perfect competition." He also regularly gave economics courses at York University, and lectured on Say's law at a conference in the UK in the 1990s.

Throughout his career, Ridpath argued for laissez-faire capitalism, not just as the most practical but also the only moral social system. He defended the morality of capitalism against socialism in many debates on college campuses across North America including Yale University, Harvard University, the University of Chicago, UCLA and Berkeley, and notably against former premier of Ontario Bob Rae.

He and his wife, Virginia Grant Ridpath, had three children. He lived in Toronto from 1967 until his final year, when he moved to a nursing home in Windsor Ontario. He was a lifelong summer resident of Canoe Lake in Ontario's Algonquin Provincial Park.
