= The Ominous Parallels =

1982 book by Leonard Peikoff

- Cover of the first edition
- Author: Leonard Peikoff
- Cover artist: C. Lichty
- Language: English
- Series: Ayn Rand Library
- Subjects: Nazi Germany; Politics of the United States; Philosophy
- Publisher: Stein and Day
- Publication date: 1982
- Publication place: United States
- Media type: Print (Hardcover and Paperback)
- Pages: 383
- ISBN: 0-8128-2850-X
- OCLC: 488363398

The Ominous Parallels: The End of Freedom in America is a 1982 book by the philosopher Leonard Peikoff, in which the author compares the culture of the United States with the culture of Germany leading up to the Nazis.

== Publication history ==
The hardcover first edition was published by Stein and Day in 1982. A paperback edition was published by New American Library in 1983.

== Reception ==
German expatriate Hiltgunt Zassenhaus gave the book a positive review, saying it showed the importance of working to build a free society. In a Chicago Tribune profile of Peikoff, Rogers Worthington called it "a fascinating weave of German history, philosophic determinism, and Objectivist polemic". The reviewer for The Indianapolis Star found Peikoff's description of the parallels interesting, but was disappointed that his proposed remedy was Rand's Objectivist philosophy.
