= The Atlas Society =

US-based nonprofit organization

- Formation: 1990
- Type: Research and Education Organization
- Legal status: 501(c)(3)
- Purpose: Ayn Rand and Objectivism
- Headquarters: 1038 Miwok Dr Lodi, CA
- Location: Lodi, California
- Coordinates: 38°08′49″N 121°16′03″W
- CEO: Jennifer Grossman
- Website: www.atlassociety.org

The Atlas Society (TAS) is an American 501(c)(3) nonprofit organization that promotes the philosophy of Ayn Rand. It is part of the Objectivist movement that split off from the Ayn Rand Institute in 1990 due to disagreements over whether Objectivism was a "closed system" or an "open system". David Kelley is the founder of TAS, and Jennifer Grossman is its current CEO.

== History ==
In the late 1980s, philosopher David Kelley was affiliated with the Ayn Rand Institute (ARI), which was founded 1985 to advocate Rand's philosophy of Objectivism. After disputes with ARI founder Leonard Peikoff and board chairman Peter Schwartz, ARI cut ties with Kelley and warned others in the Objectivist movement not to associate with him. In response, Kelley and former ARI advisor George Walsh co-founded the Institute for Objectivist Studies in 1990; it was later renamed The Atlas Society. TAS positions itself as a more open and tolerant alternative to the "orthodox" ARI. ARI and TAS are the most prominent American organizations advocating for Objectivism, although TAS is smaller and not as well funded as its rival.

The organization's activities have included creating written and recorded material about Objectivism, support for student groups, and media appearances. Each summer TAS organizes an annual conference called the "Summer Seminar", and the group formerly published a magazine called The New Individualist. The Objectivist Oral History Project conducts recorded interviews with persons involved in the history of the Objectivist movement.

In 2011, Aaron Day took over as the organization's operational executive. On March 1, 2016, TAS announced Jennifer Grossman as its new CEO.

== Names ==
The organization was founded as the Institute for Objectivist Studies in 1990. It was renamed The Objectivist Center in 1999. That same year, the Center founded "The Atlas Society" as an interest group targeted at people who read Rand's novels but were not familiar with other Objectivist literature. On June 5, 2006, the organization announced its decision "to use The Atlas Society as our official name, which will help us promote our ideas to Rand readers as well as to the general public, while reserving The Objectivist Center name for our more academic and scholarly activities."
