= Tibor Machan =

Hungarian-American philosopher (1939–2016)

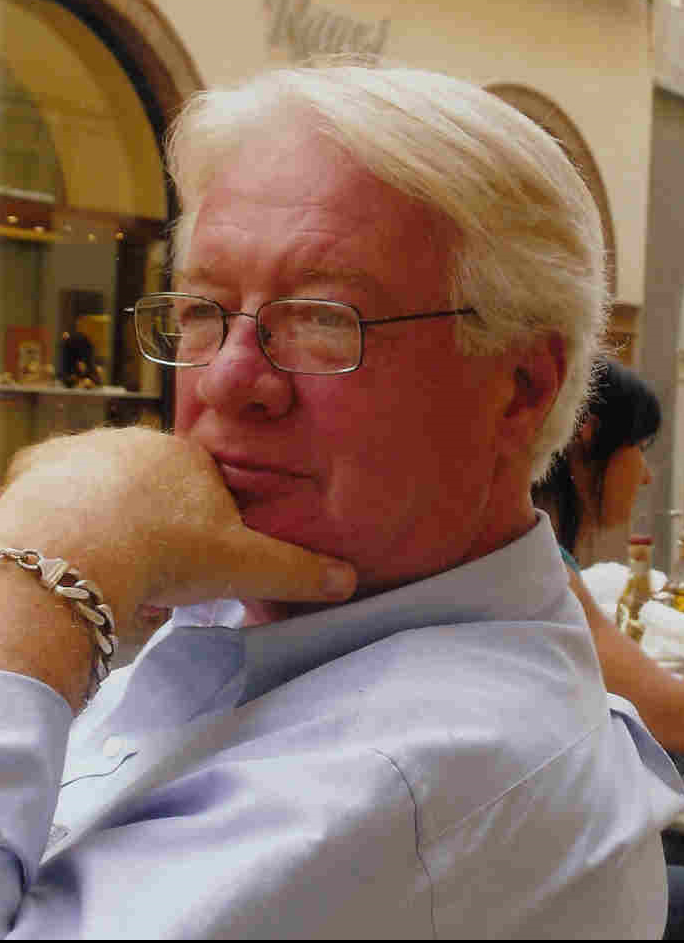
- Born: Tibor Richard Machan; 18 March 1939; Budapest, Hungary
- Died: 24 March 2016 (aged 77); New York, New York, U.S.

Education
- Education: Claremont McKenna College (BA); New York University (MA); University of California, Santa Barbara (PhD)

Philosophical work
- Era: Contemporary philosophy
- Region: Western philosophy
- School: Objectivism, analytic philosophy, individualism, ethical egoism, virtue ethics, aretaic turn, eudaimonism
- Main interests: Political philosophy, individual rights, egoism, meta-ethics
- Notable ideas: Argument from species normality, egoism and rights, egoism and generosity

Tibor Richard Machan (/ˈtiːbɔːr məˈkæn/; 18 March 1939 – 24 March 2016) was a Hungarian-American philosopher. A professor emeritus in the department of philosophy at Auburn University, Machan held the R. C. Hoiles Chair of Business Ethics and Free Enterprise at the Argyros School of Business & Economics at Chapman University in Orange, California until 31 December 2014.

He was a research fellow at the Hoover Institution at Stanford University, a research fellow at the Independent Institute, an adjunct scholar at the Cato Institute, and an adjunct faculty member of the Ludwig von Mises Institute. Machan was a syndicated and freelance columnist; author of more than one hundred scholarly papers and more than forty books, among them Why is Everyone Else Wrong? (Springer, 2008). He was, until spring 2015, senior contributing editor at The Daily Bell. He was senior fellow at the Heartland Institute in Arlington Heights, Illinois.

Machan rejected any division of libertarianism into left-wing and right-wing. He held that, by its nature, libertarianism is about political liberty for all individuals to do whatever is peaceful and non-aggressive. Machan was a minarchist.

== Life ==
Machan was born in Budapest. Machan's father hired a smuggler to get him out of Hungary when he was 14 years of age; he came to the United States three years later, in 1956. By 1965, Machan graduated from Claremont McKenna College (then Claremont Men's College). He took his Masters of Arts in philosophy at New York University from 1965 to 1966, and his Ph.D. in philosophy at University of California, Santa Barbara, 1966–1971.

He taught as an assistant professor of philosophy at California State University, Bakersfield from 1970 to 1972. In 1970, with Robert W. Poole, Jr. and Manuel Klausner, he purchased Reason magazine, which has since become the leading libertarian periodical in America. Machan edited Reason for two years and was the editor of Reason Papers, an annual journal of interdisciplinary normative studies, for 25 years.

He was a visiting professor at the United States Military Academy at West Point in 1992–1993 and taught at universities in California, New York, Switzerland, and Alabama. He lectured in Europe, South Africa, New Zealand, Budapest, Hungary, Prague, Czech Republic, Azerbaijan, Republic of Georgia, Armenia, and Latin America on business ethics and political philosophy.

He sat on the advisory boards for several foundations and think tanks, and served on the founding Board of the Jacob J. Javits Graduate Fellowship Program of the U. S. Department of Education. Machan was selected as the 2003 President of the American Society for Value Inquiry, and delivered the presidential address on 29 December 2002, in Philadelphia, at the Eastern Division meetings of the American Philosophical Association, titled "Aristotle & Business." He was on the board of the Association for Private Enterprise Education for several terms.

Machan wrote a memoir, The Man Without a Hobby: Adventures of a Gregarious Egoist (Hamilton Books, 2004; 2nd edition 2012). On 24 March 2016, he died at the age of 77.

== Academic work ==
Machan's work usually focused on ethics and political philosophy, specifically natural rights theory, as in works such as Individuals and Their Rights (Open Court, 1989) and Libertarianism Defended (Ashgate, 2006). He defended the arguments of Ayn Rand for ethical egoism, and also wrote frequently on business ethics, a field in which he deployed a neo-Aristotelian ethical stance whereby commercial and business conduct gain their moral standing by constituting extensions of the virtues of productivity and prudence. He argued that the field presupposes the institution of the right to private property (one cannot trade what one does not own or hasn't been authorized to trade by the owner) in the works, The Business of Commerce, Examining an Honorable Profession, and A Primer on Business Ethics, both with James Chesher, and The Morality of Business, A Profession of Human Wealth Care (Springer, 2007).

Machan also wrote in the field of epistemology. His main focus was to challenge the conception of human knowledge whereby to know that P amounts to having reached a final, perfect, timeless, and finished understanding of P. Instead, Machan developed Ayn Rand's contextual conception of human knowledge (from Rand's Introduction to Objectivist Epistemology), but also draws on the insights of J. L. Austin, from his paper "Other Minds", and Gilbert Harman, from his book Thought, in works such as Objectivity (Ashgate, 2004). Machan worked on the problem of free will and defended a secular, naturalist (but not materialist) notion of human initiative in his books The Pseudo-Science of B. F. Skinner (1974; 2007) and Initiative: Human Agency and Society (2000).

Machan argued against animal rights in his widely reprinted paper "Do Animals Have Rights?" (1991) and in his book Putting Humans First: Why We Are Nature's Favorite (2004); he also wrote on the ethics of animal treatment in the same work. He was also a skeptic as to whether governments are able to help with global warming and whether human beings have made significant contributions to climate change. On 1 May 2011, Machan was featured in a three-hour interview on C-Span 2's In Depth program as its selection of an author from the Western United States of America.

Machan has argued in a 2008 article that unilateral American intervention has done more harm than good.

== Personal life ==
Machan lived in Silverado Canyon, California. He was previously married to Marty Zupan. He had three children and four grandchildren.

== Bibliography ==
- The pseudo-science of B.F. Skinner. New Rochelle, N.Y.: Arlington House Publishers. 1974.
- The Libertarian Alternative (Nelson-Hall, 1974)
- Human Rights and Human Liberties (Nelson-Hall, 1975)
- "Recent Work in Ethical Egoism," American Philosophical Quarterly, Vol. 16, No. 1, 1979, pp. 1–15.
- The Libertarian Reader (Rowman & Littlefield, 1982)
- Individuals and Their Rights (Open Court, 1989)
- Capitalism and Individualism: Reframing the Argument for the Free Society (St. Martin's Publishing Co. & Harvester Wheatsheaf Books, 1990)
- Private Rights and Public Illusions (Transaction Publishers for the Independent Institute, 1994)
- Classical Individualism (Routledge, 1998)
- Generosity; Virtue in the Civil Society (Cato Institute, 1998)
- Putting Humans First: Why We Are Nature's Favorite (Rowman & Littlefield Publishers, 2004)
- Libertarianism Defended (Ashgate, 2006)
- The Promise of Liberty (Lexington, 2009)
- (co-authored with Rainer Ebert) "Innocent Threats and the Moral Problem of Carnivorous Animals," Journal of Applied Philosophy 29 (May 2012), pp. 146–59.
- "Impractical pragmatism". Philosophy Now. 95: 30. March–April 2013.

== See also ==
- Objectivism and libertarianism
- Libertarianism in the United States
- List of American philosophers
