= Marty Zupan =

American journalist (born 1949)

Martha "Marty" L. Zupan (born April 5, 1949) is the President Emeritus of the Institute for Humane Studies.

== Biography ==
Zupan received a Bachelor of Arts in philosophy and psychology from the State University of New York at Fredonia.

In 1975, she joined Reason as a book review editor, became associate editor in 1978, and served through the 1980s as managing editor and editor-in-chief, leaving in 1989. In 1987, Zupan wrote Liberated Cooking: Rabble-Rousing Recipes from Assorted Libertarian Luminaries with Lou Villadsen. She joined Institute for Humane Studies in 1989 as a vice president, and in 2001 she was appointed president of IHS. She stepped down as president in 2016. For a year after that, she served as a senior advisor.

Zupan's work has been published in the Philosophy of Science, the Journal of the History of the Behavioral Sciences, Occasional Review, and the New York Times Book Review.

She serves on the Advisory Committee of the Pope Center and the Advisory Council of the Talent Market.

== Personal life ==
Zupan was married for several years to philosopher Tibor Machan.
