= Shlomo Kalish =

Israeli businessman

- שלמה קאליש
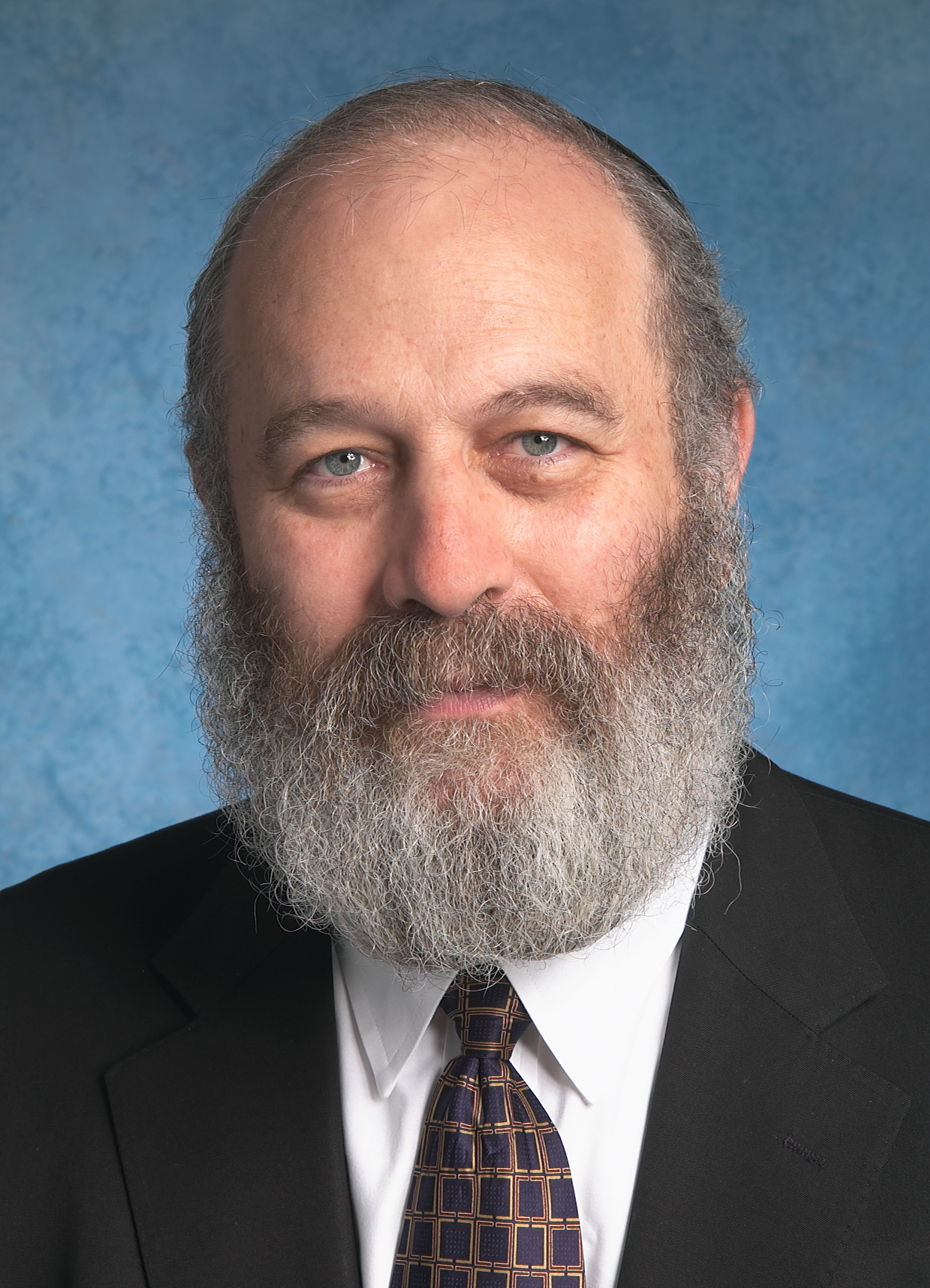
- Born: 1952 (age 73–74); Haifa, Israel
- Occupation: Hi-Tech Investor
- Known for: Work in Mathematical Economics

Shlomo Kalish (Hebrew: שלמה קאליש; born 1952) is an Israeli businessman. He is the Founder and Managing Partner at Jerusalem Global Ventures and a Managing Partner of Corundum Open Innovation Ltd.

== Biography ==
Shlomo Kalish was born in 1952 in Haifa, Israel to Issacher Dov and Haya Kalish- both Holocaust survivors. Kalish served as a fighter pilot from 1971–1975, which included the Yom Kippur War.

In 1977, Kalish received a B.Sc. in Mathematics from Tel Aviv University. He completed an M.Sc. and a PhD at MIT's Sloan School. In 1981 he began teaching at the University of Rochester. In 1985 he joined the Management Faculty of Tel Aviv University, and established a hi-tech consulting business.

== Business career ==
In 1999 Kalish founded Jerusalem Global Ventures, a Jerusalem-based VC. Kalish also served as General Partner of Concord Ventures I, LP from 1997–1999. Kalish led investments in Saifun Semiconductors, Oridion Medical, Oren Semiconductors, Creo, QXL, Mellanox Technologies, Picturevision and Galileo. In 1999, Kalish also founded Yazam.com, one of the accelerators aimed at internet projects in Israel.

== Philanthropy ==
Kalish is the founder and a board member of Shalom Beineinu, a charity organization.
