= Leonard Peikoff =

Canadian-American philosopher (born 1933)

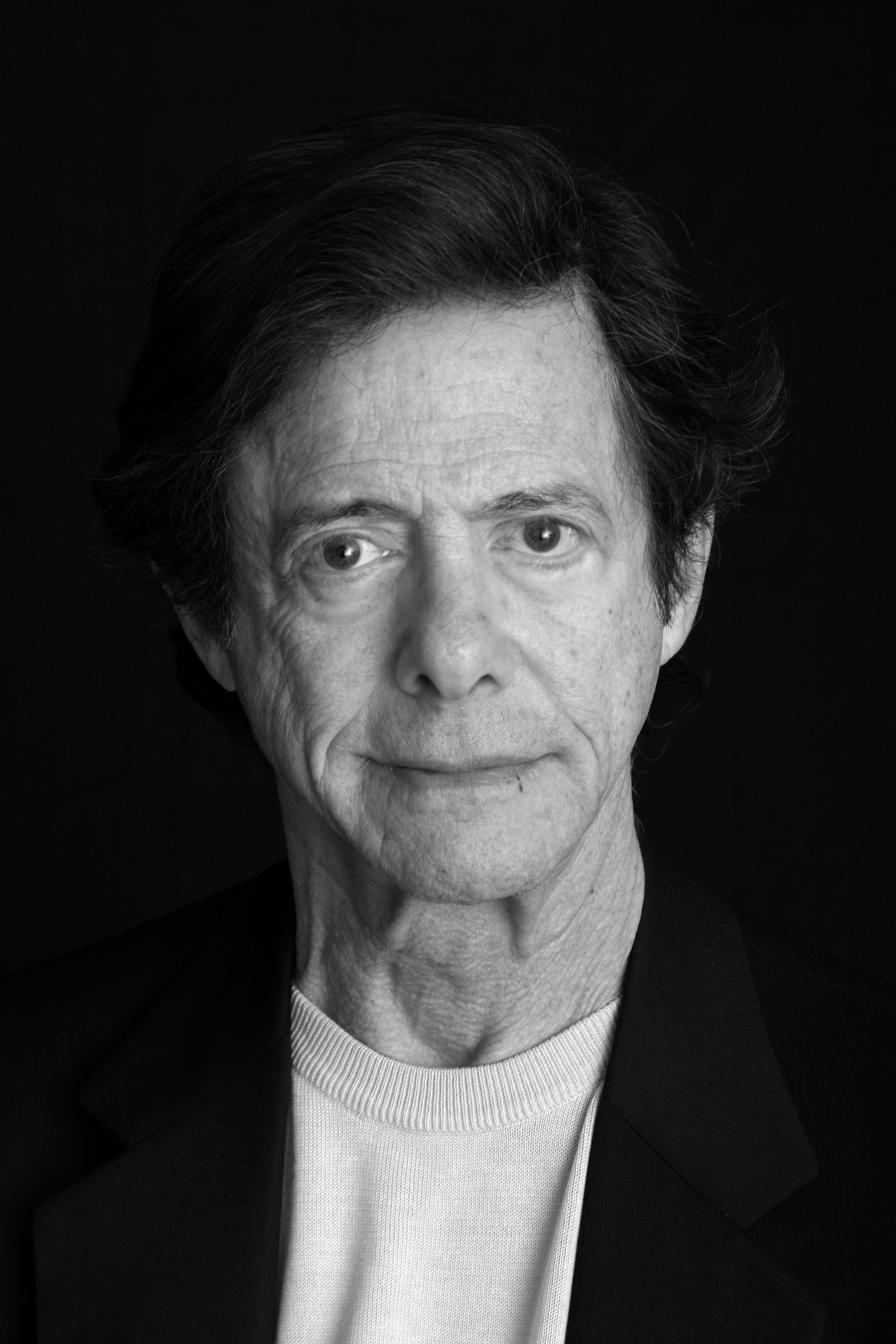
- Peikoff in 2010
- Born: October 15, 1933 (age 93); Winnipeg, Manitoba, Canada
- Spouses: Susan Ludel (m. 1971; div. 1978) Cynthia Pastor (m. 1983, divorced) Amy Lynn Rambach (div. 2012) Grace Davis (m. 2023)

Education
- Education: University of Manitoba; New York University (BA, MA, PhD)

Philosophical work
- Era: Contemporary philosophy
- Region: Western philosophy
- School: Objectivism
- Main interests: Epistemology, ethics, applied ethics, theory of history
- Notable works: Objectivism: The Philosophy of Ayn Rand
- Website: Peikoff.com

Leonard Sylvan Peikoff (/ˈpiːkɒf/ PEE-kof; born October 15, 1933) is a Canadian American philosopher. He is an Objectivist and was a close associate of Ayn Rand, who designated him heir to her estate. Peikoff is a former professor of philosophy and host of a nationally syndicated radio talk show. He co-founded the Ayn Rand Institute (ARI) in 1985 and is the author of several books on philosophy.

== Early life and career ==
Leonard Peikoff was born on October 15, 1933, in Winnipeg, Manitoba, Canada, to Samuel Peikoff, MD, a surgeon, and his wife Bessie, a band leader. He is of Russian-Jewish descent. He attended the University of Manitoba from 1950 to 1953 as a pre-med student. However, following his early discussions with Rand, he transferred to New York University to study philosophy, where he received his BA, MA, and PhD degrees in philosophy in 1954, 1957, and 1964, respectively. His doctoral dissertation adviser was the noted American pragmatist philosopher Sidney Hook, and his dissertation dealt with the metaphysical status of the law of noncontradiction. He taught philosophy for many years at various colleges.

== Early involvement in Objectivism ==
Peikoff first met Ayn Rand through his cousin Barbara Branden (then Barbara Weidman) in California when he was 17. He reports that this meeting with Rand made him aware of the profound importance of philosophy. When Rand moved to New York City in 1951, Peikoff decided to study philosophy at New York University. While studying at NYU, he frequently discussed philosophy privately with Rand in depth across a range of issues.

Peikoff, along with Nathaniel Branden, Alan Greenspan, Barbara Branden, and a number of other close associates, who jokingly called themselves "The Collective", met frequently with Rand to discuss philosophy and politics, as well as to read and discuss Rand's then-forthcoming novel, Atlas Shrugged, in her Manhattan apartment. In 1958, Branden founded the Nathaniel Branden Lectures, later renamed the Nathaniel Branden Institute (NBI), to promote Objectivism through lectures and educational seminars around the United States. Peikoff was among NBI's first lecturers, teaching a course on the history of philosophy. By the early 1960s, NBI had representatives in multiple cities who replayed taped versions of the lectures to local audiences.

Discussions with Peikoff and Allan Gotthelf in the 1960s motivated Rand to complete an extended monograph on concept-formation, Introduction to Objectivist Epistemology. Rand included Peikoff's essay critiquing the analytic–synthetic dichotomy when it was published in book form in 1979. Peikoff was also an active participant in Rand's 1969–1971 workshops on the monograph, as well as subsequent, smaller philosophy workshops at Rand's apartment. Peikoff later used the transcripts of these workshops to create an expanded edition of Introduction to Objectivist Epistemology, which he co-edited with Harry Binswanger.

Following the dissolution of NBI in 1968, Peikoff continued to give private lecture courses on a variety of topics to large Objectivist audiences, and recordings of these have been sold for many years. His lecture courses include: The History of Philosophy (in two "volumes" of lectures), An Introduction to Logic, The Art of Thinking, Induction in Physics and Philosophy, Moral Virtue, A Philosophy of Education, Understanding Objectivism, The Principles of Objective Communication, and Eight Great Plays. Rand endorsed his 1976 lecture series on Objectivism as the best exposition of her philosophy, the only one she knew to be accurate.

Peikoff's first book, The Ominous Parallels, was both an Objectivist explanation of the rise of the Third Reich and The Holocaust, and a warning that America was being led down the road to totalitarianism because of far-reaching philosophical and cultural parallels between the Weimar Republic and the present-day United States. In her introduction, Rand said it was the first book by an Objectivist philosopher other than herself.

== After Rand's death ==
Rand named Peikoff the legal heir to her estate. As the executor of Rand's will, Peikoff handles the copyrights to all of her works, with the exception of Anthem, which has passed into the public domain. He has supervised the editing and release of Rand's unpublished works in several volumes, which includes her letters, philosophical journals, and the fiction not published in her lifetime; he has also written forewords for all the current printings of her fiction. For several years, he continued Rand's tradition of lecturing annually at Boston's Ford Hall Forum, and his other lecture appearances have included an address to the cadets at West Point and another while cruising the Greek islands.

In 1985, Peikoff founded the Ayn Rand Institute. Peikoff revised his 1976 lecture course on Rand's ideas into book form as Objectivism: The Philosophy of Ayn Rand, published in 1991, the first comprehensive presentation of Objectivism. In the mid-1990s, Peikoff taught courses at the Ayn Rand Institute's Objectivist Graduate Center (which was renamed the Objectivist Academic Center in 2000), along with Harry Binswanger and Peter Schwartz.

From 1995 through 1999, Peikoff hosted a nationally syndicated talk-radio show focusing on philosophy and culture. From February 2006 to June 2007, Peikoff posted an online Q&A featuring questions that had been e-mailed to him. This was replaced with a podcast that debuted on October 22, 2007, and continued until October 31, 2016.

Peikoff's lectures or books have been used extensively in the works of Allan Gotthelf, Harry Binswanger, Andrew Bernstein, and Tara Smith, writers who are associated with the Ayn Rand Institute, and also in works such as David Kelley's The Evidence of the Senses, George H. Smith's Atheism: The Case Against God, and the treatise, What Art Is: the Esthetic Theory of Ayn Rand by Louis Torres and Michelle Marder Kahmi, despite these authors' other differences with him.

Peikoff's 1983 lecture course Understanding Objectivism was edited into a book of the same title by Michael Berliner, editor of the Letters of Ayn Rand, and Peikoff's theory of logical induction, first presented in the lecture courses Induction in Physics and Philosophy and Objectivism Through Induction, has been developed further by David Harriman in his book, The Logical Leap: Induction in Physics. In his 2012 book The DIM Hypothesis, Peikoff defines the three approaches to cognitive integration—disintegration, integration, and misintegration—and applies the hypothesis to physics, philosophy, education, politics, and other fields.

His articles have appeared in publications as diverse as Barron's and The New Scholasticism, and his television appearances have ranged from Bill Maher's Politically Incorrect and Bill O'Reilly's The O'Reilly Factor to C-SPAN panel discussions. He also appears in Ayn Rand: A Sense of Life, the Academy Award-nominated documentary by Michael Paxton.

=== Split with David Kelley ===
Peikoff views Objectivism as a "closed system" that consists solely of the philosophical principles Rand herself had articulated, and he considers disagreement with any of these principles a departure from Objectivism. The Ayn Rand Institute promotes Peikoff's view of Objectivism.

The closed vs. open issue came to the fore when David Kelley, a philosopher then affiliated with Peikoff and ARI, published his essay "A Question of Sanction", arguing for greater open-mindedness in working with other groups. Kelley sees Objectivism as an "open system" that can evolve beyond Rand's own writings and beliefs. Peikoff presented his objections to Kelley in an article called "Fact and Value," arguing that Kelley's case itself contradicted Rand's understanding of the relationship between cognition and evaluation, facts, and moral values. Peikoff concluded that Kelley was not a genuine Objectivist and urged anyone agreeing with Kelley to leave the Objectivist movement. Ultimately, Kelley responded by founding the Institute for Objectivist Studies in 1990, which later changed its name to The Objectivist Center and finally The Atlas Society.

=== Library of Congress dispute ===
Peikoff inherited many of Rand's manuscripts. During her lifetime, Rand had made a statement that she would bequeath her manuscripts to the Library of Congress. She later had reservations, and the bequest was not part of Rand's will. However, after her death, the Library of Congress requested the manuscripts. In July 1991, Peikoff had an assistant deliver the manuscripts of Rand's novels, except for the first and last pages of The Fountainhead, which he had framed. In their stead, he had the pages photocopied so that the manuscripts would be "complete". On August 16, 1998, the Los Angeles Times published an article about Peikoff, including a joke he made about "stealing" the pages from the Library of Congress. The library demanded that he deliver the pages to them, deeming them to be U. S. government property. A complaint from the United States Department of Justice followed in October 2000, claiming over a million dollars in damages unless Peikoff turned over the pages. After consulting his lawyer, Peikoff released the pages to a representative of the Library of Congress.

== Thought ==
=== Epistemology ===
In his book The Logical Leap: Induction in Physics (which he co-wrote with physicist David Harriman), Peikoff argues that there is no problem of induction, because philosophy is itself an inductive science and, therefore, that any attempt to deny the validity of induction contradicts itself by implicitly accepting the validity of induction. Peikoff and Harriman also argue that scientific claims verified by induction should be considered true until new evidence warrants modifying or amending them because scientific knowledge derived from induction is contextual. In other words, those who on the basis of conclusive evidence make inductive scientific claims regarding science cannot argue that their claims are subject to no possible modification but can argue that they are the only rational claims that can be believed based on the available evidence. They conclude that the same process of induction is essential to every rational field (except mathematics) and that, as a result, truth in any such field possesses the same objectivity as that of physics.

=== Politics ===
Peikoff supports laissez-faire capitalism, arguing that the role of government in society should be limited to night-watchman state conceptions of protecting individuals from the initiation of force and fraud. He opposes taxation, public education, welfare, and business regulations. He also opposes laws regulating pornography, euthanasia, or stem cell research. He is a supporter of abortion rights. However, Peikoff criticizes defenders of abortion who label themselves "pro-choice", arguing that the term ignores the deeper philosophical issues involved. He believes that circumcision of a child too young to consent should be a crime and is evil.

He also continues Rand's opposition to libertarianism, remaining sharply opposed to any description of Objectivist political philosophy as "libertarian" and to any collaboration with most libertarian groups. He has been critical of American foreign policy, considering both neoconservative and libertarian views self-sacrificial. He objects to the terms "isolationist" or "interventionist" to describe his foreign policy views, stating that the only "intervention" the United States should enact is war and "only and when it is in self-defense."

==== Elián González ====
Peikoff campaigned for Elián González to remain in Florida, rather than returning to his father in Cuba, stating, "To send a child to rot in the prison of Cuba for the alleged sake of his own well-being is criminal hypocrisy. To send him there in order to preserve his father's rights is absurdity, since there are no parental or other rights in Cuba. To send him there because 'He needs a father, no matter what' is a mindless bromide. Does he need a father who has no choice but to watch his son being broken in mind and starved in body?"

==== Palestinians and Israel ====
Peikoff claims that Palestinian people prior to the establishment of the State of Israel consisted solely of "nomadic tribes meandering across the terrain," and that "the Arabs" today have no concept of property rights; indeed, that their "primitivist" antagonism to such rights is the root cause of Arab terrorism. He argues that Israel is a moral beacon which should not return any territory to Arabs or even negotiate with them.

==== Iran and nuclear weapons ====
Peikoff considers the nationalization of Middle Eastern oil properties developed by Western corporations—beginning with Iran in 1951—to be in violation of international law and refers to such efforts as "confiscation" and supports covert actions to reverse such efforts. He advocates bringing an end to what he claims are "terrorist states" and has routinely lobbied for regime change in Iran "as quickly as possible and with the fewest U.S. casualties, regardless of the countless innocents caught in the line of fire," not ruling out the use of nuclear weapons, arguing that moral responsibility for innocent deaths would lie with their governments rather than the United States.

==== Presidential endorsements ====
In April 1992, Peikoff endorsed "any Democrat nominated by his party for the Presidency", citing President George H. W. Bush's "truly disgraceful" record, specifically tax hikes, support for new employee protections, his foreign trade policy, foreign aid to Russia, alleged hostility to Israel, the Gulf War, anti-abortion and anti-obscenity views, and alleged failure to defend Salman Rushdie's freedom of speech during the Satanic Verses controversy.

In 2004, Peikoff endorsed John Kerry (despite thinking of Kerry as a "disgustingly bad" candidate) against George W. Bush (whom he called "apocalyptically bad"), on the basis of Bush's religiosity and his refusal to crush Islamic regimes, especially Iran, along with his "doomed" economic policies. In advance of the 2006 elections, Peikoff recommended voting only for Democrats, to forestall what he saw as a rise in influence of the religious right, adding:

Given the choice between a rotten, enfeebled, despairing killer [Democrats], and a rotten, ever stronger, and ambitious killer [Republicans], it is immoral to vote for the latter, and equally immoral to refrain from voting at all because "both are bad."

Of the 2008 United States presidential election, Peikoff said, "I wouldn't dream of voting", saying that the Republicans should be "wiped out" or "severely punished" for their association with the religious right. Furthermore, he characterized Barack Obama as "anti-American" and a "lying phoney" with troubling connections to both Islam and Reverend Jeremiah Wright. He labelled Obama's running mate Joe Biden an "enjoyably hilarious windbag", and their Republican opponents John McCain and Sarah Palin as a "tired moron" and an "opportunist", respectively.

In a 2010 podcast, Peikoff explained why he supports immigration restrictions in the current context of the welfare state, and why he does not see this as a contradiction to Objectivism's general rejection of immigration restrictions. In another 2010 podcast, Peikoff explained that he does not support the building of a mosque near Ground Zero in New York City, arguing that property rights are always contextual and that preventing the construction is a wartime necessity. Similarly, he supported the French ban on the burqa.

In September 2012, Peikoff endorsed Mitt Romney for the Presidency, citing President Obama's alleged nihilism, taxation, economic and energy policies, Obamacare and his use of executive orders. However, Peikoff was not enthusiastic in his endorsement of Romney, calling him an "appeasing, directionless" candidate with "no political convictions" who would be useful for buying time. For the same reason, he endorsed the Republican Congressional nominees. Afterwards, he called Obama's re-election a "catastrophe", "the worst political event ever to occur in the history of this continent" and "worse than the Civil War".

In the 2020 and 2024 elections, Peikoff supported Donald Trump.

== Personal life ==
Peikoff has been married four times and divorced three. In September 1971, he married Susan Ludel; they divorced in 1978. He married his second wife, Cynthia Pastor, in February 1983. Their daughter Kira Peikoff was born in 1985; Leonard and Cynthia divorced when Kira was six. He subsequently married Amy Lynn Rambach; they divorced in 2012. In September 2023, he married Grace Davis.

== Books ==
- The Ominous Parallels (1982) ISBN 0-452-01117-5
- The Early Ayn Rand (edit. and introductory essays by Peikoff) (1984) ISBN 0-453-00465-2
- The Voice of Reason: Essays in Objectivist Thought (edit. and additional essays by Peikoff) (1989) ISBN 0-453-00634-5
- Introduction to Objectivist Epistemology (expanded second edition) (with Harry Binswanger, PhD, editor) (1990) ISBN 0-453-00724-4
- Objectivism: The Philosophy of Ayn Rand (1991) ISBN 0-452-01101-9
- The Ayn Rand Reader (with Gary Hull, PhD, editor) (1999) ISBN 0-452-28040-0
- Understanding Objectivism: A Guide to Learning Ayn Rand's Philosophy (Michael Berliner, PhD, editor) (2012) ISBN 0-451-23629-7
- The DIM Hypothesis: Why the Lights of the West Are Going Out (2012) ISBN 0-451-46664-0
- Objective Communication: Writing, Speaking and Arguing (2013) ISBN 0-451-41815-8
- Teaching Johnny to Think: A Philosophy of Education Based on the Principles of Ayn Rand's Objectivism (2014) ISBN 0-9794661-6-4
- The Cause of Hitler's Germany (2014) ISBN 0-14-218147-1
- Discovering Great Plays: As Literature and as Philosophy (2017) ISBN 978-0-9794661-9-9

== See also ==
- American philosophy
- Ethical egoism
- Free market
- Objectivism and libertarianism
- List of American philosophers
- Ontology
- Philosophical realism
- Philosophy of history
- Rational egoism
