= Introduction to Objectivist Epistemology =

1979 book by Ayn Rand

- Cover of the 1979 New American Library edition
- Author: Ayn Rand
- Language: English
- Subject: Epistemology
- Publisher: New American Library (1st edition); Meridian (2nd edition)
- Publication date: 1979 (1st edition); 1990 (2nd edition)
- Publication place: United States
- Media type: Print (Hardcover and Paperback)
- Pages: 164 (1st edition); 314 (2nd edition)
- ISBN: 0-451-61751-7 (1st edition); ISBN 0-452-01030-6 (2nd edition)
- OCLC: 20353709

Introduction to Objectivist Epistemology is a book about epistemology by the philosopher Ayn Rand (with an additional article by Leonard Peikoff). Rand considered it her most important philosophical writing. First published in installments in Rand's journal, The Objectivist, July 1966 through February 1967, the work presents Rand's proposed solution to the historic problem of universals, describes how the theory can be extended to complex cases, and outlines how it applies to other issues in the theory of knowledge.

== Summary ==
Rand bases her solution to the problem of universals on a quasi-mathematical analysis of similarity. Rejecting the common view that similarity is unanalyzable, she defines similarity as: "the relationship between two or more existents which possess the same characteristic(s), but in different measure or degree."

The grasp of similarity, she holds, requires a contrast between the two or more similar items and a third item that differs from them, but differs along the same scale of measurement (which she termed a "Conceptual Common Denominator"). Thus two shades of blue, to be perceived as similar, must be contrasted with something differing greatly in hue from both—e.g., a shade of red.

Accordingly, Rand defines "concept" as: a "mental integration of two or more units possessing the same distinguishing characteristic(s) with their particular measurements omitted."

The monograph includes chapters outlining the Objectivist theory of how higher-order concepts are formed ("Abstraction from Abstraction"), how measurement applies to phenomena of consciousness, the nature and cognitive significance of definitions (including a defense of essence as being "epistemological" not "metaphysical"), a theory of axiomatic concepts, not axiomatic propositions, as being the base of conceptual cognition, the introduction of a "principle of unit economy" as crucial for judging and justifying and conceptual-level content, and a call for the wholesale rejection of the Kantian turn in philosophy, seeing Kant as falsely opposing the identity of consciousness to its cognitive validity—i.e., to its being conscious.

"...the attack on man's consciousness and particularly on his conceptual faculty has rested on the unchallenged premise that any knowledge acquired by a process of consciousness is necessarily subjective and cannot correspond to the facts of reality, since it is 'processed knowledge.'"

"All knowledge is processed knowledge--whether on the sensory, perceptual or conceptual level. An "unprocessed" knowledge would be a knowledge acquired without means of cognition. Consciousness (as I said in the first sentence of this work) is not a passive state, but an active process."

An additional essay by Peikoff, based on Rand's theory and edited by her, criticizes the analytic–synthetic distinction, arguing that it stems from a wrong theory of what is included in the meaning of a concept. A concept, Rand and Peikoff maintain, includes all the characteristics possessed by the referents, not just the defining characteristics.

The 1990 edition of Introduction to Objectivist Epistemology includes 200 pages of discussion between Rand and philosophy professionals, culled from tape recordings of the five "Workshops in Objectivist Epistemology" that Rand conducted in late 1969 through early 1970. The most active among those questioning Rand on the meaning and implication of her theory were John O. Nelson, George Walsh, Leonard Peikoff, Allan Gotthelf, and Harry Binswanger. About a dozen others participated to a lesser degree.

== Publication history ==
Rand's title essay was originally serialized in The Objectivist from July 1966 to February 1967, then reprinted by the Nathaniel Branden Institute later in 1967 as a booklet. Peikoff's essay was first published in The Objectivist in its May 1967 to September 1967 issues. The combined book was published by New American Library in 1979. The same publisher also put out the revised edition, co-edited by Peikoff and Harry Binswanger, in 1990.

== Reception ==
Both the original and revised editions of the book received relatively little attention from reviewers, although there was a review in the journal Teaching Philosophy. The work has received extensive, in-depth exposition and development in: A Companion to Ayn Rand (Blackwell Companions to Philosophy) Wiley-Blackwell: 2016, Gotthelf and Salmieri (ed.), Concepts and Their Role in Knowledge: Reflections on Objectivist Epistemology (Ayn Rand Society Philosophical Studies), and How We Know: Epistemology on an Objectivist Foundation (Binswanger, TOF Publications: 2014).
