= Ayn Rand Institute =

American-based non-profit organization

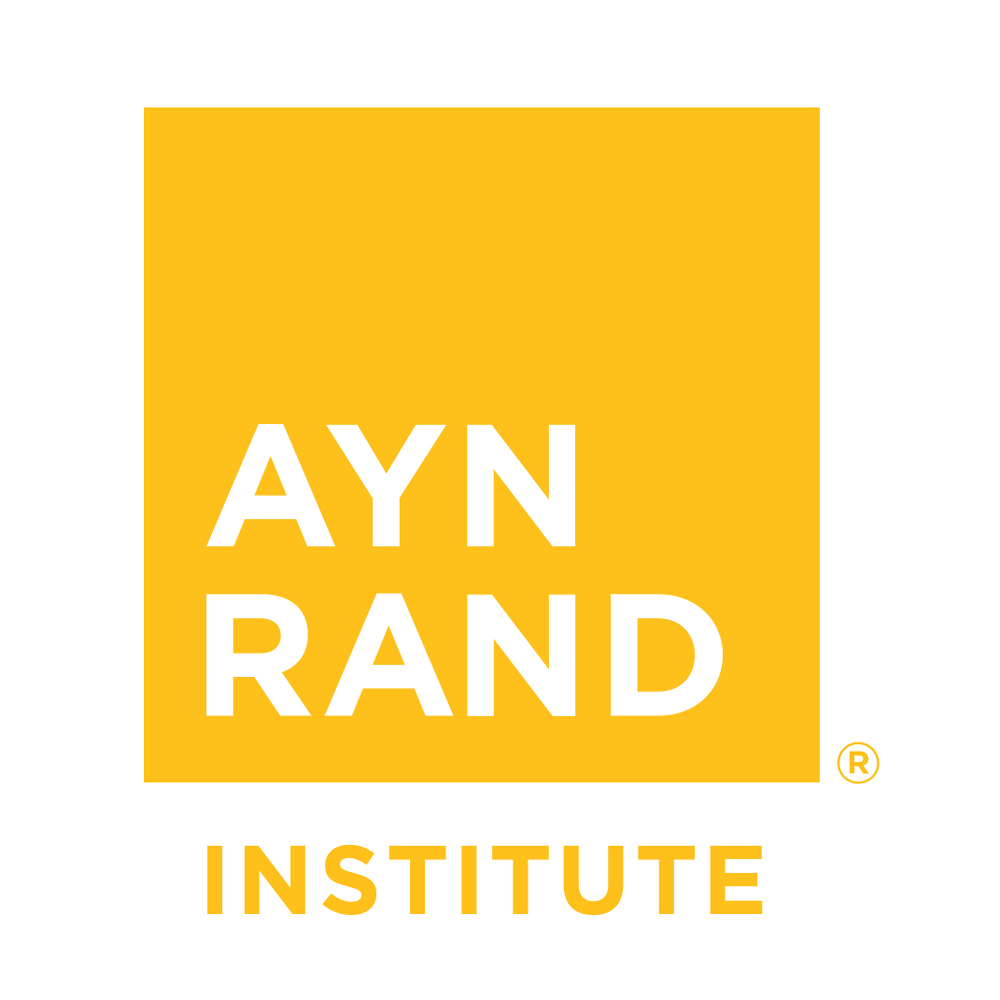
- Formation: 1985; 41 years ago
- Type: Research and education organization
- Tax ID no.: 22-2570926
- Legal status: 501(c)(3) public charity
- Purpose: promote ideas related to Ayn Rand's philosophy
- Headquarters: Santa Ana, California, U.S.
- Coordinates: 33.6964°N 117.8663°W
- CEO: Tal Tsfany
- Website: ari.aynrand.org

The Ayn Rand Institute: The Center for the Advancement of Objectivism, commonly known as the Ayn Rand Institute (ARI), is a 501(c)(3) nonprofit think tank in Santa Ana, California, that promotes Objectivism, the philosophy developed by Ayn Rand. The organization was established in 1985, three years after Rand's death, by businessman Ed Snider and Leonard Peikoff, Rand's legal heir.

Ideas promoted by the Ayn Rand Institute include atheism, capitalism, and individual rights. The ARI has supported the American Tea Party movement. Initially, the ARI also supported the United States' wars against Afghanistan and Iraq; it later criticized the execution of these wars.

The institute's stated goal is to "create a culture whose guiding principles are reason, rational self-interest, individualism and laissez-faire capitalism". ARI has several educational and outreach programs, which include providing intellectuals for public appearances, supporting Objectivist campus clubs, supplying Rand's writings to schools and professors, assisting overseas Objectivist institutions, organizing annual conferences, and running the Objectivist Academic Center.

== History ==
Peikoff, her legal heir, was convinced to found the Ayn Rand Institute after businessman Ed Snider organized a meeting of possible financial supporters in New York in the fall of 1983. Peikoff then agreed to be the first chairman of the organization's board of directors.

In 1983, a group of Objectivists, including George Reisman, organized the Jefferson School of Philosophy, Economics and Politics. The Jefferson School held a two-week-long conference at the University of California, San Diego later that year, a conference which continued to occur every two years and is the predecessor of ARI's current annual Objectivist Conference.

ARI began operations on February 1, 1985, three years after Rand's death, in Marina del Rey, California. The first board of directors included Snider and psychologist Edith Packer. Snider was also one of the founding donors for the organization along with educational entrepreneur Carl Barney. Its first executive director was Michael Berliner, who was previously the chairman of the Department of Social and Philosophical Foundations of Education at California State University, Northridge. ARI also established a board of governors, which initially included Harry Binswanger, Robert Hessen, Edwin Locke, Arthur Mode, George Reisman, Jay Snider, and Mary Ann Sures, with Peter Schwartz as its chairman. M. Northrup Buechner and George Walsh joined the board of advisors shortly thereafter.

ARI's first two projects were aimed at students. One was developing a network of college clubs to study Objectivism. The other was a college scholarship contest for high-school students based on writing an essay about Rand's novel The Fountainhead. Later, additional essay contests were added based on other Ayn Rand works such as Anthem. In 1988, ARI began publishing Impact, a newsletter for contributors.

In 1989, a philosophical dispute resulted in ARI ending its association with philosopher David Kelley. Some members of the board of advisors agreed with Kelley and also left, including George Walsh. Kelley subsequently founded his own competing institute now known as The Atlas Society, which remains critical of ARI's stance on strict loyalty to Rand's principles.

In 1994, ARI launched the Objectivist Graduate Center, which offered both distance-learning and in-person courses.

In January 2000, Berliner retired as executive director, replaced by Yaron Brook, then an assistant professor of finance at Santa Clara University. Onkar Ghate began working for ARI later that year and ARI launched the Objectivist Academic Center.

In 2002, ARI moved from Marina del Rey to larger offices in Irvine, California. In 2003, ARI launched the Anthem Fellowship for the Study of Objectivism, a fellowship that financially supports universities who have Objectivist professors.

Charity Navigator, which rates charitable and educational organizations to inform potential donors, gives ARI two out of four stars in 2020. As of September 2021, ARI's board of directors consists of Brook; Tsfany; Harry Binswanger, philosopher and long-time associate of Rand; Tara Smith, professor of philosophy at the University of Texas at Austin; and John Allison, board member and former CEO of the Cato Institute and former CEO of BB&T; Larry Salzman of the Pacific Legal Foundation; Tim Blum, a Chicago real-estate developer; Robert Mayhew, professor of philosophy at Seton Hall University; Jim Brown, CFA; Onkar Ghate, Chief Philosophy Officer of the institute.

Peikoff retains a cooperative and influential relationship with ARI. In 2006, he remarked that he approved of the work ARI has done and in November 2010 that the executive director "has done a splendid job". Peikoff was a featured speaker at the 2007 and 2010 Objectivist Conferences. In August 2010, he demanded a change to ARI's board of directors, resulting in the resignation of John McCaskey.

A central goal for ARI throughout the 2010s was to spread Objectivism globally. ARI helped establish the Ayn Rand Center Israel in 2012, the Ayn Rand Institute Europe in 2015 and the Ayn Rand Center Japan in 2017. Each of these organizations are separate legal entities from the United States-based ARI, but they are all affiliated with ARI.

In January 2017, ARI announced Jim Brown as its CEO, succeeding Yaron Brook as its operational executive. In June 2018, Tal Tsfany, co-founder of the Ayn Rand Center Israel, took over as the president and CEO of ARI.

In 2020, during the COVID-19 pandemic, ARI received a Paycheck Protection Program loan of between $350,000 and $1 million. Binswanger and Ghate described the decision as "partial restitution for government-inflicted losses". The decision was criticized from commentators who argued the decision was inconsistent with the organization's opposition to government spending programs.

== Ideas promoted ==
ARI promotes Objectivism, the philosophy developed by Ayn Rand. ARI sponsors writers and speakers who apply Objectivism to contemporary issues, including philosophy, politics and art.

ARI has argued against displaying religious symbols such as the Ten Commandments in government facilities and against faith-based initiatives. ARI intellectuals argue that religion is incompatible with American ideals and opposes the teaching of "intelligent design" in public schools.

ARI is strongly supportive of free speech and opposes all forms of censorship, including laws that ban obscenity and hate speech. In response to the Muhammad cartoons controversy, ARI started a Free Speech Campaign in 2006. Steve Simpson, formerly director of legal studies at ARI, has argued that campaign finance is a free speech issue and that laws that limit it are a violation of the First Amendment. Accordingly, Simpson and ARI strongly support Citizens United.

ARI holds that the motivation for Islamic terrorism comes from their religiosity, not poverty or a reaction to Western policies. They have urged that the United States use overwhelming, retaliatory force to "end states who sponsor terrorism", using whatever means are necessary to end the threat. In his article "End States Who Sponsor Terrorism", which was published as a full page ad in The New York Times, Peikoff wrote: "The choice today is mass death in the United States or mass death in the terrorist nations. Our Commander-In-Chief must decide whether it is his duty to save Americans or the governments who conspire to kill them." Although some at ARI initially supported the invasion of Iraq, it has criticized how the Iraq War was handled. Since 2001, ARI has held that Iran should be the primary target in the war against "Islamic totalitarianism".

ARI is generally supportive of Israel. Of Zionism, Yaron Brook writes: "Zionism fused a valid concern – self-preservation amid a storm of hostility – with a toxic premise – ethnically based collectivism and religion." ARI opposes environmentalism and animal rights, arguing that they are destructive to human well-being. ARI is also highly critical of diversity and affirmative action programs as well as multiculturalism, arguing that they are based on racist premises that ignore the commonality of a shared humanity. ARI supports women's right to choose abortion, voluntary euthanasia and assisted suicide.

ARI denounces neoconservatism in general. For example, C. Bradley Thompson wrote an article entitled "The Decline and Fall of American Conservatism", which was later turned with Yaron Brook into a book called Neoconservatism: An Obituary for an Idea.

The Jewish Chronicle and The Jerusalem Post described ARI as a right-wing organization.

== Programs and activism ==
ARI runs a variety of programs, many of which are aimed at students. It sends free books to schools, sponsors student essay contests and campus clubs, and offers financial assistance to students applying to graduate school. It also has an online bookstore, offers internships for current and recently graduated college students and provides speakers for public lectures and media appearances.

In October 2012, ARI helped establish the Ayn Rand Center Israel (ARCI) to promote Objectivism in Israel and the Middle East. Its current director is Boaz Arad. In 2016, ARCI launched the Atlas Award for the Best Israeli Start-up, presented annually at the Tel Aviv Stock Exchange. Judges for the award include Yaron Brook and Shlomo Kalish. Moovit was the first recipient of the award in 2016 and Zebra Medical Vision won the award in 2017.

In April 2015, ARI helped establish the Ayn Rand Institute Europe to promote Objectivism in Europe. The current chairman of ARI Europe is Lars Seir Christensen, CEO and co-founder of Saxo Bank. In February 2017, ARI helped establish the Ayn Rand Center Japan. ARI has also helped guide the independent Spain-based Objetivismo Internacional, which seeks to spread Objectivism in the Spanish-speaking world.

=== The Atlas Award ===
The Ayn Rand Institute's Atlas Award is described by the organization as intended to encourage entrepreneurship. According to the institute, it is awarded to an entrepreneur who uses wealth creation, business activity, and technological advancements to improve quality of life. In 2016, CEO of Moovit Nir Erez received the award and sought to distance himself from the political associations of the institute and the award stating, "We are purely trying to focus on transportation and moving, not on political issues. On the contrary, we would like to be as apolitical as possible." Some of the previous company candidates for the award have been Outbrain, Kaminario, SimiliarWeb, Valens, Zerto, Gigya, Ctera Networks, and Forter.

== See also ==
- Charles Koch Institute
