= Harry Binswanger =

American philosopher (born 1944)

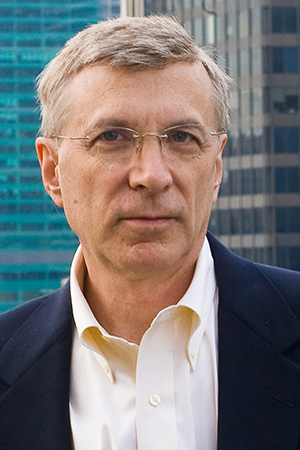
- Born: 1944 (age 81–82); Richmond, Virginia

Education
- Education: Massachusetts Institute of Technology (BS); Columbia University (PhD)
- Thesis: The Biological Basis of Teleological Concepts

Philosophical work
- Era: Contemporary philosophy
- Region: Western philosophy
- School: Objectivism
- Institutions: Ayn Rand Institute
- Notable works: How We Know: Epistemology on an Objectivist Foundation

Harry Binswanger (/ˈbɪnzwæŋər/; born 1944) is an American professor and author. He is an Objectivist and a former board member of the Ayn Rand Institute. He was an associate of Ayn Rand, working with her on The Ayn Rand Lexicon. Binswanger is the author of How We Know: Epistemology on an Objectivist Foundation (2014). His most recent book is Ayn Rand's Philosophic Achievement (2024). His blog and (fee-based) membership site is HBLetter.com.

== Biography ==
Harry Binswanger was born and raised in Richmond, Virginia. His father, Sam Binswanger, was president of the family business, Binswanger Glass Company, founded in 1872.

In 1961, Binswanger entered the Massachusetts Institute of Technology, having had a keen interest in science in general since early childhood, and later in theoretical physics in particular.

But after becoming aware of and then studying Ayn Rand's philosophy, Objectivism, he chose philosophy as his major and neuroscience as his minor. In 1965 he received a Bachelor of Science in Humanities and Engineering (XXI-B).

As an undergraduate, Binswanger argued for Objectivism in philosophy courses taught by some of the field's leading figures, including Philippa Foot, Hubert Dreyfus, and Hilary Putnam. During his senior year, he helped start a campus Objectivist group, the M.I.T. Radicals for Capitalism. Further, Binswanger also published a mimeographed periodical on Objectivism, initially named The Atlantis Review.

In June 1965, Binswanger came to New York City to pursue a doctorate in philosophy at Columbia University and to be in the city that was then the center of Objectivism, where Ayn Rand and her associates gave frequent lectures. Through the 1960s and 1970s, he got to know Ayn Rand. In Rand's final years, they became good friends. Binswanger and Rand met once or twice a week to discuss ideas and play Scrabble.

Binswanger's own philosophical work is solidly in the tradition of Rand's philosophy. From 1980 through 1987, he published and edited a bimonthly journal called The Objectivist Forum, which was later published as a hardback collection. Binswanger edited the new material in the second edition of Rand's book, Introduction to Objectivist Epistemology, published in 1990 after her death. (Note: The first edition was published in 1979.) He also conceived and created The Ayn Rand Lexicon, a compilation of Rand's views on some 400 topics in philosophy and cognate fields. His book, How We Know: Epistemology on an Objectivist Foundation, was published in 2014.

Binswanger was on the board of directors of the Ayn Rand Institute for 36 years. He also moderates and posts to a fee-based online discussion group on Objectivism, called "The Harry Binswanger Letter", which he has operated since 1998. Binswanger was previously a contributor to Forbes and RealClearMarkets. His television appearances have included Glenn Beck and Geraldo at Large. He also appears in Ayn Rand: A Sense of Life, the Academy Award-nominated documentary by Michael Paxton, and Ayn Rand & the Prophecy of Atlas Shrugged, a 2011 documentary by Chris Mortensen.

== Views ==
Binswanger has been described as an "orthodox" Objectivist who is committed to ideas of his mentor Rand, whom he considers a "once in a millennium genius". Binswanger expressed support for Israel on Glenn Beck and denied global warming in his Forbes column of April 3, 2013. He calls for "absolutely open immigration" in a post on his website.

In 1986, Binswanger and John Ridpath participated in a debate on Socialism vs Capitalism against John Judis and Christopher Hitchens. In this debate he argued for the merits of capitalism as compared to socialism from an Objectivist perspective. During the debate, Binswanger stated "Colonialism is the best thing that ever happened to the colonies," and "We view the colonialization of India and the rest of the world [...] as the extending of wealth and civilization to backward regions."

== Works ==
=== As author ===
- Binswanger, Harry (2024). Ayn Rand's Philosophic Achievement and Other Essays by Harry Binswanger. Los Angeles: Ayn Rand Institute Press. ISBN 978-0985640637
- Binswanger, Harry (2014). How We Know: Epistemology on an Objectivist Foundation. New York: TOF Publications. ISBN 978-0985640637
- Binswanger, Harry (1990). The Biological Basis of Teleological Concepts. Los Angeles: Ayn Rand Institute Press. ISBN 0-9625336-0-2.
- Binswanger, Harry (2005). "'Free Competition' at Gunpoint". In Hull, Gary (ed.). The Abolition of Antitrust. Transaction Publishers. ISBN 0-7658-0282-1.
- Binswanger, Harry (2011). "The Dollar and the Gun". In Ralston, Richard E. (ed.). Why Businessmen Need Philosophy. Irvine, CA: Ayn Rand Institute Press. ISBN 978-0-9625336-2-4.
- Binswanger, Harry (2011). "Philosophy: The Ultimate CEO". In Ralston, Richard E. (ed.). Why Businessmen Need Philosophy. Irvine, CA: Ayn Rand Institute Press. ISBN 978-0-9625336-2-4.
- Binswanger, Harry (2014). How We Know: Epistemology on an Objectivist Foundation. New York: TOF Publications. ISBN 978-0-9856406-1-3.

=== As editor ===
- The Objectivist Forum. Vols 1–8, 1980–1987. LCCN 83-640866
- Rand, Ayn (1986). The Ayn Rand Lexicon: Objectivism from A to Z. New York: New American Library. ISBN 0-453-00528-4.
- Rand, Ayn (1990). Introduction to Objectivist Epistemology. Co-edited with Leonard Peikoff (2nd ed.). New York: Meridian. ISBN 0-453-00724-4.
