= Andrew Bernstein (philosopher) =

American philosopher

Education
- Education: City University of New York (PhD)

Philosophical work
- School: Objectivism
- Website: AndrewBernstein.net

Andrew Bernstein is an American philosopher. He is a proponent of Objectivism, the philosophy of Ayn Rand. He is also the author of several books, both fiction and non-fiction.

== Education and career ==
Bernstein is the author of The Capitalist Manifesto: The Historic, Economic, and Philosophic Case for Laissez-Faire, Capitalism Unbound: The Incontestable Case for Individual Rights and Objectivism in One Lesson; he also wrote two novels, Heart of a Pagan and A Dearth of Eagles. Bernstein also authored the CliffsNotes for Ayn Rand's Atlas Shrugged, The Fountainhead, and Anthem; he has contributed essays to volumes such as Essays on Ayn Rand's Anthem and Essays on Ayn Rand's We the Living. Bernstein's op-eds have appeared in publications such as the San Francisco Chronicle, the Chicago Tribune, The Baltimore Sun, The Atlanta Constitution, The Washington Times, The Los Angeles Daily News, and the Houston Chronicle. He has contributed a number of essays, op-eds, and reviews to The Objective Standard. Bernstein is affiliated with the Ayn Rand Institute and the New York Heroes Society, an Ayn Rand advocacy organization. He is also known for his public defense of Objectivism, particularly its support for laissez-faire capitalism.

== Bibliography ==
=== Non-fiction ===
- CliffsNotes on Rand's Atlas Shrugged, 2000
- CliffsNotes on Rand's The Fountainhead, 2000
- The Capitalist Manifesto: The Historic, Economic, and Philosophic Case for Laissez-Faire, 2005
- Objectivism in One Lesson: An Introduction to the Philosophy of Ayn Rand, 2008
- Capitalism Unbound: The Incontestable Case for Individual Rights, 2010
- Capitalist Solutions: A Philosophy of American Moral Dilemmas, 2011
- Heroes, Legends, Champions: Why Heroism Matters, 2020

=== Fiction ===
- Heart of a Pagan: The Story of Swoop, 2002
- A Dearth of Eagles, 2017
