= David Kelley (philosopher) =

American philosopher (born 1949)

- Born: June 23, 1949 (age 77); Shaker Heights, Ohio

Education
- Education: Brown University (BA, MA); Princeton University (PhD)

Philosophical work
- Era: Contemporary philosophy
- Region: Western philosophy
- School: Objectivism; Libertarianism
- Main interests: Epistemology

David Christopher Kelley (born June 23, 1949) is an American philosopher. He is a professed Objectivist, though his position that Objectivism can be revised and influenced by other schools of thought has prompted disagreements with other Objectivists. Kelley is also an author of several books on philosophy and the founder of The Atlas Society, an institution he established in 1990 after permanently dissociating with Leonard Peikoff and the Ayn Rand Institute.

== Education and career ==
David Kelley was born in Shaker Heights, Ohio. He received his Bachelor of Arts and Master of Arts in philosophy from Brown University, where he studied with the American rationalist, Roderick Chisholm. He received his Ph.D. in philosophy from Princeton University in 1975 after completing a doctoral dissertation, titled "The Evidence of the Senses", under the supervision of Richard Rorty. He was an assistant professor of philosophy and cognitive science at Vassar College for seven years. He then taught logic for a brief time at Brandeis University, while working as a freelance writer for Barron's and other publications.

A member of Ayn Rand's circle, Kelley read her favorite poem, "If—", by Rudyard Kipling, at her funeral in 1982.

=== Objectivism's 'open' faction ===
In 1985, Leonard Peikoff and Ed Snider founded the Ayn Rand Institute (ARI), an organization devoted to the study and advocacy of Objectivism. Kelley was initially affiliated with ARI, but in 1989 he was criticized by Peter Schwartz, editor of the Objectivist newsletter The Intellectual Activist, for giving a speech under the auspices of Laissez Faire Books (LFB), a libertarian bookseller. Schwartz argued that this activity violated the Objectivist moral principle of sanction. He said Kelley was implicitly conferring moral approval on LFB by appearing at an event that it sponsored. Schwartz considered LFB morally objectionable because it promoted books, such as The Passion of Ayn Rand, that he maintained were hostile and defamatory towards Rand and Objectivism. Kelley responded with a privately circulated essay titled "A Question of Sanction", which disputed Schwartz's interpretation of the sanction principle. Peikoff subsequently endorsed Schwartz's view and claimed that Kelley's arguments contradicted the fundamental principles of Objectivism. He also declared Objectivism to be a "closed system" containing only the philosophic principles advocated by Rand herself.

Kelley responded to this dispute in a monograph titled Truth and Toleration, later expanded and republished as The Contested Legacy of Ayn Rand. Kelley declared Objectivism to be an "open system" amenable to revision and addition. This disagreement split the Objectivist movement into two factions.

In 1990, he founded the Institute for Objectivist Studies (IOS), a non-profit dedicated to cultural advocacy on behalf of "reason, individualism, achievement, and capitalism." IOS was established to provide an Objectivist alternative to the Ayn Rand Institute. IOS sponsored scholarly work on Objectivism and conducted summer workshops attended by academics and graduate students. In 1999, IOS was renamed The Objectivist Center (TOC), as the organization took on a more public-outreach and advocacy orientation.

In order to pursue his scholarly interests, Kelley stepped down as executive director of TOC in 2004, and the organization was again renamed as The Atlas Society (TAS). Kelley reassumed the position of executive director for TAS in 2008. He retired in 2018, but continues to serve on the organization's board of trustees.

=== Scholarly work ===
Kelley's books cover a variety of subjects within philosophy. They include The Evidence of the Senses, which argues for a unique form of direct realism about perception; Unrugged Individualism, which explores benevolence as a virtue; A Life of One's Own, a moral critique of the welfare state; and The Contested Legacy of Ayn Rand, focusing on the schisms within the Objectivist movement. With Roger Donway, he co-authored Laissez Parler: Freedom in the Electronic Media, a critique of government regulation of broadcasting.

Kelley has published little scholarly work in philosophy since 1998, but has given public addresses, taught courses, and has written articles on politics and current events. An ongoing research and writing project over the past decade has been his magnum opus, The Logical Structure of Objectivism, which he is co-authoring with economist William Thomas. His most recent scholarly article is "Rand Versus Hayek on Abstraction," in the Fall 2011 issue of Reason Papers—a "descriptive and explanatory" account of the similarities and differences between Rand's and Friedrich Hayek's views on cognition and mind.

Kelley was a script consultant for Atlas Shrugged: Part III, the third part in a film version of Rand's novel Atlas Shrugged.

== Works ==
- The Evidence of the Senses: A Realist Theory of Perception (1986) Louisiana State University Press (based on his Princeton PhD dissertation) ISBN 0-8071-1476-6
- A Theory of Abstraction (full text; ISBN 1-57724-062-6) (2001) The Objectivist Center. Originally published in Cognition and Brain Theory, 1984, v. 7 (3 & 4), pp. 329–57.
- "Rand Versus Hayek on Abstraction" (full text, in Reason Papers: A Journal of Interdisciplinary Normative Studies, vol. 33 (Fall 2011), pp. 12–30.
- "Rand and Objectivity" (full text, in Reason Papers: A Journal of Interdisciplinary Normative Studies, vol. 23 (Fall 1998), pp. 83–86.
- Evidence and Justification (full text; ISBN 1-57724-019-7) (1998) The Institute for Objectivist Studies. Originally published in Reason Papers: A Journal of Interdisciplinary Normative Studies, vol. 16, 1991, pp. 165–79.
- The Art of Reasoning (1988) ISBN 0-393-97213-5. Originally published in 1998 by W. W. Norton, it is currently in its fifth edition, and has been well received.
- Unrugged Individualism: The Selfish Basis of Benevolence (1996, rev 2nd ed 2003) ISBN 1-57724-066-9
- A Life of One's Own: Individual Rights and the Welfare State (1998) ISBN 1-882577-71-X
- The Contested Legacy of Ayn Rand: Truth and Toleration in Objectivism (2e full text; ISBN 0-7658-0060-8 and ISBN 1-57724-010-3) (1990, exp 2e 2000)
- Kelley (2008). "Objectivism". In Hamowy, Ronald (ed.). The Encyclopedia of Libertarianism. Thousand Oaks, CA: SAGE; Cato Institute. pp. 363–64. doi:10.4135/9781412965811.n221. ISBN 978-1412965804. LCCN 2008009151. OCLC 750831024.

== See also ==
- American philosophy
- List of American philosophers
