= Tara Smith (philosopher) =

American philosopher (born 1961)

Tara A. Smith
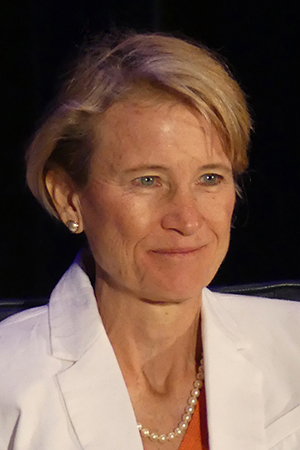
- Born: 1961 (age 64–65)

Education
- Education: University of Virginia (BA); Johns Hopkins University (PhD)

Philosophical work
- School: Objectivism
- Institutions: Ayn Rand Institute
- Main interests: Metaethics, ethical naturalism, virtue ethics, ethical egoism, rational egoism, value theory, political philosophy, natural rights, philosophy of law, constitutional law, objectivity, intrinsicism
- Notable ideas: objective value, virtuous egoism, objective law

Tara A. Smith (born 1961) is an American philosopher. She is a professor of philosophy, the BB&T Chair for the Study of Objectivism, and the Anthem Foundation Fellow for the Study of Objectivism at the University of Texas at Austin.

== Career ==
Smith specializes in moral and political theory. She did her undergraduate work at the University of Virginia and received her doctorate from Johns Hopkins University. Her published works include the books Viable Values: A Study of Life as the Root and Reward of Morality (2000), Moral Rights and Political Freedom (1995), and Ayn Rand's Normative Ethics: The Virtuous Egoist (2006). She is also a contributing author to several essay collections about Ayn Rand's novels. Smith has written in journals such as The Journal of Philosophy, American Philosophical Quarterly, Social Philosophy and Policy, and Law and Philosophy.

Smith has lectured all across the United States including Harvard University, Wheeling Jesuit University, Duke University, University of Pittsburgh, and New York University, and to groups of businessmen. She has also organized conferences, often ones emphasizing objective law.

She is on the board of The Philosopher's Index and is on the Academic Advisory Council of The Clemson Institute for the Study of Capitalism at Clemson University. Smith is a member of the Ayn Rand Society, which exists within the American Philosophical Association. She is also on the board of directors of the Ayn Rand Institute.

== Selected publications ==
=== Books ===
- Moral Rights and Political Freedom. Lanham, Maryland: Rowman & Littlefield. 1997. ISBN 0-8476-8026-6.
- Viable Values: A Study of Life as the Root and Reward of Morality. Lanham, Maryland: Rowman & Littlefield. 2000. ISBN 0-8476-9760-6.
- Ayn Rand's Normative Ethics: The Virtuous Egoist. New York: Cambridge University Press. 2006. ISBN 0-521-86050-4.
- Judicial Review in an Objective Legal System. New York: Cambridge University Press. 2015. ISBN 978-1-107-11449-4.
- Egoism Without Permission: The Moral Psychology of Ayn Rand's Ethics. Pittsburgh, PA: University of Pittsburgh Press. 2024. ISBN 978-0-822-94819-3.
- The First Amendment: Essays on the Imperative of Intellectual Freedom. Ayn Rand Institute Press. 2024. ISBN 979-8-986-27034-0.

=== Articles ===
- Smith, Tara (September 1992). "On Deriving Rights to Goods from Rights to Freedom". Law and Philosophy. 11 (3): 217–234. doi:10.1007/BF01000643. S2CID 145539972.
- Smith, Tara (December 1992). "Why a Teleological Defense of Rights Needn't Yield Welfare Rights". Journal of Social Philosophy. 23 (3): 35–50. doi:10.1111/j.1467-9833.1992.tb00131.x.
- Smith, Tara (September 1995). "Rights Conflicts: The Undoing of Rights". Journal of Social Philosophy. 26 (2): 139–156. doi:10.1111/j.1467-9833.1995.tb00078.x.
- Smith, Tara (April 1997). "Tolerance & Forgiveness: Virtues or Vices?". Journal of Applied Philosophy. 14 (1): 31–41. doi:10.1111/1468-5930.00037.
- Smith, Tara (September 1997). "Reconsidering Zero-Sum Value: It's How You Play the Game". Journal of Social Philosophy. 28 (2): 128–139. doi:10.1111/j.1467-9833.1997.tb00381.x.
- Smith, Tara (September 1998). "Rights, Wrongs, and Aristotelian Egoism: Illuminating the Rights/Care Dichotomy". Journal of Social Philosophy. 29 (2): 5–14. doi:10.1111/j.1467-9833.1998.tb00104.x.
- Smith, Tara (December 1998). "Intrinsic Value: Look-Say Ethics". The Journal of Value Inquiry. 32 (4): 539–553. doi:10.1023/A:1004333128077. S2CID 169146184.
- Smith, Tara (December 1998). "The Practice of Pride". Social Philosophy and Policy. 15 (1): 71–90. doi:10.1017/S0265052500003071. S2CID 145136219.
- Smith, Tara (December 2003). "The Metaphysical Case for Honesty". The Journal of Value Inquiry. 37 (4): 517–531. doi:10.1023/B:INQU.0000019033.95049.1e. S2CID 145321925.
- "'Social' Objectivity and the Objectivity of Value" in Machamer, Peter K. & Wolters, Gereon, eds. (2004). Science, Values, and Objectivity. Pittsburgh, Pennsylvania: University of Pittsburgh Press. ISBN 0-8229-4237-2.
- "Morality Without the Wink: A Defense of Moral Perfection". Journal of Philosophical Research. 29: 315–331. 2004. doi:10.5840/jpr_2004_6.
- "Forbidding Life to Those Still Living" in Mayhew, Robert, ed. (2004). Essays on Ayn Rand's We the Living. Lanham, Maryland: Lexington Books. ISBN 0-7391-0697-X.
- "Independence in The Fountainhead" in Mayhew, Robert, ed. (2006). Essays on Ayn Rand's The Fountainhead. Lanham, Maryland: Lexington Books. ISBN 0-7391-1577-4.
- "Why Originalism Won't Die – Common Mistakes in Competing Theories of Judicial Interpretation". Duke Journal of Constitutional Law & Public Policy. 2: 159–215. 2007.
- Smith, Tara (2008). "The Importance of the Subject in Objective Morality: Distinguishing Objective from Intrinsic Value". Social Philosophy and Policy. 25: 126–148. doi:10.1017/S0265052508080059. S2CID 145275159.
- "'Humanity's Darkest Evil': The Lethal Destructiveness of Non-Objective Law" in Mayhew, Robert, ed. (2009). Essays on Ayn Rand's Atlas Shrugged. Lanham, Maryland: Lexington Books. ISBN 978-0-7391-2779-7.

== See also ==
- American philosophy
- List of American philosophers
