= Richard Foley (philosopher) =

American philosopher

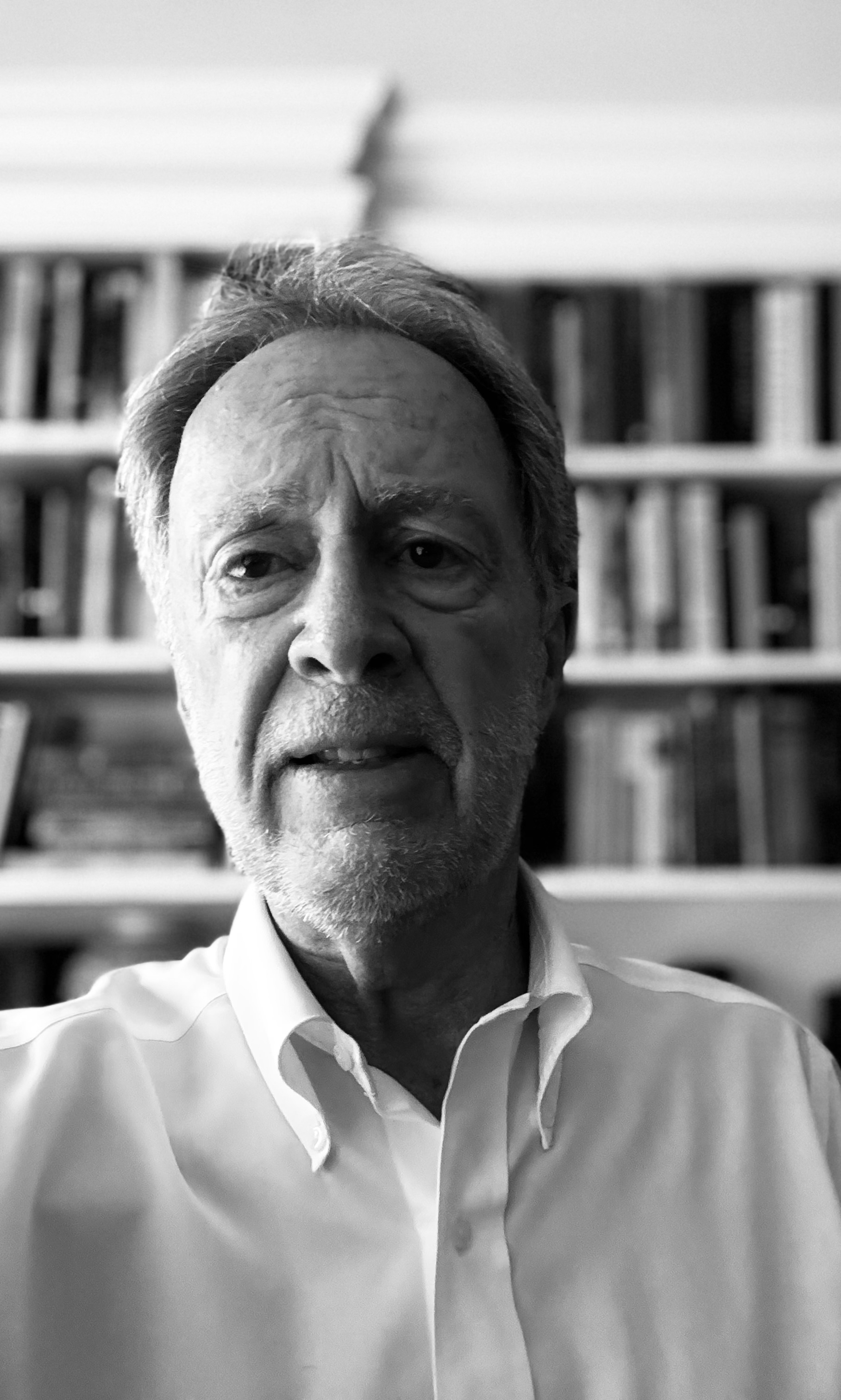
- Foley in 2025
- Born: February 12, 1947 (age 79)

Academic background
- Education: Brown University (Ph.D.) Miami University (BA and MA)

Academic work
- Era: Contemporary philosophy
- School or tradition: Analytic philosophy
- Institutions: New York University Rutgers University University of Notre Dame
- Main interests: Epistemology

Richard Foley is an American philosopher and Emeritus Professor of Philosophy at New York University. He has made contributions to epistemology, the field of philosophy concerned with the theory of justified (or rational) belief and the theory of knowledge.

== Philosophical work ==
Foley is known for defending foundationalism as a theory of justified belief, but his version is more subjective than traditional versions. He develops his theory as an instance of a general conception of rationality that is instrumentalist. Our actions, decisions, intentions, plans, strategies, etc. are rational insofar as we would regard them as effective means to valuable goals were we to be ideally reflective. Analogously, beliefs are justified to the degree that on ideal reflection we would regard them as adequately promoting a distinctly intellectual goal, that of now having accurate beliefs. In his latest book, Foley argues that practical, ethical, and political values are also relevant for determining when we are justified in adopting new beliefs or revising existing ones. On this view, issues in epistemology are not isolated from practical, ethical, and political issues.

Foley is also known for his arguments against coherentism and reliabilism as theories of justified belief. Against coherentism, he draws upon the lottery paradox and the preface paradox to argue that it's possible for obviously inconsistent beliefs to be justified. Against reliabilism, he maintains that one's current evidence about the reliability of the processes leading to one's beliefs is relevant to whether they are justified, but this evidence, like most other evidence, is fallible. The actual reliability of the processes is thus not a strictly necessary condition of justified belief.

In his work on the relationship between belief and probabilistic degrees of confidence (or credences), Foley introduced a thesis that he named the "Lockean Thesis." It asserts that belief is a matter of having a sufficiently high degree of confidence, and rational belief is rationally having a degree of confidence above the threshold required for belief. The Lockean Thesis has important and widely discussed implications for the logic of belief.

Foley's contributions to the theory of knowledge challenge standard solutions to the Gettier Problem. Edmund Gettier's counterexamples against justified true belief accounts of knowledge prompted numerous proposals about a fourth condition that when added to justification, truth, and belief avoids Gettier problems. Foley, by contrast, maintains that the problems can be avoided by detaching the theory of knowledge from the theory of justified belief. We know something if we believe it, it is true, and we don't lack important information about it.

Foley has held a number of university administrative posts. From 2000 to 2009, he was the Anne and Joel Ehrenkranz Dean of the Faculty of Arts and Science at New York University and from 2010 to 2016 the Vice-Chancellor for Strategic Planning. Prior to NYU, he was Executive Dean of Arts and Science, Dean of the Graduate School, and Chair of the Department of Philosophy at Rutgers University, and prior to Rutgers, he was Chair of the Department of Philosophy at the University of Notre Dame. After stepping away from administration, Foley drew upon on his work in epistemology and his experiences in overseeing science, social science, and humanities departments to author a book on the differences between the intellectual aims of the sciences and those of humanities.

== Books ==
- Epistemology with a Broad and Long View, Oxford University Press, 2024. Epistemology with a Broad and Long View
- The Geography of Insight: The Humanities, The Sciences, How They Differ, Why They Matter, Oxford University Press, 2018. The Geography of Insight
- When Is True Belief Knowledge?, Princeton University Press, 2012. When Is True Belief Knowledge?
- Intellectual Trust in Oneself and Others, Cambridge University Press, 2001. Intellectual Trust in Oneself and Others
- Working without a Net, Oxford University Press, 1993. Working Without a Net
- The Theory of Epistemic Rationality, Harvard University Press, 1987. The Theory of Epistemic Rationality
