= Philosophical Problems of Space and Time =

1963 book by Adolf Grünbaum

- Cover of the first edition
- Author: Adolf Grünbaum
- Language: English
- Series: Boston Studies in the Philosophy of Science
- Subject: Philosophy of space and time
- Publisher: Alfred A. Knopf
- Publication date: 1963
- Publication place: United States
- Media type: Print (Hardcover and Paperback)
- Pages: 446 (first edition)/ 884 (second edition)
- ISBN: 978-9027703583

Philosophical Problems of Space and Time is a book on the philosophy of space and time by the philosopher Adolf Grünbaum. It is recognized as a major work in the philosophy of the natural sciences.

== Summary ==
Grünbaum, who acknowledges his debts to the philosopher Hans Reichenbach, discusses the philosophy of space and time, and scientific and mathematical fields such as geometry, chronometry, and geochronometry. He also provides an account of the Philosophiæ Naturalis Principia Mathematica (1687) of the physicist Isaac Newton, as well as the work of other physicists such as Albert Einstein, and that of the mathematician Bernhard Riemann. He criticizes the philosophers Ernest Nagel and Jacques Maritain, arguing that in The Structure of Science (1961) Nagel misinterprets the philosopher of science Henri Poincaré and that in The Degrees of Knowledge (1932) Maritain misinterprets the nature of geometry.

The central themes explored in the book include:

Philosophy of Space:

Grünbaum critically examines the nature of space and questions related to its absolute or relative nature. He explores different theories of space and assesses their implications for our understanding of the physical world.

Philosophy of Time:

Grünbaum addresses the nature of time and its relationship to space. The book discusses the philosophical implications of various theories of time, including the A-theory and B-theory of time. Grünbaum critically analyzes the concept of the present moment and the nature of temporal becoming.

Philosophy of Physics:

The book connects philosophical issues with developments in physics, especially in the context of relativity theory. Grünbaum critically assesses the implications of Einstein's theories of relativity for our understanding of space and time.

Methodological Considerations:

Grünbaum discusses the methodology of philosophy of science and how it can be applied to the study of space and time. He emphasizes the importance of empirical evidence and the need for a rigorous analysis of scientific theories.

== Publication history ==
Philosophical Problems of Space and Time was first published by Alfred A. Knopf in the United States in 1963. In 1964, the book was published by Routledge and Kegan Paul in the United Kingdom. In 1969, a revised version was published in Russian translation in the Soviet Union by Progress Publishers. In 1973, an enlarged section was published in English by D. Reidel Publishing Company, as part of the series Boston Studies in the Philosophy of Science.

== Reception ==
The philosophers Robert S. Cohen and Marx W. Wartofsky stated that Philosophical Problems of Space and Time was "promptly recognized to be one of the few major works in the philosophy of the natural sciences of this generation" upon its original publication. They believed that this was partly because Grünbaum showed devotion to both "actual science and philosophical understanding" and combined "detail with scope." They credited him with dealing with the "problems of space and time" in their "full depth and complexity".

The philosopher Milič Čapek wrote that Grünbaum was, alongside the physicist Olivier Costa de Beauregard, one of the "most vigorous defenders" of the view that time should be treated as equivalent to space. The philosopher Roger Scruton described Philosophical Problems of Space and Time as the most comprehensive discussion of non-Euclidean space, though he added that the work was "far from inviting". The philosopher Philip L. Quinn called Grünbaum's thesis about physical geometry and chronometry "striking".
