= Guillermo Simari =

Argentine computer scientist (born 1948)

Guillermo Ricardo Simari
- Born: Guillermo Ricardo Simari; 30 June 1948 (age 78); Buenos Aires, Argentina
- Education: National University of the South, Washington University in St. Louis
- Known for: Computational Argumentation; 1. Belief revision
- Scientific career
- Fields: Argumentation, Belief revision, Multi-agent system, Artificial Intelligence
- Workplaces: Universidad Nacional del Sur, Professor Emeritus of Logic in Computer Science and Artificial Intelligence
- Thesis: The Mathematics of Defeasible Reasoning and Its Implementation (1989)
- Doctoral advisor: Ronald Prescott Loui

Guillermo Ricardo Simari is an Argentine computer scientist born in the city of Buenos Aires. He has headed the Artificial Intelligence Research and Development Lab (LIDIA) at National University of the South since 1990.

Since December 2018, he has been professor emeritus of logic in computer science and artificial intelligence at National University of the South.

He is co-editor of the Journal of Argument & Computation, and co-editor of the Argumentation Corner of the Journal of Logic and Computation with Francesca Toni and Phan Minh Dung.

He earned his Ph.D. in 1989 at Washington University in St. Louis under the supervision of Ronald Loui.
