= Principles of the Theory of Probability =

1939 book by Ernest Nagel

- Author: Ernest Nagel
- Language: English
- Subject: Probability
- Publisher: University of Chicago Press
- Publication date: 1939
- Publication place: United States
- Media type: Print (Hardcover and Paperback)
- Pages: 87
- ISBN: 978-0226575810

Principles of the Theory of Probability is a 1939 book about probability by the philosopher Ernest Nagel. It is considered a classic discussion of its subject.

== Reception ==
The philosopher Isaac Levi described Principles of the Theory of Probability as a well-known classic. Rudolf Carnap cites Nagel's classification of theories of probability in his paper 'The Two Concepts of Probability' (1945).
