= James G. Lennox =

American philosopher

James G. Lennox (born January 11, 1948) is an emeritus professor in the Department of History and Philosophy of Science at the University of Pittsburgh, United States, with secondary appointments in the departments of Classics and Philosophy. He is a leader in the study of Aristotelian science in light of his groundbreaking work on Aristotle's biology and philosophy of biology. In particular, Lennox's work in the 1980s catalyzed a renewed interest in Aristotle's biology by arguing that his natural historical works are consistent with and even demonstrative of the scientific methodology he lays out in the Posterior Analytics. Lennox's work on teleology in the history of biology, particularly in the thought of Charles Darwin, has also been influential.

Canadian by birth, Lennox is a founding member of the Ayn Rand Society, affiliated with the American Philosophical Association, Eastern Division, and has served frequently on its steering committee. He has also served as the director for the Center for Philosophy of Science at the University of Pittsburgh, the program committee chair for the International Society for the History of Philosophy of Science, and has served on the editorial board of the History of Philosophy Quarterly and Philosophy of Science, among other journals. Fellowships include a senior fellowship at the Istituto di Studi Avanzati in Bologna and a visiting fellowship at the University of Cambridge, where he is a life member of Clare Hall. He also received the Biggs Resident Scholar award in 2010 and was the Dyason Lecturer at the University of Brisbane in 2009, and has received grants from the NEH and the NSF. He previously served as the director of the Center for Philosophy of Science from 1997 to 2005.

His areas of research include Ancient Greek philosophy, science and medicine, and Charles Darwin. His most recent publication is Aristotle on Inquiry: Erotetic Frameworks and Domain-Specific Norms (Cambridge, 2021), an account of Aristotle's approach to scientific inquiry.

== Bibliography ==
- Concepts and their Role in Knowledge: Reflections on Objectivist Epistemology (ed), (with Allan Gotthelf), University of Pittsburgh Press, 2013 ISBN 978-0-8229-4424-9
- Being, Nature, and Life in Aristotle: Essays in Honor of Allan Gotthelf (ed), (with Robert Bolton), Cambridge University Press, 2011 ISBN 978-0-521-76844-3
- Metaethics, Egoism, and Virtue: Studies in Ayn Rand's Normative Theory (Ayn Rand Society Philosophical Studies) (assoc ed), (with Allan Gotthelf as ed.), University of Pittsburgh Press, 2010 ISBN 0-8229-4400-6
- Aristotle: On the Parts of Animals I-IV (Clarendon Aristotle Series) Oxford University Press, 2002 ISBN 0-19-875110-9, ISBN 978-0-19-875110-6
- Aristotle's Philosophy of Biology: Studies in the Origins of Life Science (Cambridge Studies in Philosophy and Biology) Cambridge University Press, 2000 ISBN 0-521-65027-5, ISBN 978-0-521-65027-4.
- Self-Motion: From Aristotle to Newton (ed), (with Mary Louise Gill), Princeton University Press, 1994 ISBN 0-691-03235-1, ISBN 978-0-691-03235-1.
- Philosophical Issues in Aristotle's Biology (ed), (with Allan Gotthelf), Cambridge University Press, 1987 ISBN 0-521-31091-1.
