= The Structure of Science =

1961 book by Ernest Nagel

The Structure of Science: Problems in the Logic of Scientific Explanation
- Cover of the first edition
- Author: Ernest Nagel
- Language: English
- Subject: Philosophy of science
- Publisher: Harcourt, Brace & World
- Publication date: 1961
- Publication place: United States
- Media type: Print (Hardcover and Paperback)
- Pages: 618
- ISBN: 978-0915144716

The Structure of Science: Problems in the Logic of Scientific Explanation is a 1961 book about the philosophy of science by the philosopher Ernest Nagel, in which the author discusses the nature of scientific inquiry with reference to both natural science and social science. Nagel explores the role of reduction in scientific theories and the relationship of wholes to their parts, and also evaluates the views of philosophers such as Isaiah Berlin.

The book received positive reviews, as well as some more mixed assessments. It is considered a classic work, and commentators have praised it for Nagel's discussion of reductionism and holism, as well as for his criticism of Berlin. However, critics of The Structure of Science have found Nagel's discussion of social science less convincing than his discussion of natural science.

== Summary ==
Nagel describes the book as "an essay in the philosophy of science" concerned with "analyzing the logic of scientific inquiry and the logical structure of its intellectual products", adding that it was written for a larger audience than only "professional students of philosophy". He discusses branches of natural science such as physics and social sciences such as history. Topics discussed include the role of reduction in scientific theories and the relationship of wholes to their parts. Nagel also discusses the philosopher of science Henri Poincaré and criticizes the philosopher Isaiah Berlin.

== Publication history ==
The Structure of Science was first published by Harcourt, Brace & World in 1961.

== Reception ==
The Structure of Science is considered a classic work. The book has been praised by philosophers such as Horace Romano Harré, Douglas Hofstadter, Alexander Rosenberg, Isaac Levi, Roger Scruton, and Colin Klein, as well as by the historian Peter Gay and the economists H. Scott Gordon and Grażyna Musiał. It was described by Harré as the "best single book on the philosophy of science". Nagel's discussions of reductionism and holism and teleological and non-teleological explanations have been praised by Hofstadter, while his discussion of the "dispute over the nature of theories and theoretical terms" has been praised by Scruton. Klein believed that Nagel, despite flaws in his account of reduction, provided a largely correct account of "intertheoretic connection". While he wrote that discussions of the role of reduction in scientific explanation published after The Structure of Science moved away from Nagel's views because of perceived shortcomings in Nagel's theory, he considered this trend a mistake. Gay considered the book an important and clear exposition of positivism. He credited Nagel with refuting opposing points of view. In 1990, he described the book as one on which "many of us grew up", and stated that it "remains valuable". Gordon credited Nagel with providing the best modern examination of the possibility of establishing a science independent of moral value judgments. However, he was unconvinced by Nagel's conclusion that it is possible to do this in the case of the study of social phenomena. He found Nagel's case that it was possible in the case of the natural sciences more convincing. Musiał wrote that the book was "a source of inspiring conclusions" and is regarded as one of the "fundamental works on the contemporary methodology of science." She added that Nagel's "position left numerous opened questions that were further developed" by other authors. She concluded that The Structure of Science is "still a valuable reading for junior research workers in economics who wish to reinforce their knowledge."

The book received positive reviews from the philosopher A. J. Ayer in Scientific American, the sociologist Otis Dudley Duncan in American Sociological Review, the philosopher G. B. Keene in Philosophy, and the philosopher Michael Scriven in The Review of Metaphysics. The book received mixed reviews from the philosopher Raziel Abelson in Commentary and the philosopher Paul Feyerabend in the British Journal for the Philosophy of Science, and a negative review from William Gilman in The Nation.

Ayer described the book as a well-written work that avoided being overly technical, should have wide appeal, and was an "important contribution toward the essential task of building a bridge between philosophy and science." He credited Nagel with providing a diverse range of examples in his discussion of scientific explanation, and considered his views about geometry and physics, while not novel, to be "sensible and convincing"; he complimented Nagel for his discussion of history and the social sciences, and praised his discussion of "the question of causality and indeterminism." However, he was not fully satisfied by Nagel's discussion of the distinction between a scientific law and a "generalization of fact".

Duncan credited Nagel with clarifying ideas such as those of cause, model, and analogy and demonstrating that at least some sciences can reach a high state of development without resolving all questions about their underlying concepts. He also complimented Nagel's discussions of both reductionism and the social sciences, including history. However, he believed that Nagel should have put more effort into explaining "how explanations of statistical generalizations are effected."

Keene described the book as "an admirable model of methodical inquiry", with only minor defects. He praised Nagel for the thoroughness of his treatment of the nature of scientific inquiry, his discussion of explanation in the biological sciences, his criticism of functionalism in the social sciences, and his discussion of historical explanation. Scriven described the book as a "great work", and considered Nagel's treatment of some subjects definitive. He praised Nagel's discussion of the history of science and careful analysis of "alternative positions", pointing in particular to Nagel's "discussion of the ontological status of theories and models" and "his treatment of fallacious arguments for holism"; he also complimented Nagel for his criticism of Berlin and his discussion of the meaning of scientific laws. However, he noted that the book was not easy to read; he also criticized Nagel for being too willing to accept the analyses of certain concepts proposed by symbolic logicians, for failing to fully pursue the implications of his ideas about scientific practice, giving his treatment of historical explanation as an example. Though he found Nagel's analysis of teleological explanations "thorough and enlightening", he was not fully satisfied by Nagel's conclusions about their distinguishing features. He found Nagel's criticism of approaches in the social sciences less convincing than other parts of the book.

Abelson considered the book's publication an important event in American philosophy. He credited Nagel with consolidating the rival insights of logical positivism and pragmatism, demonstrating how four different kinds of explanation function in different types of inquiry, refuting the view that science does nothing more than describe "sequences of phenomena", and convincingly criticizing Berlin. However, he argued that Nagel's account of science was strained and that some of Nagel's views were unclear. He believed that Nagel was less successful in discussing sociology and history than he was in discussing the natural sciences. He also charged Nagel with vacillating between the "mechanistic" view of social knowledge and that of "pragmatic pluralism", arguing that each of these perspectives has merit, but only when adopted with full commitment. Feyerabend credited Nagel with adding significant detail to the "hypothetico-deductive account" of explanation, and with making interesting observations about "the cognitive status of theories." However, he argued that Nagel neglected the larger issue of the "cognitive status of all notions of our language" and that his account of reduction was flawed.

Gilman considered Nagel's objective of helping a wide audience to understand scientific method laudable, but found the book poorly written and repetitive. He suggested that Nagel might have personal reasons for favoring belief in determinism over belief in free will, and criticized him for failing to discuss the relationship between science and "big business". He concluded that, "the reader who mistrusts science will remain mistrustful after reading the book." The book has also been criticized by the philosophers Adolf Grünbaum and Michael Ruse. Grünbaum criticized Nagel for misinterpreting Poincaré, while Ruse maintained that while The Structure of Science was Nagel's "definitive work", the philosopher Thomas Kuhn's The Structure of Scientific Revolutions (1962) discredited its "ahistorical and prescriptive" approach to the philosophy of science.
