= John L. Pollock =

American philosopher (1940–2009)

- Born: 1940; Atchison, Kansas, US
- Died: 2009 (aged 68–69)

Education
- Education: University of California, Berkeley

Philosophical work
- Region: Western philosophy
- School: Analytic
- Main interests: Epistemology, philosophical logic, cognitive science

John L. Pollock (1940–2009) was an American philosopher known for influential work in epistemology, philosophical logic, cognitive science, and artificial intelligence.

== Life and career ==
Born John Leslie Pollock in Atchison, Kansas, on January 28, 1940, Pollock earned a triple-major physics, mathematics, and philosophy degree at the University of Minnesota in 1961. In 1965, his doctoral dissertation Analyticity and Implication at the University of California, Berkeley was advised by Ernest Adams (making Pollock an intellectual descendant of Gottfried Leibniz and Immanuel Kant, through Ernest Nagel and Patrick Suppes). This dissertation contained an appendix on defeasible reasoning that would eventually blossom into his main contribution to philosophy.

Pollock held faculty positions at SUNY Buffalo, University of Rochester, University of Michigan, and University of Arizona, where he spent most of his career. At Arizona, he helped found the Cognitive Science Program. He was an avid mountain biker and founded a riding club in Southern Arizona.

== Philosophical work ==
=== Knowledge and Justification ===
Knowledge and Justification is the book that established Pollock in epistemology. It appeared at a time when American philosophy, and especially American epistemology, was obsessed with the analysis of what it means to know something. For instance, the Gettier problem, one of the most frequently discussed problems of the day, asks why it is that holding a "justified true belief" that x is not equivalent to knowing that x. Pollock's book steps back from trying to identify the "analytic criteria" which might constitute the necessary and sufficient conditions for knowledge. His epistemic norms are governed by defeasible reasoning; they are ceteris paribus conditions that can admit exceptions. Several other epistemologists (notably at Brown University, such as Ernest Sosa, and especially Roderick Chisholm), as well as his Arizona colleague Keith Lehrer, had written about defeasibility and epistemology. But Pollock's book, which combined a broad scope and a crucial innovation, brought the ideas into the philosophical mainstream.

=== Defeasible Reasoning ===
Pollock became known as "Mr. Defeasible Reasoning" among philosophers in the two decades before his death. In artificial intelligence, where non-monotonic reasoning had caused intellectual upheaval, scholars sympathetic to Pollock's work held him in great esteem for his early commitment and clarity. Pollock's most direct pronouncement is the paper "Defeasible reasoning" in Cognitive Science, 1987, though his non-syntactic ideas were almost fully mature in Knowledge and Justification. Pollock traced the history of his own thinking (e.g., in a footnote in Pollock and Cruz, Contemporary Theories of Knowledge, 1999, p. 36, note 37, and elsewhere) to his first paper on epistemology, "Criteria and our knowledge of the material world," Philosophical Review 76, 1967. He thought that Roderick Chisholm had influenced his thinking on the subject, but he also said he was attempting to interpret Ludwig Wittgenstein directly, and sometimes credited Stephen Toulmin on the subject of argument. Although his work had considerable impact in the area of Artificial intelligence and law, Pollock was not himself interested much in jurisprudence or theories of legal reasoning, and he never acknowledged the inheritance of defeasible reasoning through H.L.A. Hart. Pollock also held informal logicians and scholars of rhetoric at a distance, though defeasible reasoning has natural affinities in argument.

Pollock's "undercutting defeat" and "rebutting defeat" are now fixtures in the defeasible reasoning literature. He later added "self-defeat" and other kinds of defeat mechanisms, but the original distinction remains the most popular.

Although aided by a strong tail wind from AI and a few contemporary like minded philosophers (e.g., Donald Nute, Nicholas Asher, Bob Causey), it is certain that defeasible reasoning went from the obscure to the mainstream in philosophy because of John Pollock, in the short time between the publication of Knowledge and Justification and the second edition of Contemporary Theories of Knowledge.

=== OSCAR / How to Build a Person ===
Pollock devoted considerable time later in his career to a software project called OSCAR, an artificial intelligence software prototype he called an "artilect". OSCAR was largely an implementation of Pollock's ideas on defeasible reasoning, but it also embodied his less well known and often unpublished ideas about intentions, interests, strategies for problem solving, and other cognitive architectural design. OSCAR was a LISP-based program that had an "interest-based" reasoner. Pollock claimed that the efficiency of his theorem-prover was based on its unwillingness to draw "uninteresting" conclusions. Although OSCAR did not benefit from the contributions of a large number of professional programmers, it must be compared to CyC, Soar (cognitive architecture), and Novamente for its inventor's ambition.

Pollock described Oscar's main features as the ability to reason defeasibly about perception, change and persistence, causation, probabilities, plan construction and evaluation, and decision. He described the evolution of Oscar in the Fable of Oscar in his book.

OSCAR grew out of the Prologemena on How to Build a Person, which colleagues must have assumed was a facetious use of personhood at the time. However, Pollock's own attitude toward OSCAR was more machinating: he looked forward to future cognitive taxonomies that would classify OSCAR generously as a legitimate anthropomorphic form.

=== Nomic Probability ===
Nomic Probability and the Foundations of Induction, Oxford, 1990 was Pollock's deep investigation of the relationship between defeasible reasoning and the estimation of probability from frequencies (direct inference of probability). It is a maturation of ideas originally found in a 1983 Theory and Decision paper. This work must be compared to Henry E. Kyburg's theories of probability, although Pollock believed that he was theorizing about a broader variety of statistical inferences.

== Publications ==
=== Books ===
- Introduction to Symbolic Logic, Holt Rinehart Winston, 1969.
- Knowledge and Justification, Princeton, 1974.
- Subjunctive Reasoning, Springer, 1976.
- Language and Thought, Princeton, 1982.
- The Foundations of Philosophical Semantics, Princeton, 1984.
- Contemporary Theories of Knowledge, first edition, Rowman-Littlefield, 1987.
- How to Build a Person: A prolegomenon, MIT Press, 1989.
- Technical Methods in Philosophy, Westview, 1990.
- Nomic Probability and The Foundations of Induction, Oxford, 1990.
- Philosophy and AI: Essays at the Interface, with R. Cummins, MIT Press, 1995.
- Cognitive Carpentry: A blueprint for how to build a person, MIT Press, 1995.
- Contemporary Theories of Knowledge, with J. Cruz, second edition, Rowman-Littlefield, 1999.
- Thinking about Acting: Logical Foundations for Rational Decision Making, Oxford, 2006.

=== Selected papers ===
- "Criteria and our knowledge of the material world," The Philosophical Review, 1967.
- "Basic modal logic," Journal of Symbolic Logic, 1967.
- "What Is an Epistemological Problem? American Philosophical Quarterly, 1968.
- "The structure of epistemic justification," American Philosophical Quarterly, 1970.
- "Perceptual knowledge," The Philosophical Review, 1971.
- "The logic of projectibility," Philosophy of Science, 1972.
- "Subjunctive generalizations," Synthese, 1974.
- "Four Kinds of Conditionals," American Philosophical Quarterly, 1975.
- "The 'possible worlds' analysis of counterfactuals," Philosophical Studies, 1976.
- "Thinking about an Object," Midwest Studies in Philosophy, 1980.
- "A refined theory of counterfactuals," Journal of Philosophical Logic, 1981.
- "Epistemology and probability," Synthese, 1983.
- "How Do You Maximize Expectation Value?" Nous, 1983.
- "A theory of direct inference," Theory and Decision, 1983.
- "A solution to the problem of induction," Nous, 1984.
- "Reliability and justified belief," Canadian Journal of Philosophy, 1984.
- "A theory of moral reasoning," Ethics, 1986.
- "The Paradox of the Preface," Philosophy of Science, 1986.
- "Epistemic norms," Synthese, 1987.
- "Defeasible reasoning," Cognitive Science, 1987.
- "How To Build a Person: The Physical Basis for Mentality," Philosophical Perspectives, 1987.
- "My brother, the machine," Nous, 1988.
- "OSCAR: A general theory of rationality," Journal of Experimental and Theoretical Artificial Intelligence, 1989.
- "Interest driven suppositional reasoning," Journal of Automated Reasoning, 1990.
- "Self-defeating arguments," Minds and Machines, 1991.
- "A theory of defeasible reasoning," International Journal of Intelligent Systems, 1991.
- "New foundations for practical reasoning," Minds and Machines, 1992.
- "How to reason defeasibly," Artificial Intelligence, 1992.
- "The theory of nomic probability," Synthese, 1992.
- "The phylogeny of rationality," Cognitive Science, 1993.
- "Foundations for direct inference," Theory and Decision, 1994.
- "Justification and defeat," Artificial Intelligence, 1994.
- "The projectibility constraint," in Grue! The New Riddle of Induction, ed. Douglas Stalker, Open Court, 1994.
- "Implementing defeasible reasoning," Workshop on Computational Dialectics - FAPR, 1996.
- "Oscar - A general-purpose defeasible reasoner," Journal of Applied Nonclassical Logics, 1996.
- "Proving the non-existence of God," Inquiry : An Interdisciplinary Journal of Philosophy, 1996.
- "Taking perception seriously," Proceedings of the first international conference on Autonomous Agents, 1997.
- "Reasoning about change and persistence: A solution to the frame problem," Nous, 1997.
- "The logical foundations of goal-regression planning in autonomous agents," Artificial Intelligence, 1998.
- "Perceiving and reasoning about a changing world," Computational Intelligence, 1998.
- "Procedural Epistemology," in The Digital Phoenix: How Computers are Changing Philosophy, Bynum and Moor, eds., Wiley, 1998.
- "Planning Agents," in Foundations of Rational Agency, ed. Rao and Wooldridge, Kluwer, 1999.
- "Belief revision and epistemology," with AS Gillies, Synthese, 2000.
- "Rational cognition in OSCAR," Lecture Notes in Computer Science, 2000.
- "Defeasible reasoning with variable degrees of justification," Artificial Intelligence, 2001.
- "Causal probability," Synthese, 2002.
- "The logical foundations of means-end reasoning," Common Sense, Reasoning, & Rationality, 2002.
- "Rational choice and action omnipotence," The Philosophical Review, 2002.
- "Plans and decisions," Theory and Decision, 2004.
- "What Am I? Virtual machines and the mind/body problem," Philosophy and Phenomenological Research, 2008.
