= Philosophy of Science (journal) =

- Discipline: Philosophy of science
- Language: English
- Edited by: James Owen Weatherall

Publication details
- History: 1934–present
- Publisher: Cambridge University Press on behalf of the Philosophy of Science Association (United States)
- Frequency: 5/year
- Impact factor: 1.296 (2019)

Standard abbreviations
- ISO 4: Philos. Sci.

Indexing
- CODEN: PHSCA6
- ISSN: 0031-8248 (print); 1539-767X (web)
- JSTOR: 00318248
- OCLC no.: 01606760

Links
- Journal homepage

Philosophy of Science is dedicated to the furthering of studies and free discussion from diverse standpoints in the philosophy of science. It is a peer-reviewed academic journal.

== Official affiliations ==
In January 1934 Philosophy of Science announced itself as the chief external expression of the Philosophy of Science Association, which seems to have been the expectation of its founder, William Malisoff. The journal is currently the official journal of the Association, which Philipp Frank and C. West Churchman formally constituted in December 1947.

== Publication history ==
Malisoff, who was independently wealthy, seems to have financed the launch of Philosophy of Science. Correspondingly he became its first editor. In the first issue he sought papers ranging from studies on "the analysis of meaning, definition, symbolism," in scientific theories to those on "the nature and formulation of theoretical principles" and "in the function and significance of science within various contexts." Its initial editorial board comprised Eric Temple Bell, Albert Blumberg, Rudolf Carnap, Morris Raphael Cohen, W.W. Cook, Herbert Feigl, Karl S. Lashley, Henry Margenau, Hermann Joseph Muller, Susan Stebbing, Dirk Jan Struik and Alexander Weinstein.

C. West Churchman became the second editor of Philosophy of Science upon the untimely death of William Malisoff. Churchman resigned as editor in January 1957, after which Richard Rudner, his friend and former student took over. Subsequent editors include Kenneth F. Schaffner, the philosopher and medical doctor, and Philip Kitcher. Currently the editor-in-chief is James Owen Weatherall and the editorial office is hosted by the Department of Logic and Philosophy of Science at the University of California, Irvine.

Philosophy of Science was originally published in 1934 by The Williams and Wilkins Company of Baltimore, Maryland, which upon the death of Malisoff offered to bear the occasional losses of the journal and to share fifty-fifty in its profits. It is currently published by the Cambridge University Press on behalf of the Philosophy of Science Association. The journal contains essays, discussion articles, and book reviews in the field of the philosophy of science.

Philosophy of Science was originally published quarterly. It is currently published four times a year, with a fifth issue each year containing proceedings from the biannual PSA meeting.

== Abstracting and indexing ==
The services in which articles that appear in Philosophy of Science are abstracted and indexed, and are listed in the Abstracting and Indexing page of the website of the journal. The current impact factor of the journal appears in the About The Journal page in the website of the journal.

== Landmark papers ==
- Einstein, Albert (1934). "On the method of theoretical physics". Philosophy of Science. 1 (2): 163-169.
- Rosenblueth, Arturo; Wiener, Norbert; Bigelow, Julian (1943). "Behavior, purpose and teleology". Philosophy of Science. 10 (1): 18-24.
