= Defeasible reasoning =

Reasoning that is rationally compelling, though not deductively valid

In philosophy of logic, defeasible reasoning is a kind of provisional reasoning that is rationally compelling, though not deductively valid. It usually occurs when a rule is given, but there may be specific exceptions to the rule, or subclasses that are subject to a different rule. Defeasibility is found in literatures that are concerned with argument and the process of argument, or heuristic reasoning.

Defeasible reasoning is a particular kind of non-demonstrative reasoning, where the reasoning does not produce a full, complete, or final demonstration of a claim, i.e., where fallibility and corrigibility of a conclusion are acknowledged. In other words, defeasible reasoning produces a contingent statement or claim. Defeasible reasoning is also a kind of ampliative reasoning because its conclusions reach beyond the pure meanings of the premises.

Defeasible reasoning finds its fullest expression in jurisprudence, ethics and moral philosophy, epistemology, pragmatics and conversational conventions in linguistics, constructivist decision theories, and in knowledge representation and planning in artificial intelligence. It is also closely identified with prima facie (presumptive) reasoning (i.e., reasoning on the "face" of evidence), and ceteris paribus (default) reasoning (i.e., reasoning, all things "being equal").

According to at least some schools of philosophy, all reasoning is at most defeasible, and there is no such thing as absolutely certain deductive reasoning, since it is impossible to be absolutely certain of all the facts, or to know with certainty that nothing is unknown. Thus all deductive reasoning is in reality contingent and defeasible.

== Other kinds of non-demonstrative reasoning ==
Other kinds of non-demonstrative reasoning are probabilistic reasoning, inductive reasoning, statistical reasoning, abductive reasoning, and paraconsistent reasoning.

The differences between these kinds of reasoning correspond to differences about the conditional that each kind of reasoning uses, and on what premise (or on what authority) the conditional is adopted:

- Deductive (from meaning postulate or axiom): if p then q (equivalent to q or not-p in classical logic, not necessarily in other logics)
- Defeasible (from authority): if p then (defeasibly) q
- Probabilistic (from combinatorics and indifference): if p then (probably) q
- Statistical (from data and presumption): the frequency of qs among ps is high (or inference from a model fit to data); hence, (in the right context) if p then (probably) q
- Inductive (theory formation; from data, coherence, simplicity, and confirmation): (inducibly) "if p then q"; hence, if p then (deducibly-but-revisably) q
- Abductive (from data and theory): p and q are correlated, and q is sufficient for p; hence, if p then (abductively) q as cause

== History ==
Though Aristotle differentiated the forms of reasoning that are valid for logic and philosophy from the more general ones that are used in everyday life (see dialectics and rhetoric), 20th century philosophers mainly concentrated on deductive reasoning. At the end of the 19th century, logic texts would typically survey both demonstrative and non-demonstrative reasoning, often giving more space to the latter. However, after the blossoming of mathematical logic at the hands of Bertrand Russell, Alfred North Whitehead and Willard Van Orman Quine, latter-20th century logic texts paid little attention to the non-deductive modes of inference.

There are several notable exceptions. John Maynard Keynes wrote his dissertation on non-demonstrative reasoning, and influenced the thinking of Ludwig Wittgenstein on this subject. Wittgenstein, in turn, had many admirers, including the positivist legal scholar H. L. A. Hart and the speech act linguist John L. Austin, Stephen Toulmin and Chaïm Perelman in rhetoric, the moral theorists W. D. Ross and C. L. Stevenson, and the vagueness epistemologist/ontologist Friedrich Waismann.

The etymology of defeasible usually refers to Middle English law of contracts, where a condition of defeasance is a clause that can invalidate or annul a contract or deed. Though defeat, dominate, defer, defy, deprecate and derogate are often used in the same contexts as defease, the verbs annul and invalidate (and nullify, overturn, rescind, vacate, repeal, void, cancel, countermand, preempt, etc.) are more properly correlated with the concept of defeasibility than those words beginning with the letter d. Many dictionaries do contain the verb, to defease with past participle, defeased.

Philosophers in moral theory and rhetoric had taken defeasibility largely for granted when American epistemologists rediscovered Wittgenstein's thinking on the subject: John Ladd, Roderick Chisholm, Roderick Firth, Ernest Sosa, Robert Nozick, and John L. Pollock all began writing with new conviction about how appearance as red was only a defeasible reason for believing something to be red. More importantly Wittgenstein's orientation toward language-games (and away from semantics) emboldened these epistemologists to manage rather than to expurgate prima facie logical inconsistency.

At the same time (in the mid-1960s), two more students of Hart and Austin at Oxford, Brian Barry and David Gauthier, were applying defeasible reasoning to political argument and practical reasoning (of action), respectively. Joel Feinberg and Joseph Raz were beginning to produce equally mature works in ethics and jurisprudence informed by defeasibility.

By far the most significant works on defeasibility by the mid-1970s were in epistemology, where John Pollock's 1974 Knowledge and Justification popularized his terminology of undercutting and rebutting (which mirrored the analysis of Toulmin). Pollock's work was significant precisely because it brought defeasibility so close to philosophical logicians. The failure of logicians to dismiss defeasibility in epistemology (as Cambridge's logicians had done to Hart decades earlier) landed defeasible reasoning in the philosophical mainstream.

Defeasibility had always been closely related to argument, rhetoric, and law, except in epistemology, where the chains of reasons, and the origin of reasons, were not often discussed. Nicholas Rescher's Dialectics is an example of how difficult it was for philosophers to contemplate more complex systems of defeasible reasoning. This was in part because proponents of informal logic became the keepers of argument and rhetoric while insisting that formalism was anathema to argument.

About this time, researchers in artificial intelligence became interested in non-monotonic reasoning and its semantics. With philosophers such as Pollock and Donald Nute (e.g., defeasible logic), dozens of computer scientists and logicians produced complex systems of defeasible reasoning between 1980 and 2000. No single system of defeasible reasoning would emerge in the same way that Quine's system of logic became a de facto standard. Nevertheless, the 100-year headstart on non-demonstrative logical calculi, due to George Boole, Charles Sanders Peirce, and Gottlob Frege was being closed: both demonstrative and non-demonstrative reasoning now have formal calculi.

There are related (and slightly competing) systems of reasoning that are newer than systems of defeasible reasoning, e.g., belief revision and dynamic logic. The dialogue logics of Charles Hamblin and Jim Mackenzie, and their colleagues, can also be tied closely to defeasible reasoning. Belief revision is a non-constructive specification of the desiderata with which, or constraints according to which, epistemic change takes place. Dynamic logic is related mainly because, like paraconsistent logic, the reordering of premises can change the set of justified conclusions. Dialogue logics introduce an adversary, but are like belief revision theories in their adherence to deductively consistent states of belief.

== Political and judicial use ==
Many political philosophers have been fond of the word indefeasible when referring to rights that were inalienable, divine, or indubitable.

For instance, the 1776 Virginia Declaration of Rights notes "community hath an indubitable, inalienable, and indefeasible right to reform, alter or abolish government..." (also attributed to James Madison); and John Adams, "The people have a right, an indisputable, unalienable, indefeasible, divine right to that most dreaded and envied kind of knowledge – I mean of the character and conduct of their rulers." Also, Lord Aberdeen: "indefeasible right inherent in the British Crown" and Gouverneur Morris: "the Basis of our own Constitution is the indefeasible Right of the People." Scholarship about Abraham Lincoln often cites these passages in the justification of secession.

In judicial opinions, the use of defeasible is commonplace. There is however disagreement among legal logicians whether defeasible reasoning is central, e.g., in the consideration of open texture, precedent, exceptions, and rationales, or whether it applies only to explicit defeasance clauses. H.L.A. Hart in The Concept of Law gives two famous examples of defeasibility: "No vehicles in the park" (except during parades); and "Offer, acceptance, and memorandum produce a contract" (except when the contract is illegal, the parties are minors, inebriated, or incapacitated, etc.).

== Specificity ==
One of the main disputes among those who produce systems of defeasible reasoning is the status of a rule of specificity. In its simplest form, it is the same rule as subclass inheritance preempting class inheritance:

 (R1) if r then (defeasibly) q                  e.g., if bird, then can fly
 (R2) if p then (defeasibly) not-q              e.g., if penguin, then cannot fly
 (O1) if p then (deductively) r                 e.g., if penguin, then bird
 (M1) arguably, p                               e.g., arguably, penguin
 (M2) R2 is a more specific reason than R1      e.g., R2 is better than R1
 (M3) therefore, arguably, not-q                e.g., therefore, arguably, cannot fly

Approximately half of the systems of defeasible reasoning discussed today adopt a rule of specificity, while half expect that such preference rules be written explicitly by whoever provides the defeasible reasons. For example, Rescher's dialectical system uses specificity, as do early systems of multiple inheritance (e.g., David Touretzky) and the early argument systems of Donald Nute and of Guillermo Simari and Ronald Loui. Defeasible reasoning accounts of precedent (stare decisis and case-based reasoning) also make use of specificity (e.g., Joseph Raz and the work of Kevin D. Ashley and Edwina Rissland). Meanwhile, the argument systems of Henry Prakken and Giovanni Sartor, of Bart Verheij and Jaap Hage, and the system of Phan Minh Dung do not adopt such a rule.

== Nature of defeasibility ==
There is a distinct difference between those who theorize about defeasible reasoning as if it were a system of confirmational revision (with affinities to belief revision), and those who theorize about defeasibility as if it were the result of further (non-empirical) investigation. There are at least three kinds of further non-empirical investigation: progress in a lexical/syntactic process, progress in a computational process, and progress in an adversary or legal proceeding.

Defeasibility as corrigibility
Here, a person learns something new that annuls a prior inference. In this case, defeasible reasoning provides a constructive mechanism for belief revision, like a truth maintenance system as envisioned by Jon Doyle.

Defeasibility as shorthand for preconditions
Here, the author of a set of rules or legislative code is writing rules with exceptions. Sometimes a set of defeasible rules can be rewritten, with more cogency, with explicit (local) pre-conditions instead of (non-local) competing rules. Many non-monotonic systems with fixed-point or preferential semantics fit this view. However, sometimes the rules govern a process of argument (the last view on this list), so that they cannot be re-compiled into a set of deductive rules lest they lose their force in situations with incomplete knowledge or incomplete derivation of preconditions.

Defeasibility as an anytime algorithm
Here, it is assumed that calculating arguments takes time, and at any given time, based on a subset of the potentially constructible arguments, a conclusion is defeasibly justified. Isaac Levi has protested against this kind of defeasibility, but it is well-suited to the heuristic projects of, for example, Herbert A. Simon. On this view, the best move so far in a chess-playing program's analysis at a particular depth is a defeasibly justified conclusion. This interpretation works with either the prior or the next semantical view.

Defeasibility as a means of controlling an investigative or social process
Here, justification is the result of the right kind of procedure (e.g., a fair and efficient hearing), and defeasible reasoning provides impetus for pro and con responses to each other. Defeasibility has to do with the alternation of verdict as locutions are made and cases presented, not the changing of a mind with respect to new (empirical) discovery. Under this view, defeasible reasoning and defeasible argumentation refer to the same phenomenon.

== See also ==
- Argument – Attempt to persuade or to determine the truth of a conclusion
- Artificial intelligence and law – Information science by discipline
- Defeasible estate – Estate created when land is transferred conditionally
- Hasty generalization – Conclusion made on the basis of one or few instances of a phenomenon
- Indefeasible rights of use – Telecommunications lease agreement
- Practical reason – Use of reason to decide how to act
- Defeater
