= James Owen Weatherall =

American philosopher

James Owen Weatherall is an American physicist, mathematician, and philosopher.

He is Chancellor's Professor in the Department of Logic and Philosophy of Science at the University of California, Irvine. Since January 2023, he has been editor-in-chief of Philosophy of Science (journal), the official journal of the Philosophy of Science Association. In 2026, he was elected to the American Academy of Arts and Sciences.

He is married to philosopher Cailin O'Connor.

== Books ==
- The Physics of Wall Street (Houghton Mifflin Harcourt, 2013)
- Void: The Strange Physics of Nothing (Yale University Press, 2016)
- The Misinformation Age: How False Beliefs Spread with Cailin O'Connor (Yale University Press, 2019)
- The Aim and Structure of Cosmological Theory with Chris Smeenk (Oxford University Press, upcoming)
