= Center for Philosophy of Science =

Academic organization

- Formation: 1960
- Type: Philosophy of science
- Location: Pittsburgh, Pennsylvania, U.S.
- Director: Edouard Machery
- Co-Chairman: Adolf Grünbaum
- Co-Chairman: Nicholas Rescher
- Affiliations: University of Pittsburgh
- Website: www.pitt.edu/~pittcntr

The Center for Philosophy of Science is an academic center located at the University of Pittsburgh in Pittsburgh, Pennsylvania, dedicated to research in the philosophy of science. The center was founded by Adolf Grünbaum in 1960. The current director of the center is Edouard Machery.

== Overview ==
Currently, the center hosts the Visiting Fellows Program, the Postdoctoral Fellowship Program, the Senior Visiting Fellows program, and the Annual Lecture Series.

Additionally, every four years the center hosts the International Fellows Conference for current and former fellows. In 2001, in conjunction with the University Library System, the Center created and operates PhilSci-Archive (philsci-archive.pitt.edu), a preprint server for professional work in philosophy of science. The center has international partnerships with the University of Konstanz, the University of Athens, the National Technical University of Athens, the University of A Coruña, the University of Catania, and Tsinghua University.

In 2016, John D. Norton stepped down after a ten-year tenure as the director of the center. The current director is Edouard Machery.

== History ==
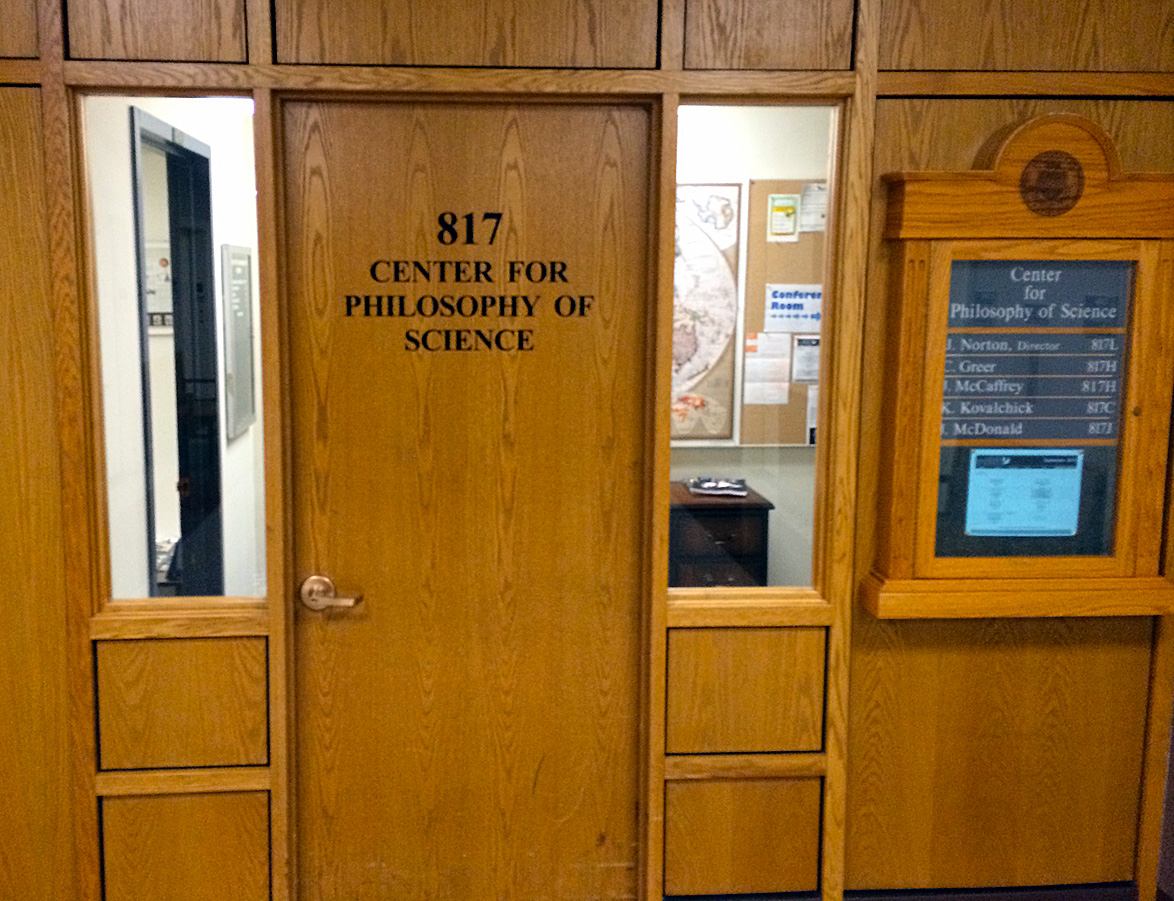
Home of the University of Pittsburgh's Center for Philosophy of Science when it was located on the eighth floor of the Cathedral of Learning (now located on 11)

Throughout its history, the center has been associated with a number of notable individuals from philosophy of science, including nearly 300 visiting professors from more than 30 countries. The center's inaugural Annual Lecture Series included lectures from the noted philosophers Paul K. Feyerabend, Adolf Grünbaum, Carl Gustav Hempel, Ernest Nagel, Michael Scriven, and Wilfrid Sellars. Later Annual Lecture Series participants include Herbert Feigl, Norwood Russell Hanson, Philip Morrison, Hilary Putnam, and George Wald. Nobel Prize–winning economist Alvin E. Roth once served as a fellow in the center.

== Associated people ==
- Alan Ross Anderson
- Robert Brandom
- John Earman Associate Director (1 July 1988 – 31 Aug 1997); Interim Director (1 Sept 2005 – 31 Dec 2005)
- Adolf Grünbaum Director (1 Sept 1960 – 30 June 1978)
- James G. Lennox Director (1 Sept 1997 – 31 Aug 2005)
- John D. Norton Director (1 Jan 2006 – 31 Aug 2016)
- Sandra Mitchell
- Nicholas Rescher Associate Director (1 Sept 1961 – 31 Aug 1981); Director (1 Sep 1981 – 31 Aug 1988)
- Alvin E. Roth Fellow; Awarded the Nobel Memorial Prize in Economic Sciences (2012)
- Wilfrid Sellars

== See also ==
- Pittsburgh school
