= Simari =

Simari is an Italian surname which is most prevalent in the southeastern region of Calabria and is also to be found among the American and especially Argentinian Italian diaspora. Notable people with the surname include:

- Cristian Javier Simari Birkner (born 1980), Argentinian alpine skier
- Guillermo Simari, Argentine computer scientist
- László Simari, Hungarian sprint canoer
- Leopoldo Simari (1889–1941), Argentinian actor
- Macarena Simari Birkner (born 1984), Argentinian alpine skier
- María Belén Simari Birkner (born 1982), Argentinian alpine skier
- Tomás Simari (1897–1981), Argentinian actor
