= Lottery paradox =

Paradox about the perception of probability

The lottery paradox arises from Henry E. Kyburg Jr. considering a fair 1,000-ticket lottery that has exactly one winning ticket. If that much is known about the execution of the lottery, it is then rational to accept that some ticket will win.

Suppose that an event is considered "very likely" only if the probability of it occurring is greater than 0.99. On those grounds, it is presumed to be rational to accept the proposition that ticket 1 of the lottery will not win. Since the lottery is fair, it is rational to accept that ticket 2 will not win either. Indeed, it is rational to accept for any individual ticket i of the lottery that ticket i will not win. However, accepting that ticket 1 will not win, accepting that ticket 2 will not win, and so on until accepting that ticket 1,000 will not win entails that it is rational to accept that no ticket will win, which entails that it is rational to accept the contradictory proposition that one ticket wins and no ticket wins.

The lottery paradox was designed to demonstrate that three attractive principles governing rational acceptance lead to contradiction:

- It is rational to accept a proposition that is very likely true.
- It is irrational to accept a proposition that is known to be inconsistent and is jointly inconsistent.
- If it is rational to accept a proposition A and it is rational to accept another proposition A', it is rational to accept A and A'.

The paradox remains of continuing interest because it raises several issues at the foundations of knowledge representation and uncertain reasoning: the relationships between fallibility, corrigible belief and logical consequence; the roles that consistency, statistical evidence and probability play in belief fixation; the precise normative force that logical and probabilistic consistency have on rational belief.

== History ==
Although the first published statement of the lottery paradox appears in Kyburg's 1961 Probability and the Logic of Rational Belief, the first formulation of the paradox appears in his "Probability and Randomness", a paper delivered at the 1959 meeting of the Association for Symbolic Logic, and the 1960 International Congress for the History and Philosophy of Science, but published in the journal Theoria in 1963. This paper is reprinted in Kyburg (1987).

== Short guide to the literature ==
The lottery paradox has become a central topic within epistemology. Kyburg proposed the thought experiment to get across a feature of his innovative ideas on probability (Kyburg 1961, Kyburg and Teng 2001), which are built around taking the first two principles above seriously and rejecting the last. For Kyburg, the lottery paradox is not really a paradox: his solution is to restrict aggregation.

Even so, for orthodox probabilists the second and third principles are primary, so the first principle is rejected. Here too one will see claims that there is really no paradox but an error: the solution is to reject the first principle, and with it the idea of rational acceptance. For anyone with basic knowledge of probability, the first principle should be rejected: for a very likely event, the rational belief about that event is just that it is very likely, not that it is true.

Most of the literature in epistemology approaches the puzzle from the orthodox point of view and grapples with the particular consequences faced by doing so, which is why the lottery is associated with discussions of skepticism (e.g., Klein 1981), and conditions for asserting knowledge claims (e.g., J. P. Hawthorne 2004). It is common to also find proposed resolutions to the puzzle that turn on particular features of the lottery thought experiment (e.g., Pollock 1986), which then invites comparisons of the lottery to other epistemic paradoxes, such as David Makinson's preface paradox, and to "lotteries" having a different structure. This strategy is addressed in (Kyburg 1997) and also in (Wheeler 2007), which includes an extensive bibliography.

Philosophical logicians and AI researchers have tended to be interested in reconciling weakened versions of the three principles, and there are many ways to do this, including Jim Hawthorne and Luc Bovens's (1999) logic of belief, Gregory Wheeler's (2006) use of 1-monotone capacities, Bryson Brown's (1999) application of preservationist para-consistent logics, Igor Douven and Timothy Williamson's (2006) appeal to cumulative non-monotonic logics, Horacio Arlo-Costa's (2007) use of minimal model (classical) modal logics, and Joe Halpern's (2003) use of first-order probability.

Finally, philosophers of science, decision scientists, and statisticians are inclined to see the lottery paradox as an early example of the complications one faces in constructing principled methods for aggregating uncertain information, which is now a discipline of its own, with a dedicated journal, Information Fusion, in addition to continuous contributions to general area journals.

== See also ==
- List of paradoxes
