= Allan Gotthelf =

American philosopher

- Born: December 30, 1942; Brooklyn, New York, United States
- Died: August 30, 2013 (aged 70); Philadelphia, Pennsylvania, United States

Education
- Education: Brooklyn College (BS); Pennsylvania State University (MA); Columbia University (MPhil, PhD)
- Thesis: Aristotle’s Conception of Final Causality (1975)

Philosophical work
- Era: Contemporary philosophy
- Region: Western Philosophy
- School: Objectivism
- Main interests: Aristotle, Teleology, Ayn Rand, Objectivism
- Notable works: On Ayn Rand; A Companion to Ayn Rand

Allan Stanley Gotthelf (December 30, 1942 – August 30, 2013) was an American philosopher. He was a scholar of the philosophies of both Aristotle and Ayn Rand.

== Academic career ==
Allan Stanley Gotthelf was born in Brooklyn, New York on December 30, 1942. He received a Bachelor of Science in mathematics from Brooklyn College in 1963 and a Master of Arts in mathematics from Pennsylvania State University in 1964. He then received a Master of Philosophy and Doctor of Philosophy in philosophy from Columbia University in 1972 and 1975, respectively, where he studied under professors such as Aristotelian scholar John Herman Randall, Jr. An essay based on his doctoral dissertation (both titled Aristotle's Conception of Final Causality) won first prize in the Dissertation Essay Competition of The Review of Metaphysics and was published in that journal in December 1976. He began his teaching career at Wesleyan University in Connecticut.

He was an emeritus professor of philosophy at The College of New Jersey, a life member of Clare Hall, Cambridge University, and visiting professor of the history and philosophy of science at the University of Pittsburgh, where he held the university's Fellowship for the Study of Objectivism from 2003 to 2012. He was one of the founders of the Ayn Rand Society (founded in 1987), affiliated with the American Philosophical Association, Eastern Division, and held the position of secretary of the Society and chairman of its steering committee from 1990 until his death.

Gotthelf published many articles and reviews in ancient philosophy and science, especially on the philosophical significance of Aristotle's scientific methodology and biology.

In the 1980s, he co-organized numerous international conferences on Aristotle's biological and philosophical thought, including the 1988 National Endowment for the Humanities Summer Institute on Aristotle's Metaphysics, Biology, and Ethics (with Michael Frede and John Cooper). He edited the Festschrift in honor of David M. Balme, Aristotle on Nature and Living Things and co-edited (with James G. Lennox) Philosophical Issues in Aristotle's Biology (Cambridge University Press, 1987). Gotthelf prepared for publication D. M. Balme's posthumous editions of Aristotle's History of Animals (HA): (a) the Loeb edition of Books VII–X (Harvard University Press, 1991) and (b) the Cambridge Classical Texts and Commentaries edition of the whole of HA (Cambridge University Press, vol. 1: 2002, vol. 2: forthcoming).

Gotthelf received many honors for his work on Aristotle, including in 2004 an international conference on "Aristotle on Being, Nature, and Life", held "in celebration of his contributions to the study of classical philosophy and science"; a volume of the proceedings, Being, Nature, and Life in Aristotle: Essays in Honor of Allan Gotthelf, edited by James G. Lennox and Robert Bolton, was published by Cambridge University Press in 2010. A volume of Gotthelf's collected Aristotle papers (including four papers previously unpublished), Teleology, First Principles, and Scientific Method in Aristotle's Biology, was published by Oxford University Press in their Oxford Aristotle Studies series in early 2012.

At the University of Pittsburgh, he taught graduate courses on Aristotle and organized various workshops and conferences on the nature of concepts and objectivity and the bearing of these issues on important topics in epistemology, philosophy of science, and metaethics, including those on Aristotle and Ayn Rand's epistemology. (See also, in the next section below, his role as editor of the Ayn Rand Society Philosophical Studies series.)

He joined the department of philosophy at Rutgers University as the Anthem Foundation Distinguished Fellow in the fall of 2012, where he taught until his death from cancer on August 30, 2013.

== Involvement with Ayn Rand and the Objectivist movement ==
Gotthelf was introduced to Ayn Rand's thought in 1961 when, at the age of 18, he first read Atlas Shrugged. He attended many lecture courses and question periods at the Nathaniel Branden Institute, where he worked as an usher (and in other capacities); in 1962, he first met Ayn Rand at the Institute. For over 15 years, he had many opportunities for sustained philosophical discussion with Rand; for instance, he was an active participant in Rand's famous 1969–71 Workshops on Introduction to Objectivist Epistemology, and subsequent smaller workshops at Rand's apartment. He was Rand's choice for indexer of her collections, The Virtue of Selfishness and Capitalism: the Unknown Ideal. As an undergraduate at Brooklyn College in 1963, Gotthelf founded one of the early college-based "Ayn Rand Clubs," under whose auspices Rand herself lectured to an audience of over 1,000. It was suggestions from both Gotthelf and Leonard Peikoff which motivated Rand to write her extended monograph on concepts, Introduction to Objectivist Epistemology.

Starting in 1964, he spoke on Rand's philosophy, Objectivism, countless times at colleges, universities, and private groups throughout the United States, Canada, Bermuda, Europe, and Japan. He is the author of On Ayn Rand, still the best-selling book in the Wadsworth Philosophers series; he also co-authored (with Gregory Salmieri) the entry on Rand in the Dictionary of Modern American Philosophers. He was co-editor (also with Salmieri) of A Companion to Ayn Rand, and published two essays in Robert Mayhew's Essays on Ayn Rand's Atlas Shrugged: "Galt's Speech in Five Sentences (and Forty Questions)" and "A Note on Dagny's 'Final Choice'."

As mentioned above, Gotthelf was one of the founding members of The Ayn Rand Society, and held its highest office. At the time of his death, he was the editor (with James G. Lennox as associate editor) of the series, Ayn Rand Society Philosophical Studies, published by the University of Pittsburgh Press. The first volume, Metaethics, Egoism, and Virtue: Studies in Ayn Rand's Normative Theory, was published in early 2011. The second volume, Concepts and Their Role in Knowledge: Reflections on Objectivist Epistemology, was published in 2013. The first volume includes his essay "The Choice to Value (1990)"; the second volume leads off with his essay "Ayn Rand's Theory of Concepts: Rethinking Abstraction and Essence."

== Allan Gotthelf Prize ==
The Allan Gotthelf Prize, established by the Classical Studies Faculty at The College of New Jersey upon Gotthelf's retirement, is awarded annually to an outstanding graduating senior for his or her work in the Classical Studies program. The winner of the endowed prize is announced at the departmental graduation ceremony and is recognized on a permanent plaque.

== Bibliography ==
- Aristotle on Nature and Living Things: Philosophical and Historical Studies ASIN 0935225005
- Philosophical Issues in Aristotle's Biology ISBN 978-0-521-32582-0
- Aristotle's De Partibus Animalium I and De Generatione Animalium ISBN 978-0-19-875128-1
- On Ayn Rand 978-0-53-457625-7
- Being, Nature, and Life in Aristotle: Essays in Honor of Allan Gotthelf ISBN 978-0-521-76844-3
- Metaethics, Egoism, and Virtue: Studies in Ayn Rand's Normative Theory, edit. with James G. Lennox, University of Pittsburgh Press, 2010, ISBN 978-0-8229-4400-3
- Teleology, First Principles, and Scientific Method in Aristotle's Biology, Oxford Aristotle Studies, Oxford University Press, 2012, ISBN 978-0-19-928795-6
- Concepts and Their Role in Knowledge: Reflections on Objectivist Epistemology (Ayn Rand Society Philosophical Studies), edit. with James G. Lennox, University of Pittsburgh Press, 2013, ISBN 978-0822944249
- A Companion to Ayn Rand, edit. with Gregory Salmieri, Wiley, 2016, ISBN 978-1405186841

== See also ==
- American philosophy
- Aristotle
- Ayn Rand
- List of American philosophers
