= Sidney R. Nagel =

- Education: Columbia University; Princeton University
- Awards: Klopsteg Memorial Award (1998); Oliver E. Buckley Condensed Matter Prize (1999)
- Scientific career
- Fields: Physics
- Workplaces: University of Chicago; Brown University
- Thesis: Infrared properties of metals and wavevector dependent local field effects (1974)
- Doctoral advisor: Stephen E. Schnatterly
- Doctoral students: Lynda Busse

Sidney Robert Nagel is an American physicist and the Stein-Freiler Distinguished Service Professor at the University of Chicago, where he is affiliated with the Department of Physics, the James Franck Institute, and the Enrico Fermi Institute. His research focuses on complex everyday physics such as "the anomalous flow of granular material, the long messy tendrils left by honey spooned from one dish to another, the pesky rings deposited by spilled coffee on a table after the liquid evaporates or the common splash of a drop of liquid onto a countertop." His work includes high-speed photography of splashing liquids and drop formation.

Nagel was born September 28, 1948, in New York, the son of Ernest Nagel and brother of mathematician Alexander Nagel. His academic career began as a research associate at Brown University in 1974, and from there he went in 1976 to the University of Chicago, becoming a full professor in 1984, and gaining his present position in 2001.

== Education ==
Nagel graduated with a B.A. from Columbia University in 1969. He then received a Ph.D. in physics from Princeton University in 1975 after completing a doctoral dissertation, titled "Infrared properties of metals and wavevector dependent local field effects", under the supervision of Stephen E. Schnatterly.

== Honors ==
- Alfred P. Sloan Foundation Fellow, 1979–81
- Fellow, American Physical Society, 1988
- Fellow, American Association for the Advancement of Science, 1993
- Quantrell Award for Excellence in Undergraduate Teaching, 1996
- American Academy of Arts and Sciences, 1997
- Louis Block Professor, 1998
- Klopsteg Memorial Award, American Association of Physics Teachers, 1998
- Oliver E. Buckley Condensed Matter Prize, American Physical Society, 1999
- Stein-Freiler Distinguished Service Professor, 2001
- Member, National Academy of Sciences, 2003
- Member, American Philosophical Society, 2020
- APS Medal, American Physical Society, 2023

== Publications ==
Some 26 papers are available via Cornell University Library.

== See also ==
- Granular convection
- Jamming (physics)
- National Academy of Sciences
