= Alexander Nagel =

American mathematician

Alexander Joseph Nagel (born 13 September 1945 in New York City) is an American mathematician, specializing in harmonic analysis, functions of several complex variables, and linear partial differential equations.

== Biography ==
He received in 1966 from Harvard University his bachelor's degree and in 1971 from Columbia University his PhD under the supervision of Lipman Bers with thesis Sheaves of Holomorphic Functions with Boundary Conditions and Sheaf Cohomology in Banach Algebras. At the University of Wisconsin, Madison, Nagel was from 1970 to 1972 an instructor, from 1972 to 1974 an assistant professor, from 1974 to 1977 an associate professor, and from 1977 to 2012 a full professor, retiring in December 2012 as professor emeritus. He was chair of the mathematics department in 1991–1993 and in 2011–2012, and Associate Dean for Natural Sciences in the College of Letters and Science in 1993–1998.

He was a Guggenheim Fellow for the academic year 1987–1988. He shared with Stephen Wainger the Stefan Bergman Prize for 2007–2008. Nagel was elected a Fellow of the American Association for the Advancement of Science in 2009 and a Fellow of the American Mathematical Society in 2012.

He wrote a series of major papers on fundamental operators in complex analysis, in particular on the question of how the geometry of the underlying domains relates to concrete estimates of the kernels. A deep paper by Nagel, Stein and Wainger with the unassuming title "Balls and metrics defined by vector fields: Basic properties" had tremendous impact on many branches of analysis and geometry. Alex was a major contributor to the theory of singular Radon transforms, in various stages of development. He is also well known for a fundamental estimate on Fourier transforms of surface carried measures and related applications.

Alexander Nagel, the elder son of the philosopher Ernest Nagel, is the brother of the physicist Sidney R. Nagel.

== Selected publications ==
=== Articles ===
- with Walter Rudin and Joel H. Shapiro: Nagel, Alexander; Rudin, Walter; Shapiro, Joel H. (1982). "Tangential boundary behavior of functions in Dirichlet-type spaces". Annals of Mathematics. 116 (2): 331–360. doi:10.2307/2007064. JSTOR 2007064.
- with Elias M. Stein and Stephen Wainger: Nagel, Alexander; Stein, Elias M.; Wainger, Stephen (1985). "Balls and metrics defined by vector fields I: Basic properties". Acta Mathematica. 155 (1): 103–147. doi:10.1007/BF02392539. S2CID 120388129.
- with Joaquim Bruna and S. Wainger: Bruna, Joaquim; Nagel, Alexander; Wainger, Stephen (1988). "Convex hypersurfaces and Fourier transforms". Annals of Mathematics. 127 (2): 333–365. doi:10.2307/2007057. JSTOR 2007057.
- with Jean-Pierre Rosay, E. M. Stein, and S. Wainger: Nagel, A.; Rosay, J. P.; Stein, E. M.; Wainger, S. (1989). "Estimates for the Bergman and Szegő kernels in $\mathbb{C}$^{2} ". Annals of Mathematics. 129 (1): 113–149. doi:10.2307/1971487. JSTOR 1971487.
- with Der-Chen Chang and E. M. Stein: "Estimates for the $\overline{\partial}$-Neumann problem in pseudoconvex domains of finite type in $\mathbb{C}$^{2} ". Acta Mathematica. 169 (1): 153–228. 1992. doi:10.1007/BF02392760.
- with Michael Christ, E. M. Stein, and S. Wainger: Christ, Michael; Nagel, Alexander; Stein, Elias M.; Wainger, Stephen (1999). "Singular and maximal Radon transforms: analysis and geometry" (PDF). Annals of Mathematics. Second Series. 150 (2): 489–578. arXiv:math/9909193. Bibcode:1999math......9193C. doi:10.2307/121088. JSTOR 121088. S2CID 119125832.

=== Books ===
- with E. M. Stein: Lectures on pseudo-differential operators: Regularity Theorems and applications to non-elliptic problems. Princeton University Press. 1979. ISBN 9781400870486.
