= Cailin O'Connor =

American philosopher

Cailin O'Connor is an American philosopher. She is Chancellor's Professor in the department of Logic and Philosophy of Science at University of California, Irvine.

She is married to philosopher James Owen Weatherall.

== Books ==
- The Misinformation Age: How False Beliefs Spread with James Owen Weatherall (Yale University Press, 2019)
- The Origins of Unfairness (Oxford University Press, 2019)
- Games in the Philosophy of Biology (Cambridge University Press, 2020)
- Modeling Scientific Communities (Cambridge University Press, 2024)

== Irish Dance ==
O'Connor is a competitive Irish Step Dancer. She was the 2024 and 2025 Western Region Champion over 40 at the Western US Regional Oireachtas in Phoenix, AZ, and was second in the Adult Champion division of the 2025 North American Irish Dance Championships.
