= Lynda Busse =

American physicist

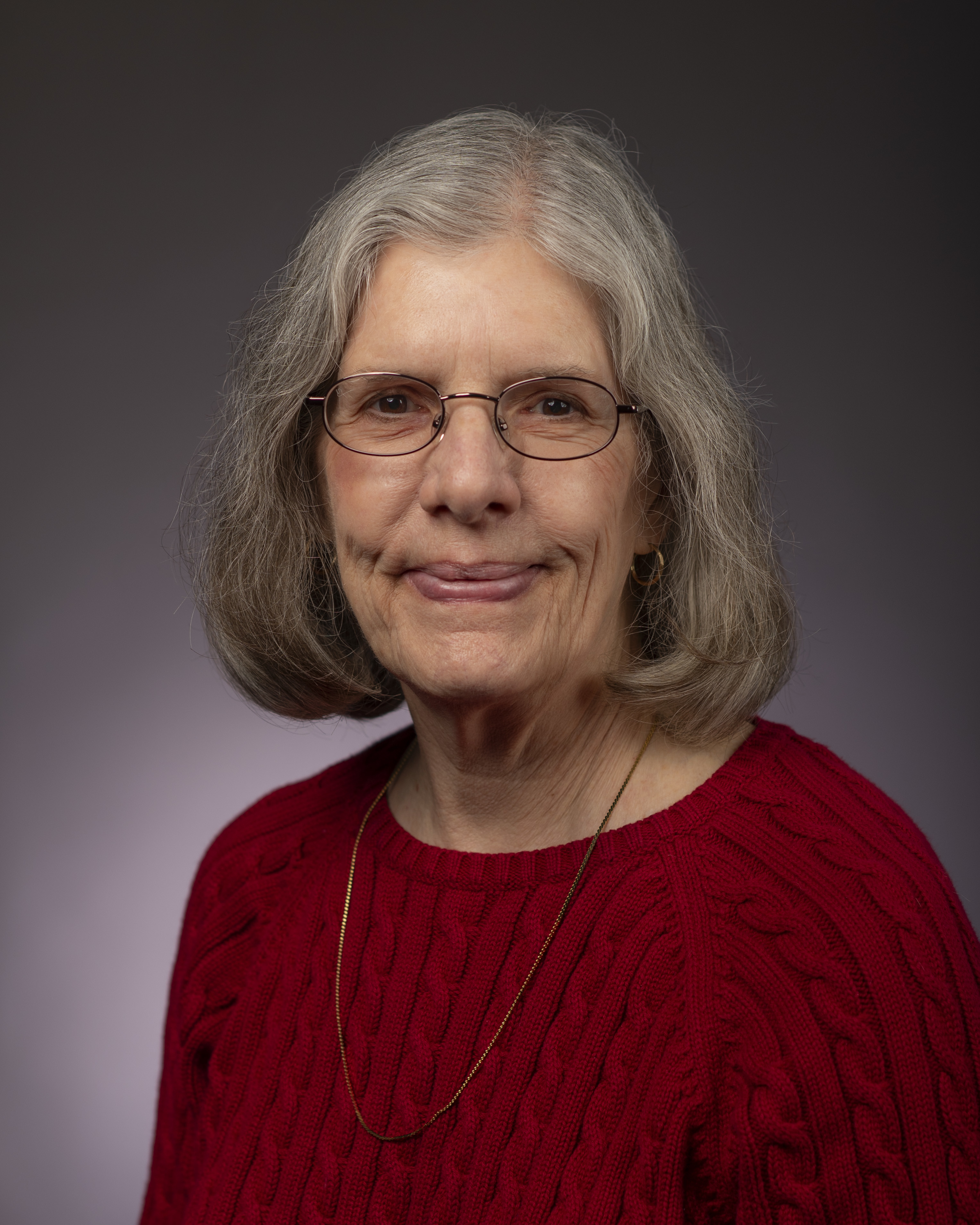

Lynda Elizabeth Busse is an American physicist specializing in the development, properties, and applications of optical glass, especially chalcogenide glass for transmission of infrared light over fiber optics. She is a research physicist in the Optical Materials and Devices Branch of the United States Naval Research Laboratory.

Busse completed a Ph.D. in physics in 1983, at the University of Chicago, under the supervision of Sidney R. Nagel. She joined the Naval Research Laboratory as a postdoctoral researcher, and continued there as a permanent staff researcher beginning in 1986.

She was elected as a Fellow of SPIE in 2024.
