= Preface paradox =

Paradox introduced by David Makinson

The preface paradox, or the paradox of the preface, was introduced by David Makinson in 1965. Similar to the lottery paradox, it presents an argument according to which it can be rational to accept mutually incompatible beliefs. While the preface paradox nullifies a claim contrary to one's belief, it is opposite to Moore's paradox which asserts a claim contrary to one's belief.

== Overview ==
The argument runs along these lines:

It is customary for authors of academic books to include in the preface of their books statements such as "any errors that remain are my sole responsibility." Occasionally they go further and actually claim there are errors in the books, with statements such as "the errors that are found herein are mine alone."

(1) Such an author has written a book that contains many assertions, and has factually checked each one carefully, submitted it to reviewers for comment, etc. Thus, they have reason to believe that each assertion they have made is true.

(2) However, they know, having learned from experience, that, despite their best efforts, there are very likely undetected errors in their book. So they also have good reason to believe that there is at least one assertion in their book that is not true.

Thus, they have good reason, from (1), to rationally believe that each statement in their book is true, while at the same time they have good reason, from (2), to rationally believe that the book contains at least one error. Thus they can rationally believe that the book both does and does not contain at least one error.

== Attempted solutions ==
In classical deductive logic, a set of statements is inconsistent if it contains a contradiction. The paradox then arises from the contradiction of the author's belief that all of the statements in his book are correct (1) with his belief that at least one of them is not correct (2). To resolve the paradox, one can attack either the contradiction between statements (1) and (2), or the inconsistency of their conjunction.

Probabilistic perspective may restate the statements in other terms, thus resolving the paradox by making them non-contradictory. Even if the author is 99% sure each single statement in his book is true (1), there can still be so many statements in the book that the aggregate probability of some of them being false (2) is very high as well. Since the principles of rational acceptance allows the author to accept a very likely statement as true, he may rationally choose to believe in (1). Same principles may make him rationally believe also in (2).

Another way to resolve the paradox is to reject the inconsistency of both (1) and (2) being true at the same time. This is done by rejecting the conjunction principle, i.e., that belief (or rational belief) in various propositions entails a belief (or rational belief) in their conjunction. Most philosophers intuitively believe the principle to be true, but some (e.g., Kyburg) intuitively believe it to be false. This is similar to Kyburg's solution to the lottery paradox.

Finally, paraconsistent logics aims to accept some contradictory statements without exploding.
