= Adolf Grünbaum =

Philosopher

- Born: May 15, 1923; Cologne, Prussia
- Died: November 15, 2018 (aged 95); Pittsburgh, Pennsylvania, U.S.

Education
- Education: Wesleyan University (BA); Yale University (PhD)
- Thesis: The Philosophy of Continuity: A Philosophical Interpretation of the Metrical Continuum of Physical Events in the Light of Contemporary Mathematical Conceptions (1951)
- Doctoral advisors: Carl Gustav Hempel

Philosophical work
- Era: Contemporary philosophy
- Region: Western philosophy
- School: Analytic; Logical empiricism
- Institutions: University of Pittsburgh
- Doctoral students: Bas van Fraassen
- Main interests: Philosophy of science, philosophy of physics, philosophy of psychoanalysis
- Notable ideas: Mind-dependence of temporal becoming

Adolf Grünbaum (/ˈɡruːnbɔːm/; German: [ˈɡʁyːnbaʊm]; May 15, 1923 – November 15, 2018) was a German-American philosopher of science and a critic of both psychoanalysis and Karl Popper's philosophy of science. He was the first Andrew Mellon Professor of Philosophy at the University of Pittsburgh from 1960 until his death, and also served as co-chairman of its Center for Philosophy of Science (from 1978), research professor of psychiatry (from 1979), and primary research professor in the department of history and philosophy of science (from 2006). His works include Philosophical Problems of Space and Time (1963), The Foundations of Psychoanalysis (1984), and Validation in the Clinical Theory of Psychoanalysis (1993).

== Life and career ==
Being Jewish, Adolf Grünbaum's family left Nazi Germany in 1938 and emigrated to the United States. Grünbaum received a B.A. with high distinction in philosophy and mathematics from Wesleyan University, Middletown, Connecticut, in 1943.

During the Second World War, Grünbaum was trained at Camp Ritchie, Maryland, and thus was one of the Ritchie Boys. He was stationed in Berlin and interrogated highly placed Nazis, returning to the United States in 1946.

Grünbaum obtained both his M.S. in physics (1948) and his PhD in philosophy (1951) from Yale University. He was a chaired professor of philosophy at Lehigh University, Bethlehem, Pennsylvania (1956–1960), after rising through the ranks there, starting in 1950, becoming a full professor in 1955.

In the fall of 1960, Grünbaum left Lehigh University to join the faculty of the University of Pittsburgh, where he became the first Andrew Mellon Professor of Philosophy. In that year, he also became the founding director of that University's Center for Philosophy of Science, serving as director until 1978. He and the colleagues he recruited then built world-class philosophy and history and philosophy of science departments at the university. Several of these colleagues had come from Yale University's philosophy department, starting in 1962. During this recruitment period the University of Pittsburgh appointed Nicholas Rescher, Wilfrid Sellars, Richard Gale, Nuel Belnap, Alan Ross Anderson, and Gerald Massey, among others.

Grünbaum served as president of both the American Philosophical Association (Eastern Division) and the Philosophy of Science Association (two terms). He was the director of the Center for Philosophy of Science from 1960 to 1978. He was the president of the Division of Logic, Methodology and Philosophy of Science of the International Union of History and Philosophy of Science (IUHPS) in 2004–2005 and then automatically became president of the IUHPS from 2006 to 2007. He was also a Fellow of the American Academy of Arts and Sciences.

He received the Senior U.S. Scientist Prize from the Alexander von Humboldt Foundation (Germany, 1985), the Fregene Prize for science from the Italian Parliament (1998) and the Wilbur Lucius Cross Medal for outstanding achievement from Yale University (1990). Also, in May 1995, he received an honorary doctorate from the University of Konstanz in Germany. In 2013, he received an honorary doctorate of philosophy from the University of Cologne and the Großes Bundesverdienstkreuz from the Federal Republic of Germany.

In April 2013 Grünbaum resigned from the department of philosophy at the University of Pittsburgh, while retaining his lifetime tenured Mellon Chair and all of his other affiliations at that university.

He died in November 2018 at the age of 95.

== Philosophical work ==
Grünbaum was the author of nearly 400 articles and book chapters as well as books on space-time and the critique of psychoanalysis. He is often viewed as part of the American brand of logical empiricism, associated especially with Hans Reichenbach.

Grünbaum did not embrace the prevailing — especially among physical scientists — Popperian philosophy of science, leading to some notoriety in the 1960s after he was ridiculed in print by the physicist Richard Feynman. A much-quoted exchange followed Grünbaum's neo-Leibnizian suggestion that the flow of time might be an illusion only in conscious entities, in which Feynman asked whether dogs, then cockroaches, were sufficiently conscious entities. Reportedly as a mark of further disdain, Feynman refused to let his name be printed, becoming instead the easily recognizable "Mr. X".

Some 40 years later, writer Jim Holt would characterize Grünbaum as, in the 1950s, "the foremost thinker about the subtleties of space and time," and as, by the 2000s, "arguably the greatest living philosopher of science." Holt portrays a rationalist Grünbaum who rejects any hint of mysteriousness in the cosmos (a "great rejector").

== Selected publications ==
- Modern Science and Zeno's Paradoxes (first edition, 1967; second edition, 1968)
- Geometry and Chronometry in Philosophical Perspective (1968)
- Philosophical Problems of Space and Time (first edition, 1963; second edition, 1973)
- The Foundations of Psychoanalysis (1984)
- Validation in the Clinical Theory of Psychoanalysis: A Study in the Philosophy of Psychoanalysis (1993)
- Collected Works,
  - Volume 1 (ed. by Thomas Kupka): Scientific Rationality, the Human Condition, and 20th Century Cosmologies, Oxford University Press 2013.
  - Volume 2: The Philosophy of Space & Time (ed. by Thomas Kupka), forthcoming
  - Volume 3: Lectures on Psychoanalysis (ed. by Thomas Kupka & Leanne Longwill), forthcoming.

For more complete publication details see the Full Bibliography of Prof. Adolf Grünbaum (2017).

== Festschriften ==
Three celebratory books ("Festschrift" volumes) dealing with his work have been published to date:

- (1983) Physics, Philosophy and Psychoanalysis: Essays in Honor of Adolf Grünbaum. R.S. Cohen and L. Lauden (eds.). Dordrecht, The Netherlands: D. Reidel Publishing Co.
- (1993) Philosophical Problems of the Internal and External Worlds: Essays on the Philosophy of Adolf Grünbaum. J. Earman, A.I. Janis, G.J. Massey, and N. Rescher (eds.). Pittsburgh, PA/Konstanz, Germany: University of Pittsburgh Press/University of Konstanz Press.
- (2009) Philosophy of Religion, Physics, and Psychology: Essays in Honor of Adolf Grünbaum. Proceedings of the international conference, "The Adolf Grünbaum Symposium in Honor of the Works of Professor Adolf Grünbaum," Santa Barbara, CA, October 2002. Amherst, NY: Prometheus Books.
