= Mary-Anne Williams =

Australian professor at UNSW founded Artificial Intelligence programs

- Born: Sydney, Australia
- Education: University of Sydney; Stanford University; University of Oxford; Harvard University; University of Edinburgh
- Awards: AAAI Fellow Association for the Advancement of Artificial Intelligence; ATSE Fellow Australian Academy of Technological Science and Engineering; ACS Fellow Australian Computer Association; Australasian Artificial Intelligence Distinguished Research Contribution Award 2019; Google Faculty Award 2019-2020 and 2021-2022; Pauli Fellowship 2008; IBM Faculty Award 2007; #16 on 365 Women in STEM; Australasian Distinguished Doctoral Dissertation Award 1995.
- Scientific career
- Fields: Innovation, Artificial Intelligence (AI), AI Safety, Human-AI Collaboration, Explainable AI (XAI), Strategic Management, Business AI, Human-AI Interaction, Legal and Ethical Implications of AI
- Workplaces: UNSW Sydney and Stanford University
- Doctoral advisor: Norman Foo

Mary-Anne Williams is an Australian researcher who is the Michael J Crouch Chair for Innovation at the University of New South Wales (UNSW) in Sydney, Australia where she is based in the UNSW Business School. Her research focuses on AI and Innovation.

She is founder and director of the UNSW Business AI Lab and deputy director of the UNSW AI Institute. Williams serves on the Defence Trailblazer Advisory Board and the Australian SKA Regional Centre (Square Kilometer Array Telescope) Board, and the Advisory Boards of Kit (a Commonwealth Bank business), CipherStash a startup, and several Journal Editorial boards.

Previously Williams was a Distinguished Research Professor at University of Technology Sydney and Director of the UTS Magic Lab.

Williams is an Artificial Intelligence researcher with expertise in Cognitive Science, Disruptive Technologies, Digital Transformation, Business and Law. She is listed among Robohub's "Top 25 Women in Robotics", and celebrated on the First International Day of Women and Girls in Science.

Williams is a Fellow of AAAI (the global body for Artificial Intelligence), a Fellow of the Australian Academy of Technological Sciences and Engineering (ATSE), a Fellow of the Australian Computer Society (FACS), Fellow and Affiliated Faculty at CODEX at Stanford University. She has served on numerous boards and advisory groups including KR Inc, the Innovation Reference Group with the South Western Sydney Local Area Health District, the Digital Transformation and the AI Preparedness Committees at ATSE, the ACM Eugene L. Lawler Award for Humanitarian Contributions within Computer Science and Informatics.

Williams was a speaker at the 2022 APAC Open Data Science Conference, 2021 ACM/IEEE International Conference on Human–Robot Interaction, 2020 Strategic Management Society Conference on Designing the Future at Berkeley, 2019 Academy of Marketing Science, United Nations WSIS Forum on the Impact of AI, 2016 World Science Festival, and Australian Strategic Policy Institute. She shared her views on the impact of AI on Human Rights during a panel at the Australian Human Rights Commission Technology Conference.

Williams focuses on Innovation and works on AI, Decision Making models, Human-AI collaboration, AI safety and law. She leads a partnership with the South Western Sydney Local Health District, the Softbank Social Robotics Partnership and the partnership with the Commonwealth Bank in Social Robotics. She discussed the impact of Artificial Intelligence on compassion and human rights with the Dalai Lama in Sydney in June 2018.

Williams has a PhD in Artificial Intelligence and a Master of Laws (LLM). She is co-founder of the AI Policy Hub. From 2003–2020 Professor Williams led the UTS RoboCup Team to become World Champions in Social Robotics 2019–2022. The team was the Australian Champion and Top International team in 2004. It won the Human–Robot Interface Award in 2017. In 2018 the RoboCup Team won the Tour Guide Challenge with the highest score of any team on any test in the history of the Social Robotics League. In 2019 her Research Team won the Social Robotics League at RoboCup 2019.

Williams has made foundational contributions to the field of Decision Making using insights, methods and techniques from belief revision.

She developed the first computational models and anytime algorithms for Belief Revision Operators to be applied to real-world problems.

== Publications ==
- "Australia’s unfair advantage in the new global wave of AI innovation", March 2023
- "A Robot With Unlimited Patience Has Been Assisting Visitors At A Sydney Hospital This Week", March 2020
- "Making a Social Impact, BBC", March 2020
- "The AI Race: Will Australia Lead or Lose, NSW Royal Society Journal, 2019"
- Robot Social Intelligence, International Conference on Social Robotics ICSR 2012: Social Robotics pp 45–55 Retrieved on 1 November 2017
- Decision-Theoretic Human–Robot Interaction: Designing Reasonable and Rational Robot Behaviour International Conference on Social Robotics
- ICSR 2016: Social Robotics pp 72–82 Retrieved 1 November 2017
- Technological Opacity, Predictability, and Self-Driving Cars "Cardozo Law Review, Vol. 38, 2016"
- "A social robot in a Shopping Center". smh.com.au. December 2016.
- An investigation of parametrized difference revision operators', Annals of Mathematics and Artificial Intelligence 2019, with Theofanis Aravanis and Pavlos Peppas.
- Full Characterization of Parikh's Relevance-Sensitive Axiom for Belief Revision, Journal of Artificial Intelligence Research 2019, with Theofanis Aravanis and Pavlos Peppas.
- Well-M³N: A Maximum-Margin Approach to Unsupervised Structured Prediction', IEEE Transactions on Emerging Topics in Computational Intelligence, 2019. with Abidi, S, Piccardi, M, Tsang, WH.
- The Essence of Ethical Reasoning in Robot-Emotion Processing International Journal of Social Robotics 10 (2), 211-223, 2018 with Suman Ojha and Benjamin Johnston.
- Evolving robot empathy towards humans with motor disabilities through artificial pain generations, Neuroscience 5 (1), 56-73, 2017 with Muh Anshar.
- "A social robot helping at check-in and at the gate, Sydney International Airport", August 2017
- " Field Work enabled by a unique Academic-Industry Partnership", August 2017

== See also ==
- Innovation
