= Kenneth F. Schaffner =

American historian (born 1939)

- Born: Kenneth Francis Schaffner; October 30, 1939 (age 86); New York City, U.S.
- Education: Brooklyn College; Columbia University; University of Pittsburgh School of Medicine
- Spouse: Jeanette K. Schaffner
- Children: Gabrielle Schaffner
- Awards: Guggenheim Fellowship (1972)
- Scientific career
- Fields: History of science Philosophy of science
- Workplaces: University of Pittsburgh
- Thesis: The Logic and Methodology of Reduction in the Physical and Biological Sciences (1967)
- Doctoral advisor: Ernest Nagel

Kenneth Francis Schaffner (born October 30, 1939) is an emeritus Distinguished University Professor, University Professor of Philosophy and Psychology, and Professor of Psychiatry at the University of Pittsburgh. He specializes in the history of science and the philosophy of science.

== Education ==
His formal education consists of:

- BS, Physics and Philosophy, Brooklyn College, 1961
- PhD, Philosophy, Columbia University, 1967
- MD, University of Pittsburgh, 1986

== Career ==
Schaffner is a philosopher and medical doctor who specializes in the history and philosophy of science. He has published extensively on ethical and conceptual issues, and has written several books in those fields. He is a Distinguished University Professor at the University of Pittsburgh, but has also taught since 1962 at Brooklyn College, the University of Chicago, the University of Maryland, and George Washington University, where he is a professor emeritus and was formerly University Professor of Medical Humanities and Professor of Philosophy. His recent work has been on ethical and philosophical issues in human behavior. He was editor-in-chief of the academic journal Philosophy of Science from 1975 to 1980.

== Honors ==
Schaffner was a Guggenheim Fellow and has received many academic honors, including:

- Fellow, American Association for the Advancement of Science, 1986
- Fellow, The Hastings Center, 1991
- Fellow, Association for the Advancement of Philosophy and Psychiatry, 1992

== Selected publications ==
Schaffner had been writing books for over forty years, and papers for over fifty. His books and some of his recent papers are listed below:

=== Books ===
- Nineteenth-Century Aether Theories, Oxford, Pergamon Press, 1972
- Logic of Discovery and Diagnosis in Medicine, K. Schaffner (ed.) Berkeley: University of California Press, 1985
- Medical Innovation and Bad Outcomes: Legal, Social, and Ethical Responses, M. Siegler, S. Toulmin, F. Zimring and K. Schaffner (eds.) Health Administration Press, Michigan, 1987
- Discovery and Explanation in Biology and Medicine, University of Chicago Press, 1993
- Behaving: What's Genetic, What's Not, and Why Should We Care, Oxford University Press, 2016

=== Chapters ===
- "Theories, Models, and Equations in Systems Biology", in F. Boogerd, et al. (eds) Towards a Philosophy of Systems Biology, Netherlands: Elsevier, 2007. Pages 145-162.
- Schaffner, K.F. (2008) "Etiological Models in Psychiatry: Reductive and Nonreductive" in K. Kendler and Josef Parnas (eds.) Baltimore: Johns Hopkins University Press. 2008. pp. 48–90.
- Schaffner, K.F. (2008) "A Tail of a Tiger, Comment: on Zachar's "Real Kinds but No True Taxonomy: An Essay in Psychiatric Systematics.," in K. Kendler and Josef Parnas (eds.) Baltimore: Johns Hopkins University Press. 2008. pp. 355–367.
- Schaffner, K.F. "Theories, Models, and Equations in Biology: The Heuristic Search for Emergent Simplifications in Neurobiology" Philosophy of Science, Proceedings of Vancouver Philosophy of Science Association biennial meeting, 2008. 75 (2008), 1008-1021.
- Schaffner, K.F. "Philosophy of Method," a revision of an earlier encyclopedia essay on "Method, Philosophy of," Encyclopedia of Microbiology, 3rd edition, M. Schaechter (ed.) Elsevier, 2009.
- "The validity of psychiatric diagnosis: Etiopathogenic and clinical approaches," in Psychiatric Diagnosis: Challenges and Prospects, I. Salloum and J. Mezzich (eds.) London: Wylie, 2009. pp. 221–232

=== Papers ===
- "Medical Informatics and the Concept of Disease", Theoretical Medicine and Bioethics 21: 85–101: 2000.
- "Behavior at the Organismal and Molecular Levels: The Case of C. elegans", Philosophy of Science 67 2000([PSA 1998] Proceedings): S273-S288.
- "Preventing severe mental illnesses--new prospects and ethical challenges", with Patrick D. McGorry. Schizophrenia Research Aug 1 2001; 51(1): 3–15.
- "Nature and Nurture" Current Opinion in Psychiatry, September, 2001: 14: 486–490.
- "Genes, Concepts, DST Implications, and the Possibility of Prototypes: Comments on Stotz and Griffiths, Burian, and Walters", History and Philosophy of the Life Sciences, 2004;26(1):81-90.
- "Reduction: The Cheshire Cat Problem and a Return to Roots", Synthese, Volume 151, Number 3 / August, 2006. Pages 377-402.
