= On Ayn Rand =

Book by Allan Gotthelf

- Cover of the first edition
- Author: Allan Gotthelf
- Language: English
- Series: Wadsworth Philosophers
- Subject: Ayn Rand
- Publisher: Wadsworth Publishing
- Publication date: 2000
- Media type: Print
- Pages: 104
- ISBN: 978-0-534-57625-7
- OCLC: 43668181

On Ayn Rand is a book about the life and thought of the 20th-century philosopher Ayn Rand by scholar Allan Gotthelf. It was published in early 2000 by Wadsworth Publishing (now part of Cengage Learning) in its Wadsworth Philosophers series.

== Reception ==
Objectivist scholar Tara Smith reviewed the work for the Review of Metaphysics and described it as "an admirably essentialized review" that "joins scholarly rigor with firsthand knowledge of Rand’s thought to provide a systematic introduction to Rand’s philosophy." Smith does find some of Gotthelf's explanations to be "slightly too abbreviated for the targeted audience" and finds his brief treatment of some topics to be "somewhat frustrating."

In a review in Teaching Philosophy, Irfan Khawaja says, "Gotthelf’s illuminating account of Rand’s epistemology offers an intriguing point of entry... as well as an object lesson on the relationship between epistemology and ethics... On Ayn Rand is a remarkable success... I can’t think of a piece of writing that better conveys both the systematicity and the grandeur of Rand’s thought than the last four pages of Gotthelf’s book." Rand enthusiast and accountancy scholar Edward W. Younkins also praised the work, calling it a "fine" but shorter version of Objectivist philosopher Leonard Peikoff's book about Rand's philosophy.

In a review, Rand scholar Chris Matthew Sciabarra welcomes the addition of another book to the literature about Rand, but criticizes Gotthelf for not addressing most other secondary works about Rand, in particular accusing him of "refusal to mention any non-orthodox works." Sciabarra says the book suffers from an "orthodox interpretation" of Rand's life and ideas, and also gives insufficient attention to her politics and aesthetics.

In a paper on the critical neglect of Rand's aesthetic philosophy, Michelle Marder Kamhi and Louis Torres criticized Gotthelf for spending a mere half a page of the book discussing the topic. Kamhi and Torres also criticised Gotthelf's statement that one's sense of life is directly dependent on philosophy (in contrast to Rand), and his uncritical acceptance of Rand's definition of romantic art in terms of the acceptance of man's free will.

== See also ==
- Bibliography of Ayn Rand and Objectivism
- Objectivist epistemology
