= Meaning postulate =

Postulate in formal semantics

In formal semantics and philosophy of language, a meaning postulate is a postulate used to express lexical relations between terms, in cases where such relations are not encoded in the compositional semantics of some formal language. The term was coined by Rudolf Carnap when he reformulated semantic definitions of terms as postulates in the object language of a system of logic, in order to explicate the concept of analyticity. Richard Montague made heavy use of meaning postulates in the development of Montague grammar, and they have subsequently featured prominently in formal semantics.

== Examples ==
A meaning postulate is a sentence that constrains the interpretation of predicates in a logical theory, expressed in the object language of the same.

Consider the two sentences, due to Carnap:

(1) Fido is black or Fido is not black.

(2) If Jack is a bachelor, then he is not married.

Both (1) and (2) are necessarily true, but they are so in different ways. To understand that "Fido is black or Fido is not black" is necessarily true, we need only understand under which conditions the logical connectives "or" and "not" are true. We do not need to know the meaning behind the terms "Fido" and "black". Indeed, they could be substituted for arbitrary terms salva veritate.

However, to understand that (2) is necessarily true, we must understand the meanings behind the terms "bachelor" and "unmarried". (2) is not necessarily true due to the rules of logic, but rather because "bachelor" means "unmarried man". In other words, (2) is analytically true, while (1) is logically true.

Carnap realised that one could express the meanings of terms in the object language of a logical system by constraining their possible interpretations. One could, for instance, stipulate that:

 (3) FOR ALL x: x is a bachelor IF AND ONLY IF x is unmarried AND x is a man.

(3) would then be a meaning postulate. It expresses a lexical relation between the terms "bachelor", "unmarried", and "man", such that the truth of a statement like "Jack is a bachelor" entails the truth of "he is unmarried".

== See also ==
- List of logic symbols
