= William Malisoff =

William Marias Malisoff, also William Marias Malisov (14 March 1895 – 16 November 1947), was born in Ekaterinoslav, Russia, now Dnipro Ukraine, immigrated to the United States as a child, and became a naturalized United States citizen. Malisoff obtained a BS in 1916, an MA in 1917 and CE in 1918 degrees from Columbia University and a PhD. from New York University in 1925. Malisoff was an associate professor of biochemistry and lecturer in philosophy at University of Pennsylvania from 1922 to 1934. From 1934 to 1942 he was associate professor of biochemistry at Brooklyn Polytechnic Institute. In 1938-1939 Malisoff was delegated NEC member of University Federation for Democracy and Intellectual Freedom. He owned and operated United Laboratories, Inc, a company principally engaged in research on lubricating processes for chemical products, war industries and biochemistry. In 1934 he founded the Philosophy of Science journal and served as its first editor until his death in 1947. From 1936 to 1942 he was a regular contributor on science and technology to the New York Times Book Review. Also Malisoff, with Niels Bohr, Bertrand Russell, Ernest Nagel et al sat on the Advisory Committee of the International Encyclopedia of Unified Science. In 1945 Malisoff was connected with the Institute for the Unity of Science for a short time. Chemical researcher Kapok-Milkweed project, United States Navy, 1944; Essex College of Medicine, Newark, New Jersey, 1945–1946; Director of research Longevity Research Foundation, New York, since 1946.

== Espionage claims ==
Malisoff fell under FBI scrutiny in 1940 on the basis of observed contact with KGB MGB? Officer Gaik Ovakimian who was also a doctorate chemistry student at New York University from 1939 to 1940. According to Venona project information, the Soviets, in 1944, were having considerable trouble with Malisoff as he wanted sizable funds to help him establish a manufacturing capacity at New York laboratory (Reisch, 107). When his request was flatly refused, Malisoff complained with considerable irritation "that the materials handed over by him on one question alone—oil, by his estimate had yielded the [Soviet] Union millions during past years and the aid requested by him was trifling." Malisoff was an extremely active and important agent; his Case Officer, Leonid Kvasnikov, who specialized in scientific-technical espionage, had met with Malisoff twenty times in 1943 alone. Malisoff had previously raised the funding question with Mikhail Shalyapin and Gaik Ovakimian who had preceded Kvasnikov.

In August 1943 Pavel Mikhailov, the New York Soviet Military Intelligence (GRU) Rezident sent an inquiry to Moscow regarding Malisoff. But the GRU "was forbidden to meet Malisov [Malisoff] since the latter is connected with the Neighbors [KGB]? (est. in 1954) or FBI. "

== Venona ==
William Marias Malisoff, whose cover name assigned by Soviet intelligence and deciphered by Arlington Hall cryptographers were HENRY and TALENT. Malisoff is identified in the following intercepted Venona project decrpytions:

195. Venona 1276 GRU New York to Moscow, 1943; 193 KGB New York to Moscow, 8 February 1944; 620 KGB New York to Moscow, 4 May 1944; 622 KGB New York to Moscow, 4 May 1944; 1077 KGB New York to Moscow, 29 July 1944; 1403 KGB New York to Moscow, 5 October 1944; 1680 KGB New York to Moscow, 30 November 1944; 1706 KGB New York to Moscow, 4 December 1944; 1755 KGB New York to Moscow, 14 December 1944.

== Writing by Malisoff ==
- Methane William Malisoff, Gustav Egloff J. Phys. Chem., 1918, 22 (8), pp 529–575
- A Calendar of Doubts and Faiths, 1930
- Philosophy of Science, editor.
- Meet the Sciences, 1932
- Determination of Mercaptans in Hydrocarbon Solvents: An Improvement of the Silver Nitrate Method
- The Span of Life, 1937
- The Dictionary of Biochemistry and related subjects (also editor-in-chief), 1943

== See also ==
- Otto Neurath
