= Ronald Loui =

American computer scientist

- Born: 1961; Honolulu, Hawaii, US
- Occupation: Adjunct Professor

Academic background
- Education: University of Rochester
- Thesis: Theory and Computation of Uncertain Reasoning and Decision (1987)
- Doctoral advisor: Henry E. Kyburg Jr.

Ronald Prescott Loui is an American computer scientist and adjunct professor of computer science at Case Western Reserve University. He previously taught at Washington University in St. Louis and University of Illinois Springfield.

== Biography ==
Loui grew up in Hawaii, where he was a classmate of Barack Obama at Punahou School. He went on to earn a bachelor's degree from Harvard University in applied mathematics in 1982, where his undergraduate thesis won an ACM award. He completed a Ph.D. advised by Henry E. Kyburg Jr., at the University of Rochester in 1987.

He was a postdoctoral researcher at Stanford University in 1987–1988, working there with Patrick Suppes and Amos Tversky, among others. From 1988 to 2008, he was a professor of computer science at Washington University in St. Louis in the McKelvey School of Engineering. He was also associated with multiple departments outside of engineering.

Loui has published papers on defeasible reasoning in artificial intelligence and he is a proponent of scripting languages. He is co-patent holder of a deep packet inspection hardware device that could read and edit the contents of packets as they stream through a network.
