= Philosophy of Science Association =

American learned society

The Philosophy of Science Association (PSA) is an international academic organization (founded in 1933 in the United States) that promotes research, teaching, and free discussion of issues in the philosophy of science from diverse standpoints. The PSA engages in activities such as the publishing of periodicals, essays and monographs in the field of the philosophy of science; holding biennial conferences; awarding of prizes for distinguished work in the field; supporting early-career scholars; and sponsoring in public engagement events.

== History ==
The PSA was founded in 1933 and incorporated in Michigan 1975. The administrative offices of the PSA have been located at the University of Cincinnati College of Arts and Sciences since 2021.

== Philosophy of Science ==
Philosophy of Science, the official journal of the Philosophy of Science Association (PSA), has been published continuously since 1934. Philosophy of Science publishes the best work in philosophy of science, broadly construed, five times a year. Every January, April, July, and October (the regular issues) the journal publishes articles, book reviews, discussion notes, and essay reviews; every December it publishes proceedings from the most recent Biennial Meeting of the Philosophy of Science Association.

== Biennial Conference ==
The PSA hosts a biennial conference in the fall with an attendance of around 700 scholars and other professionals from over 35 countries. The biennial meeting has grown significantly in recent years, from around 350 attendees in 2008 to close to 700 in 2018. The meeting provides an opportunity for scholars from around the world to present and get feedback on their work and to learn about the latest research in the field. The main program for the meeting consists of symposia, individual papers, and posters, as well as sessions sponsored by cognate societies. The meeting also provides opportunities to mentor and support early-career scholars, to award distinguished scholarship in the field, to hold a Public Forum about issues of broad public interest in the city where we are meeting, to engage in dialogue with scientists about philosophical issues, and to provide training opportunities for all scholars about such issues as applying for grants, publishing, and social engagement.

== Hempel Award ==
In 2012, it began presenting the Hempel Award, named for the eminent 20th-century philosopher of science Carl Gustav Hempel, for lifetime achievement in the philosophy of science. The first recipient was Bas van Fraassen. A full list of recipients can be viewed on the association's website.
