= Ernest Nagel =

American philosopher

- Nagel c. 1955
- Born: November 16, 1901; Vágújhely, Kingdom of Hungary, Austria-Hungary
- Died: September 20, 1985 (aged 83); New York City, U.S.
- Spouse: Edith Alexandria Haggstrom (m. 1935)
- Children: Alexander Nagel; Sidney R. Nagel

Education
- Education: CCNY (BSc, 1923); Columbia University (PhD, 1931)
- Academic advisors: Morris Raphael Cohen; John Dewey

Philosophical work
- Era: 20th-century philosophy
- Region: Western philosophy
- School: Analytic; Logical positivism
- Institutions: Columbia University
- Doctoral students: Arthur Pap; Henry E. Kyburg Jr. Isaac Levi; Morton White; Patrick Suppes
- Notable students: Arthur Danto
- Main interests: Philosophy of science
- Notable ideas: Reductionism in science

Ernest Nagel (/ˈneɪɡəl/; German: [ˈnaːɡl̩]; November 16, 1901 – September 20, 1985) was an American philosopher of science. Along with Rudolf Carnap, Hans Reichenbach, and Carl Hempel, he is sometimes seen as one of the major figures of the logical positivist movement. His 1961 book The Structure of Science is considered a foundational work in the logic of scientific explanation.

== Life and career ==
Nagel was born in Nové Mesto nad Váhom (now in Slovakia, then Vágújhely and part of the Austro-Hungarian Empire) to Jewish parents. His mother, Frida Weiss, was from the nearby town of Vrbové (or Verbo).

He emigrated to the United States at the age of 10 and became a U.S. citizen in 1919. He received a BSc from the City College of New York (CCNY) in 1923, and earned his PhD from Columbia University in 1931, with a dissertation titled On the Logic of Measurement.

Through the award of a Guggenheim Fellowship, he was able to spend a year in Europe (from August 1934 to July 1935) to learn about the new trends in philosophy on the continent.

Except for one year (1966–67) at Rockefeller University, Nagel spent his entire academic career at Columbia. He became the first John Dewey Professor of Philosophy there in 1955. And then University Professor from 1967 until his retirement in 1970, after which he continued to teach. In 1977, he was one of the few philosophers elected to the National Academy of Sciences.

His work concerned the philosophy of mathematical fields such as geometry and probability, quantum mechanics, and the status of reductive and inductive theories of science. His book The Structure of Science (1961) practically inaugurated the field of analytic philosophy of science. He expounded the different kinds of explanation in different fields, and was sceptical about attempts to unify the nature of scientific laws or explanations. He was the first to propose that by positing analytic equivalencies (or "bridge laws") between the terms of different sciences, one could eliminate all ontological commitments except those required by the most basic science. He also upheld the view that social sciences are scientific, and should adopt the same standards as natural sciences.

Nagel wrote An Introduction to Logic and the Scientific Method with Morris Raphael Cohen, his CCNY teacher in 1934. In 1958, he published with James R. Newman Gödel's proof, a short book explicating Gödel's incompleteness theorems to those not well trained in mathematical logic. He edited the Journal of Philosophy (1939–1956) and the Journal of Symbolic Logic (1940–1946).

As a public intellectual, he supported a skeptical approach to claims of the paranormal, becoming one of the first sponsors and fellows of the Committee for Skeptical Inquiry in 1976, along with 24 other notable philosophers like W. V. Quine. The committee posthumously inducted him into their "Pantheon of Skeptics" in recognition of Nagel's contributions to the cause of scientific skepticism. Nagel was an atheist.

Nagel was an elected member of the American Philosophical Society (1962) and the American Academy of Arts and Sciences (1981).

He died in New York City. He had two sons, Alexander Nagel (professor of mathematics at the University of Wisconsin) and Sidney Nagel (professor of physics at the University of Chicago).

Nagel's doctoral students include Morton White, Patrick Suppes, Henry Kyburg, Isaac Levi, and Kenneth Schaffner.

A festschrift, Philosophy, Science and Method: Essays in Honor of Ernest Nagel, was published in 1969.

== Select works ==
- On The Logic of Measurement (1930)
- An Introduction to Logic and Scientific Method (with M. R. Cohen, 1934)
- "The Formation of Modern Conceptions of Formal Logic in the Development of Geometry" (1939)
- Principles of the Theory of Probability (1939)
- "The Meaning of Reduction in the Natural Sciences" (1949)
- Sovereign Reason (1954)
- Logic without Metaphysics (1957)
- Nagel, Ernest; Newman, James R. (1958). Gödel's Proof. New York: New York University Press – via Internet Archive.
- The Structure of Science: Problems in the Logic of Scientific Explanation (1961, second ed. 1979)
- Nagel, Ernest; Brandt, Richard B. (1965). Meaning and knowledge : systematic readings in epistemology. New York: Harcourt, Brace & World.
- Observation and Theory in Science (with others, 1971)
- Teleology Revisited and Other Essays in the Philosophy and History of Science (1979)
