= Isaac Levi =

American philosopher (1930–2018)

- Born: June 30, 1930; New York City, U.S.
- Died: December 25, 2018 (aged 88)

Education
- Education: New York University (BA); Jewish Theological Seminary of America; Columbia University (MA, PhD)
- Doctoral advisor: Ernest Nagel

Philosophical work
- Era: Contemporary philosophy
- Region: Western philosophy
- School: Pragmatism
- Institutions: Columbia University
- Notable students: John Danaher
- Main interests: Epistemology, decision theory, philosophy of science
- Notable ideas: Belief revision, imprecise probability, Levi identity

Isaac Levi (June 30, 1930 – December 25, 2018) was an American philosopher who served as the John Dewey Professor of Philosophy at Columbia University. He is noted for his work in epistemology and decision theory.

== Education and career ==
Levi was one of several doctoral students of Ernest Nagel at Columbia University who were influential in American post-war philosophy; others were Morton White, Patrick Suppes, and Henry E. Kyburg, Jr. Levi taught at Case Western Reserve University before joining the Columbia faculty in 1970. He was elected in 1986 to the American Academy of Arts and Sciences.

Levi also served as doctoral advisor to prominent formal philosophers, including Horacio Arló-Costa and Teddy Seidenfeld, and acted as a mentor to Cheryl Misak during her year at Columbia. There was a debate between Kyburg and Levi on topics in what has come to be known as formal epistemology.

== Philosophical work ==
Levi first made a name for himself with his first book, Gambling with Truth. In the text Levi offered a decision theoretic reconstruction of epistemology with a close-eye towards the classical pragmatist philosophers like William James and Charles Sanders Peirce. Levi was known for his work in belief revision and imprecise probability.

== Major publications ==
=== Books ===
- Levi, Isaac (1973) [1967]. Gambling with truth: an essay on induction and the aims of science. Cambridge, Massachusetts: MIT Press. ISBN 9780262620260. Originally issued by Knopf (1967).
- Levi, Isaac (1980). The enterprise of knowledge: an essay on knowledge, credal probability, and chance. Cambridge, Massachusetts: MIT Press. ISBN 9780262620437.
- Levi, Isaac (1984). Decisions and revisions: philosophical essays on knowledge and value. Cambridge, Massachusetts: Cambridge University Press. ISBN 9780521027625.
- Levi, Isaac (1986). Hard choices: decision making under unresolved conflict. Cambridge; New York: Cambridge University Press. ISBN 9780521386302.
- Levi, Isaac (1991). The fixation of belief and its undoing: changing beliefs through inquiry. Cambridge, Massachusetts: Cambridge University Press. ISBN 9780521110297.
- Levi, Isaac (1996). For the sake of the argument: Ramsey Test conditionals, inductive inference and nonmonotonic reasoning. Cambridge, Massachusetts: Cambridge University Press. ISBN 9780521039017.
- Levi, Isaac (1997). The covenant of reason: rationality and the commitments of thought. Cambridge; New York: Cambridge University Press. ISBN 9781139173032.

=== Chapters in books ===
- Levi, Isaac (2009), "Convexity and separability in representing consensus", in Kanbur, Ravi; Basu, Kaushik (eds.), Arguments for a better world: essays in honor of Amartya Sen | Volume I: Ethics, welfare, and measurement, Oxford New York: Oxford University Press, pp. 193–212, ISBN 9780199239115.

== See also ==
- American philosophy
- List of American philosophers
