= Cursed Days =

Book by Ivan Bunin

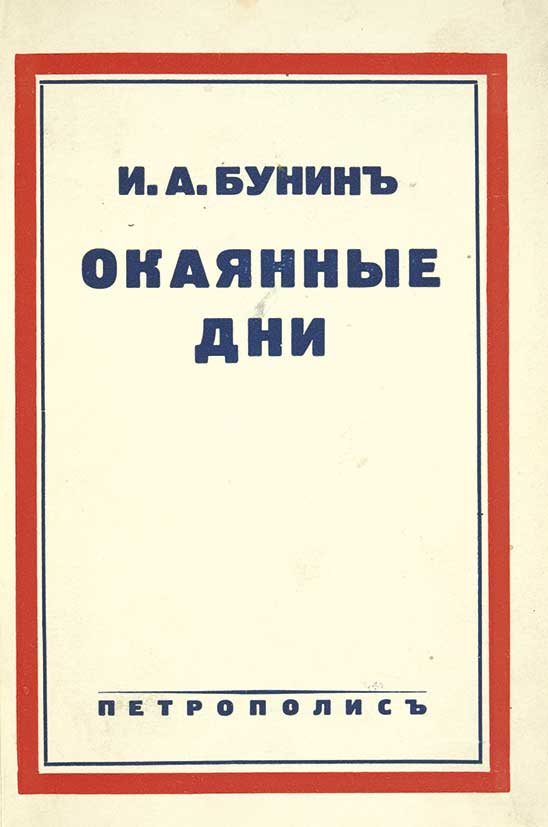
- Author: Ivan Bunin
- Original title: Окаянные дни
- Translator: Thomas Gaiton Marullo
- Language: Russian
- Genre: diary
- Publisher: Vozrozhdenye(Paris, 1926); Petropolis (Berlin, 1936); Ivan R. Dee Publishers (Chicago, 1998)
- Publication date: 1926
- Publication place: France
- Media type: print (hardback & paperback)
- Preceded by: Mitya's Love (1925)

Cursed Days (Russian: Окаянные дни, romanized: Okayannye dni) is a book by Nobel Prize-winning Russian author Ivan Bunin, compiled of diaries and notes he made while in Moscow and Odessa in 1918–1920. Fragments from it were published in 1925–1926 by the Paris-based Vozrozhdenye newspaper. In its full version Cursed Days appeared in the Vol.X of The Complete Bunin (1936), compiled and published in Berlin by the Petropolis publishing house. In the USSR the book remained banned up until the late 1980s. Parts of it were included in the 1988 Moscow edition of The Complete Bunin (Vol. VI). After the collapse of the Soviet Union, Cursed Days became immensely popular in its author's homeland. Since 1991, no less than fifteen separate editions of Bunin's diary/notebook have been published in Russia. The English translation, made by Bunin scholar Thomas Gaiton Marullo, was published (as Cursed Days. A Diary of the Revolution) in 1998 in the United States by Chicago-based Ivan R. Dee Publishers.

== Background ==
In 1920, after three years of great anguish, Ivan Bunin left his country forever. In the years that led up to his exile, he kept an account of (in words of one reviewer) "the ever widening bestiality that accompanied the consolidation of Bolshevik power." Depending much on newspapers and rumors, Bunin misunderstood some of the events or related the biased versions of them and often let his anger get in the way of reason. Still, according to The New York Times, "these are the (mostly) immediate reactions of a man whose instincts have been proved eminently right, who knew that, with the victory of the Bolsheviks, the worst would happen."

Using Cursed Days as a forum to castigate the CPSU's leaders, publishers, and the intellectuals like Aleksandr Blok and Maxim Gorky who joined their ranks, Bunin labeled the Soviet elite criminals. He repeatedly compared the Bolsheviks to the Jacobin Club during the Reign of Terror. Bunin also cited parallels between the Red Terror and the peasant uprisings of the 17th and 18th century, led by Stenka Razin, Emelian Pugachev, and Bohdan Khmelnitsky. The diary's English translator, Thomas Gaiton Marullo, has described Cursed Days as a rare example of dystopian nonfiction and points out multiple parallels between the diary of Bunin and the diary kept by D-503, the protagonist of Yevgeny Zamyatin's dystopian science fiction novel We.

=== Publication ===
On July 30, 1925, Vera Muromtseva-Bunina wrote in her diary: "Ian [her name for her husband] has torn up and burned all his diary manuscripts. I am very angry. "I don't want to be seen in my underwear," he told me". Seeing Vera so upset, Bunin confided to her: "I have another diary in the form of a notebook in Paris..." According to some sources, "this was the diary that Bunin published under the title Cursed Days". In fact, Bunin destroyed his notes written in 1925, and the Paris manuscript Vera referred to were recent ones. By the end of July 1925 fragments of Cursed Days were already being published for almost two months by Pyotr Struve's newspaper, which had then recently started publication. On June 4, 1925, Vera Muromtseva-Bunina wrote in her diary: "[The first issue of] Vozrozhdenye came out. All is well, and the editorial stuff is good. [...] They started publishing Cursed Days.

== Critical reception ==
According to the book's translator, professor of Russian at Notre Dame University (who had already published the first two of three volumes of a biography of Bunin in his own words) Thomas Gaiton Marullo, -

The work is important for several reasons. Cursed Days is one of the very few anti-Bolshevik diaries to be preserved from the time of the Russian Revolution and civil war. It recreates events with graphic and gripping immediacy. Unlike the works of early Soviets and emigres and their self-censoring backdrop of memory, myth, and political expediency, Bunin's truth reads almost like an aberration. Cursed Days also links Russian anti-utopian writing of the 19th century to its counterpart in the 20th century. Reminiscent of the fiction of Dostoevsky, it features an 'underground man' who does not wish to be an 'organ stop' or to affirm 'crystal palaces'. Bunin's diary foreshadowed such 'libelous' memoirs as Evgenia Ginsberg's Journey into the Whirlwind (1967) and Within the Whirlwind, and Nadezhda Mandelstam's Hope Against Hope (1970) and Hope Abandoned (1974), the accounts of two courageous women caught up in the Stalinist terror of the 1930s. Cursed Days also preceded the "rebellious" anti-Soviet tradition that began with Evgeny Zamyatin and Yury Olesha, moved on to Mikhail Bulgakov, and reached an apex with Boris Pasternak and Alexander Solzhenitsyn. One can argue that, in its painful exposés of political and social utopias, Cursed Days heralded the anti-utopian writing of George Orwell and Aldous Huxley. Bunin and Zamyatin had correctly understood that the Soviet experiment was destined to self destruct."

Powell's Books reviewer describes Bunin's "great anti-Bolshevik diary of the Russian Revolution" as a "chilling account of the last days of the Russian master in his homeland" where the time of revolution and civil war is recreated "with graphic and gripping immediacy". "Unlike the works of early Soviets and emigres, with their self-censoring backdrop of memory, myth, and political expediency, Bunin 's uncompromising truths are jolting", full of "pain and suffering in witnessing the takeover of his country by thugs and the chaos of civil war", the reviewer argues.

The film, Sunstroke, based on Cursed Days was released in 2014 and was directed by Nikita Mikhalkov.

=== The American edition ===

In 1998 the first English translation of the book was published in the US by Ivan R. Dee Publishers under the title Cursed Days. A Diary of the Revolution. Reviewers praised the work of translator, Thomas Gaiton Marullo, a noted scholar on Russian literature, the author of two previous volumes on Bunin's life and works, "Ivan Bunin: Russian Requiem, 1885-1920" and "Ivan Bunin: From the Other Shore, 1920-1933" who also provided preface, introduction, and footnotes so as to guide the Western reader through the cascade of Russian names and historical references, giving the reader a sense of Bunin, the man, while also providing extensive information about contextual issues, carefully explain the writer's comments on colleagues, publishers, newspapers, journals, and politicians.

=== 1917-1918 diaries ===
The book had a prequel, Bunin's diaries dated August 1, 1917, - May 14, 1918, occasionally referred to as Cursed Days (1917-1918). In the USSR it was published for the first time in Novy Mir magazine's 1965 October issue, heavily censored. These diaries were included into the Vol.VI of the 1988 edition of the Soviet version of The Complete Bunin (published by Khudozhestvennaya Literatura publishing house) in 1988 and later into the Vol. VIII of the 2000 edition by Moskovsky Rabochy.

== Quotes ==
- "March 5/18, 1918. It's grey out with some sparse snow. There was a crowd of people outside the banks on Il'inka Street--the smart ones are taking their money out. Generally speaking, many people are preparing to leave in secret. Tonight's paper reports that the Germans have taken Kharkov. The man who sold me the newspaper said to me: 'Better the Devil than Lenin."
- "April 20/May 3, 1919... It's a terrible thing to say, but it's the truth: if it were not for the misfortunes of the folk, thousands of our intellectuals would be profoundly unhappy people. How else could they have sat around and protested? What else would they have cried and written about? Without the folk, life would not have been life for them."
- "May 2/15, 1919. Members of the Red Army in Odessa led a pogrom against the Jews in the town of Big Fountain. Ovsyaniko-Kulikovsky and the writer Kipen happened to be there and told me the details. Fourteen comissars and thirty Jews from among the common people were killed. Many stores were destroyed. The soldiers tore through the night, dragged the victims from their beds, and killed whomever they met. People ran into the steppe or rushed into the sea. They were chased after and fired upon -- a genuine hunt, as it were. Kipen saved himself by accident -- fortunately he had spent the night not in his home, but at the White Flower sanitorium. At dawn, a detachment of Red Army soldiers appeared 'Are there any Jews here?' they asked the watchman. 'No, no Jews here.' 'Swear what you're saying is true!' The watchman swore, and they went on farther. Moisei Gutman, a cabby, was killed. He was a dear man who moved us from our dacha last fall."
- "April 23/May 6, 1919. Before I left Petersburg I visited the Peter and Paul Cathedral. Everything was wide open -- the fortress gates and the Cathedral doors. Idle people were roaming about everywhere, looking around and spitting out sunflower seeds. I walked around the Cathedral, looked at where the Tsars were buried, and, with a bow to the ground, I begged their forgiveness. Coming out on the church porch, I stood for a long time in a state of shock: the entire universe that was Russia at springtime was opening up before my very attentive eyes. Spring and the Easter chimes called forth feelings of joy and of resurrection, but an immense grave yawned in the world. Death was in this spring, the final kiss... 'The world did not know disappointment,' Herzen said, 'until the great French Revolution; skepticism arrived together with the Republic of 1792.' As far as Russia is concerned, we will carry to the grave the greatest disappointment in the world."
- "June 4/17, 1919. The Entente has named Kolchak the Supreme Ruler of Russia. Izvestia wrote an obscene article saying: 'Tell us, you reptile, how much did they pay you for that?' The devil with them. I crossed myself with tears of joy."
