= Anthem (novella) =

1938 novella by Ayn Rand

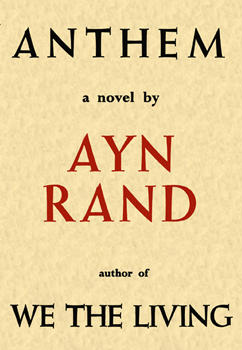
- Cover of the first edition
- Author: Ayn Rand
- Language: English
- Genre: Science fiction
- Publisher: Cassell (first); Pamphleteers (revised)
- Publication date: 1938 (first); 1946 (revised)
- OCLC: 32132103
- Text: Anthem at Wikisource

Anthem is a dystopian fiction novella by Russian-born American writer Ayn Rand, written in 1937 and first published in 1938 in the United Kingdom. The story takes place at an unspecified future date when humankind has entered another Dark Age. Technological advancement is now carefully planned and the concept of individuality has been eliminated. A young man known as Equality 7-2521 rebels by doing secret scientific research. When his activity is discovered, he flees into the wilderness and is followed by Liberty 5-3000, a woman he loves. Together they plan to establish a new society based on rediscovered individualism.

Rand originally conceived of the story as a play, then decided to write for magazine publication. At her agent's suggestion, she submitted it to book publishers. The novella was first published by Cassell in England. It was published in the United States only after Rand's next novel, The Fountainhead, became a best seller. Rand revised the text for the US edition published in 1946.

== Plot ==
Equality 7-2521, a 21-year-old man writing by candlelight in a tunnel under the earth, tells the story of his life up to that point. He exclusively uses plural pronouns ("we", "our", "they") to refer to himself and others. He was raised like all children in his society, away from his parents in collective homes: the Home of Infants from birth until five years old, then the Home of Students from five to fifteen. He believes he has a "curse" that makes him learn quickly and ask many questions. He excels at the Science of Things and dreams of becoming a Scholar, but when the Council of Vocations assigns his Life Mandate at fifteen, he is assigned to be a Street Sweeper.

Equality 7-2521 accepts his street sweeping assignment as penance for his Transgression of Preference in secretly desiring to be a Scholar. He works with the handicapped Union 5-3992 and International 4-8818, the latter of whom is Equality 7-2521's only friend (which is another Transgression of Preference, because all are supposedly equal in their society). Despite International 4-8818's protests that any exploration unauthorized by a Council is forbidden, Equality 7-2521 explores an underground tunnel near the City Theatre tent, and finds metal tracks. Equality 7-2521 believes the tunnel is from the Unmentionable Times of the distant past. He begins sneaking away from his community at night to use the tunnel as a laboratory for scientific experiments, using garbage he has taken from the Home of the Scholars. He is using stolen paper from the Home of the Clerks to write his journal by candlelight, using candles stolen from the larder at the Home of the Street Sweepers.

While cleaning a road at the edge of the city, Equality 7-2521 meets Liberty 5-3000, a 17-year-old Peasant girl who works in the fields. He commits another transgression by thinking constantly of her, instead of waiting to be assigned a woman at the annual Time of Mating, in which men aged twenty and over, and women of eighteen and over, are assigned to each other solely for breeding. She has dark eyes and golden hair, and he names her "The Golden One". When he speaks to her, he discovers that she also thinks of him. He reveals his secret name for her, and Liberty 5-3000 tells Equality 7-2521 she has named him "The Unconquered".

Continuing his scientific work, Equality 7-2521 rediscovers electricity. In the ruins of the tunnel, he finds a glass box with wires that gives off light when he passes electricity through it. He decides to take his discovery to the World Council of Scholars; he thinks such a great gift to mankind will outweigh his many transgressions and lead to him being made a Scholar. However, one night, his absence from the Home of the Street Sweepers is noticed. He is whipped and held in the Palace of Corrective Detention. The night before the World Council of Scholars is set to meet, he easily escapes; essentially walking out of the hall as there are no guards because no one has ever attempted escape before. The next day, he presents his work to the World Council of Scholars. Horrified that he has done unauthorized research, they assail him as a "wretch" and a "gutter cleaner" and say he must be punished. They want to destroy his discovery so it will not disrupt the plans of the World Council and the Department of Candles. Equality 7-2521 seizes the box, cursing the council before fleeing into the Uncharted Forest that lies outside the city.

In the forest, Equality 7-2521 sees himself as damned for having left his fellow men, but he enjoys his freedom. No one will pursue him into this forbidden place. He only misses Liberty 5-3000. On his second day of living in the forest, Liberty 5-3000 appears; she followed him into the forest and vows to stay with him forever. They live together in the forest and try to express their love for one another, but they lack the words to speak of love as individuals.

They find a house from the Unmentionable Times in the mountains and decide to live in it. While reading books from the house's library, Equality 7-2521 discovers the word "I" and tells Liberty 5-3000 about it. Her first words to him are, “I love you.” Having rediscovered individuality, they give themselves new names from the books: Equality 7-2521 becomes "Prometheus" and Liberty 5-3000 becomes "Gaea". Months later, Gaea is pregnant with Prometheus's child. Prometheus wonders how men in the past could have given up their individuality; he plans a future in which they will regain it.

== History ==
=== Development ===
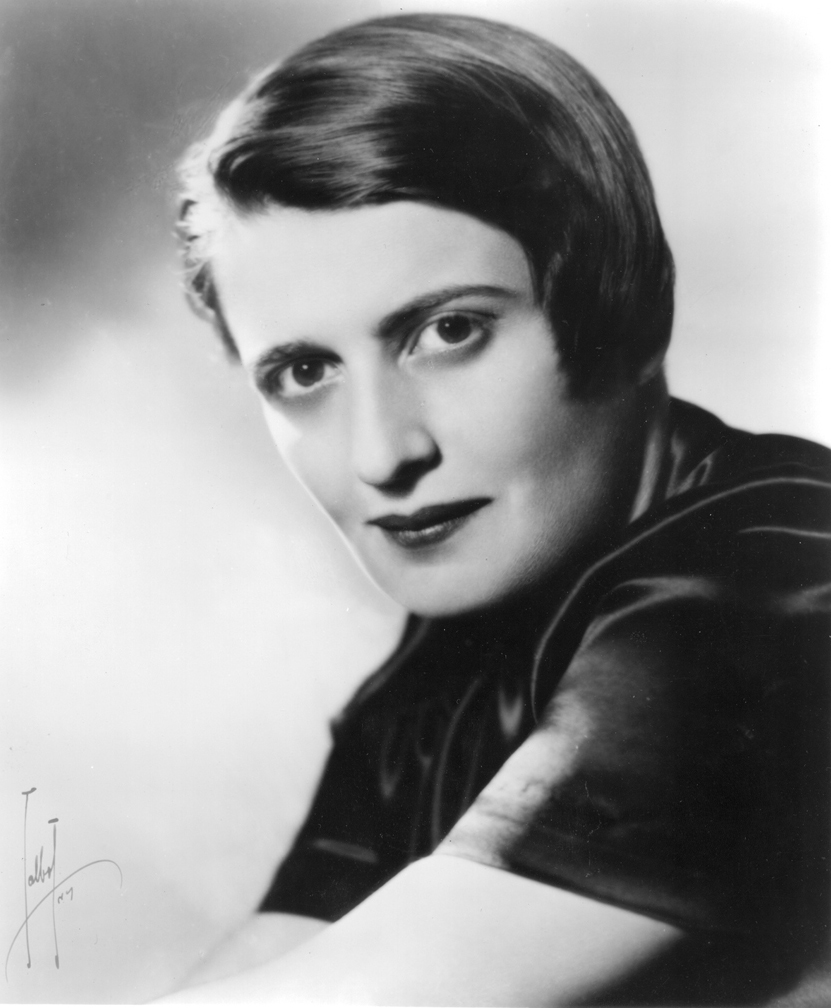
Ayn Rand in 1943

Ayn Rand initially conceived Anthem as a play when she was a teenager living in Soviet Russia. After migrating to the United States, Rand did not plan to write Anthem, but she reconsidered after reading a short story in The Saturday Evening Post set in the future. (Note: The story Rand read was probably "By the Waters of Babylon" by Stephen Vincent Benét, which was published as "The Place of the Gods" in the July 31, 1937, issue of the Post.) Seeing that mainstream magazines would publish speculative fiction, she decided to try submitting Anthem to them. She wrote the story in the summer of 1937, while taking a break from research she was doing for her next novel, The Fountainhead.

Rand's working title was Ego. Leonard Peikoff explains the meaning behind this title: "[Rand] is (implicitly) upholding the central principles of her philosophy and of her heroes: reason, values, volition, individualism." Thinking that the original title was too blunt, unemotional, and would give away too much of the theme, Rand changed the title to Anthem. "The present novel, in Miss Rand's mind, was from the outset an ode to man's ego. It was not difficult, therefore, to change the working title: to move from 'ego' to 'ode' or 'anthem', leaving the object celebrated by the ode to be discovered by the reader."

There are similarities between Anthem and the 1921 novel We by Yevgeny Zamyatin, another author who had lived in Communist Russia. These include:

- A novel taking the form of a secret diary or journal.
- People are identified by codes instead of names.
- Children separated from their parents and brought up by the State.
- Individualism disposed of in favor of collective will.
- A male protagonist who discovers individuality through his relationship with a female character.
- A forest as a 'free' place outside the "dystopian" city.
- The protagonist discovers a link to the past, when people were free, in a tunnel under the Earth.

There are also a number of differences between the two stories. For example, the society of We is in no scientific or technological decay, featuring X-rays, airplanes, microphones, and so on. In contrast, the people of Anthem believe that the world is flat and the sun revolves around it, and that bleeding people is a decent form of medicine. The similarities have led to speculation about whether Rand's story was directly influenced by Zamyatin's. However, there is little evidence that Rand was influenced by (or had even read) Zamyatin's work; she never mentioned the novel in discussions of her life in Russia.

=== Publication history ===
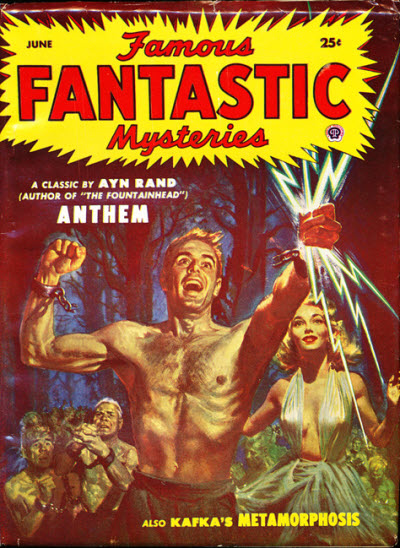
Anthem was reprinted in the June 1953 issue of the pulp magazine Famous Fantastic Mysteries.

Initially, Rand planned on publishing Anthem as a magazine story or serial, but her agent encouraged her to publish it as a book. She submitted it simultaneously to Macmillan Publishers in America and Cassell in England. Both had handled her previous novel, We the Living. Cassell agreed to publish Anthem, but Macmillan declined it. According to Peikoff, "[Macmillan's] comment was: the author does not understand socialism." Another American publisher also turned it down, and Rand's agent was unable to sell it as a magazine serial. Cassell published it in England in 1938.

After the success of The Fountainhead, a revised edition of Anthem was published in the US in 1946 by Pamphleteers, Inc., a small libertarian-oriented publishing house owned by Rand's friends Leonard Read and William C. Mullendore. A 50th Anniversary Edition was published in 1995, including an appendix which reproduces the Cassell edition with Rand's handwritten editorial changes.

Since its publication in 1946, the revised version of Anthem has sold more than 3.5 million copies.

== Reception ==
=== Critical response ===
The original UK edition received mostly positive reviews; several praised Rand's imagination and her support of individualism. In The Sunday Times, reviewer Dilys Powell complimented its "simplicity and sincerity". Anti-communist journalist Malcolm Muggeridge gave a mixed review in The Daily Telegraph, saying it had appeal, but its dystopia was not believable. A short review by Maurice Richardson in The Observer said it was "highly unconvincing, in spite of some extremely eloquent writing".

Reviewing the 1953 American first hardcover edition for a genre audience, Anthony Boucher and J. Francis McComas were unsympathetic. Saying that "Rand implies that a sinister conspiracy of purveyors of brotherhood has prevented its American publication until now", they ironically concluded, "One can only regret that the conspiracy finally broke down." (Caxton Press offered this first U.S. edition in boards in 1953, while the pulp magazine Famous Fantastic Mysteries included reprints of both Franz Kafka's "The Metamorphosis" and Anthem in the magazine's final, June 1953 issue.)

=== Awards and nominations ===
The Libertarian Futurist Society awarded Anthem its Hall of Fame Award in 1987. In 2014, Anthem was nominated for a Retrospective Hugo Award for "Best Novella".

== Legacy ==
=== Adaptations ===
Following the release of Anthem in the United States, Rand explored opportunities for having it adapted to other media. She had discussions about potential film, opera, and ballet adaptations, but these projects were never realized. In 1946, Rand wrote to Walt Disney that if a screen adaptation were possible, "I would like to see it done in stylized drawings, rather than with living actors."

In 1950, a radio adaptation was done for The Freedom Story, a weekly radio program produced by Spiritual Mobilization, a Christian libertarian group. In 2011, it was released as an unabridged audiobook by ABN, the narration by Jason McCoy described as 'stirring and evocative'.

In 1991, Michael Paxton wrote, directed, and co-produced a stage adaptation of Anthem, which appeared at the Lex Theater in Hollywood. The book was adapted into a stage play in 2013 by Jeff Britting, the department manager of the Ayn Rand Archives at the Ayn Rand Institute. First performed in Denver, it opened Off-Broadway in September 2013 at the Jerome Robbins Theater. The New York Times review stated, "For a play that celebrates the individual, Anthem sure doesn’t trust its audience. Instead of illustrating ideas, this sporadically interesting show too often delivers exposition, desperate to overexplain rather than risk a moment of misunderstanding." The novella also inspired a spoof rock musical, premiering Off-Broadway at the Lynn Redgrave Theatre in May 2014. The cast included Randy Jones of The Village People, Jason Gotay, Jenna Leigh Green, Remy Zaken, and Ashley Kate Adams. The review in The New York Times criticized the acting of the leads, but called the show "exuberant" and better than a straight adaptation.

In 2011, Anthem was adapted into a graphic novel by Charles Santino, with artwork by Joe Staton. In 2018, a second graphic novel adaptation was produced, unrelated to the 2011 adaptation, adapted by Jennifer Grossman and Dan Parsons.

=== Influence ===
The work has inspired many musical pieces, including full-length albums. According to Enzo Stuarti, Pat Boone composed the lyrics and his friend Frank Lovejoy wrote the, quoting Stuarti, "Prelude to this next offering," of "The Exodus Song", featured in the album Stuarti Arrives at Carnegie Hall. The song begins with a line right out of Anthem. In another point of the song it reads: "...I guard my treasures: my thought, my will, my land, and my freedom. And the greatest of these is freedom." In Anthem, it reads: "...I guard my treasures: my thought, my will, my land, my freedom. And the greatest of these is freedom." A memo to Rand dated May 4, 1964, mentions the unauthorized adaptation, but there is no indication that she took any legal action.

Robert Silverberg's 1971 novel A Time of Changes also depicts a society where I is a forbidden word and where the protagonist rebels against this prohibition. In a 2009 preface to a reprint edition of his novel, Silverberg said he had read Anthem in 1953, but had long forgotten it when he wrote A Time of Changes. He was surprised to see the similarities when he rediscovered Rand's story, but said overall the two books are very different.

Anthem is also credited by Neil Peart for influencing Rush's "2112" with strong parallels to the plot, structure, and theme of Anthem. Peart has said that although he read Anthem, he was not consciously thinking of the story when he wrote the song; however, when he recognized there were similarities, he gave credit to "the genius of Ayn Rand" in the liner notes. The band also released a song called "Anthem" on their Fly by Night album, and their Canadian record label (co-founded by Rush manager Ray Danniels) is Anthem Records.

Among Rand's works, Anthem is one of the most commonly assigned as secondary school reading. The Ayn Rand Institute provides free copies of the novel for use in schools, and holds an annual Anthem essay contest for students.

== See also ==
- Linguistic relativity
- We (1982 film)
- We (novel)
