= Long Table =

Performance art piece by Lois Weaver

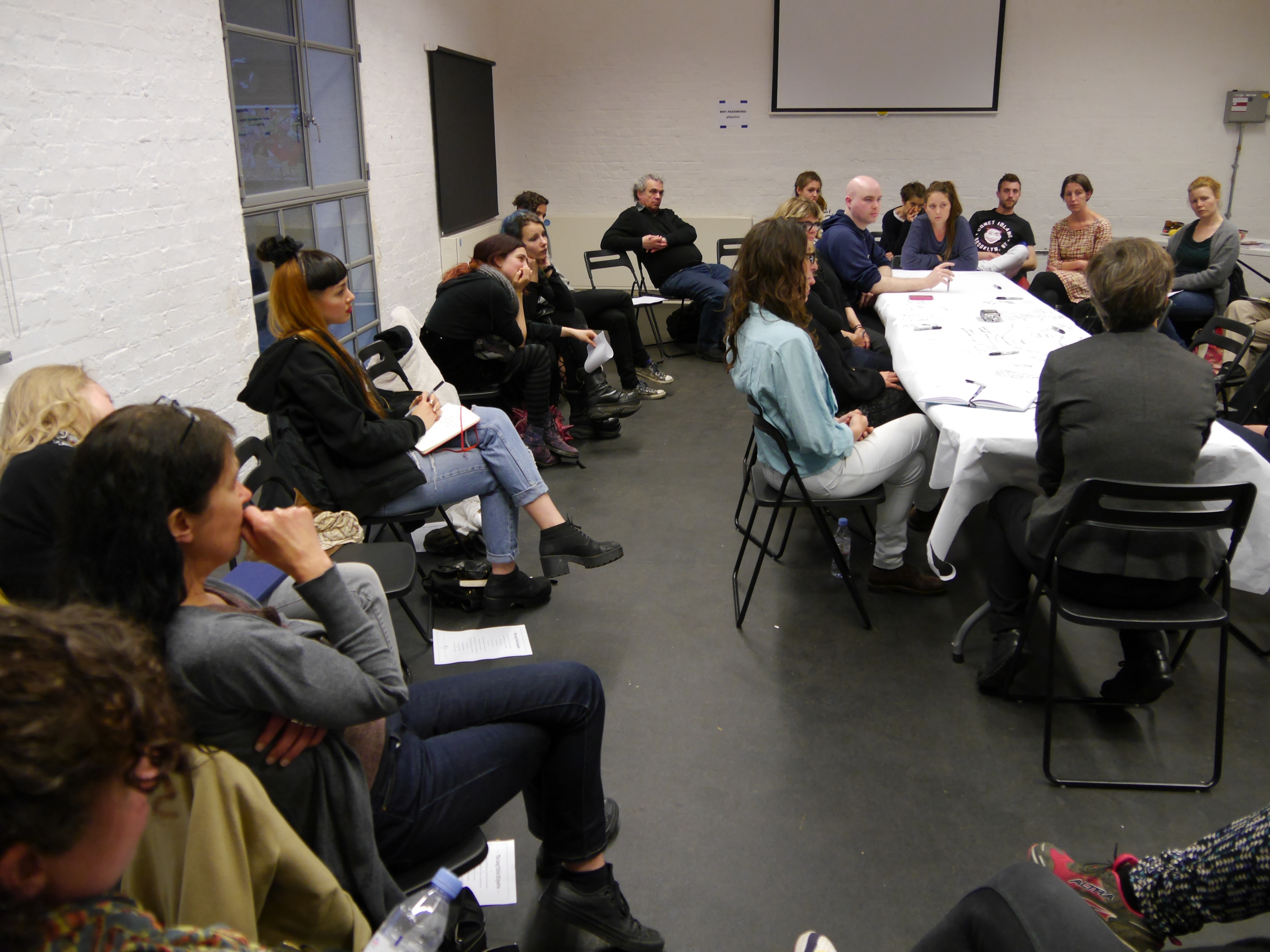
2014 long table on "Live Art and Feminism"

The Long Table is an "experimental open public forum that is a hybrid performance-installation-roundtable-discussion-dinner-party designed to facilitate dialogue through the gathering together of people with common interests" developed by the artist and academic Lois Weaver. The Long Table is part of Weaver's Public Address Systems project, under the strand "Strategies for Engaging the Public Through the Everyday".

The idea was inspired by the 1995 Dutch film Antonia's Line, directed by Marleen Gorris. The film won many awards, including the Academy Award for Best Foreign Language Film.

== Development ==
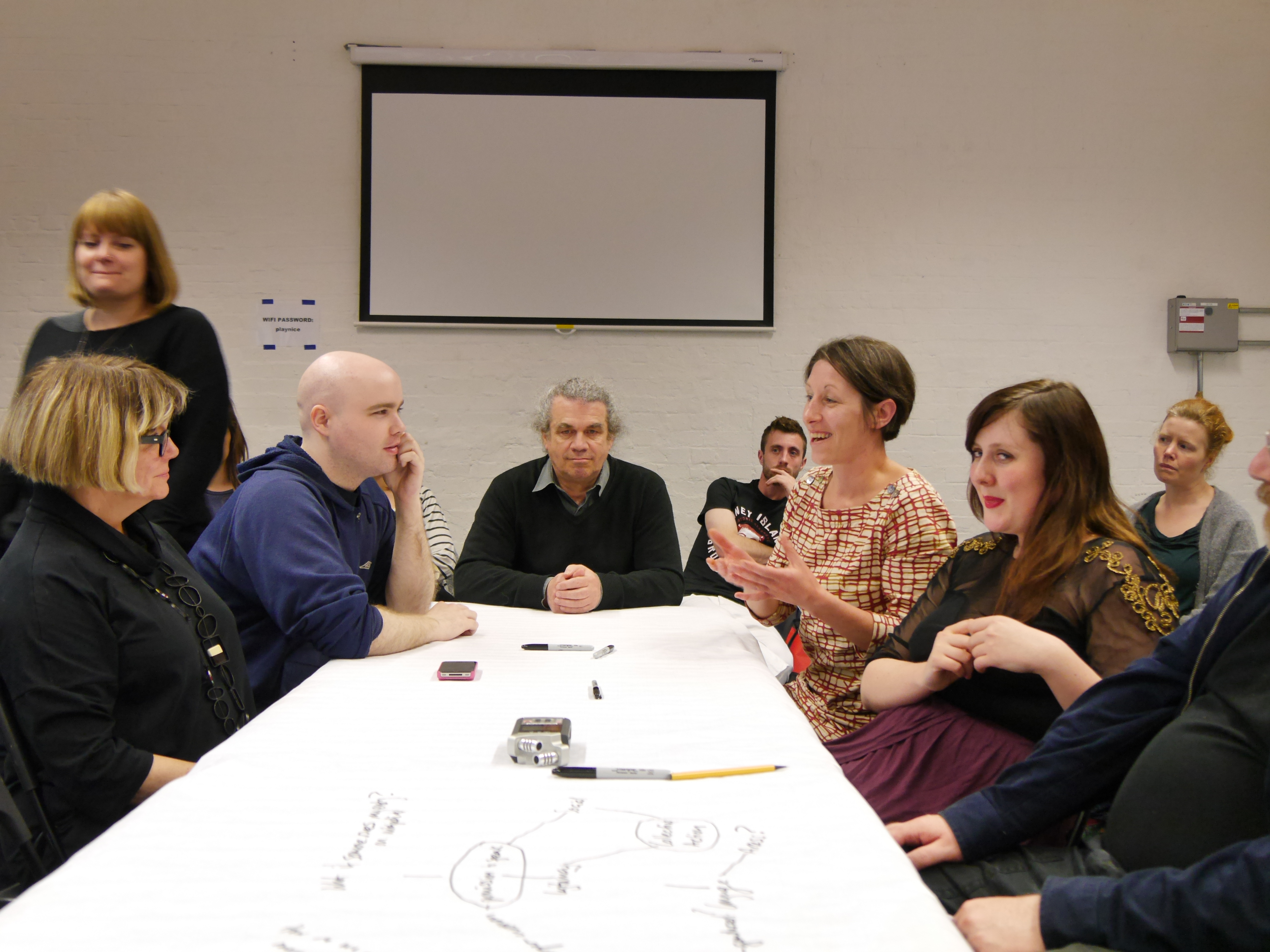
2014 long table on "Live Art and Feminism" at LADA, with Lois Weaver seated left

The Long Table development was funded by grants from the Arts and Humanities Research Council in 2003, and the Regional Lottery Program and the Arts Council of England in 2004. The first Long Table a "Long Table on Feminism", was held as part of the Live Art Development Agency's (LADA) third Restock Rethink Reflect initiative, and constituted a discussion on what and who is missing from historical accounts, and what to do about it. The event was attended by over 100 artists and thinkers.

== Common Elements ==
The Long Table was designed to stage public conversations around difficult subjects. Long Tables begin with a group of people sitting around a table that is set with empty chairs. To begin the conversation a question is asked, and participants are able to take a seat at the table if they wish to speak. Participants are not allowed to speak unless they are sitting at the table, and they may join or leave the table at any time. If there are no seats available they are permitted to ask for a seat.

The event has been described as 'a performance of a dinner party where conversation is the only course.'

== Locations ==
The Long Table has been installed in many locations, including Casa de Lapa, Rio de Janeiro; Tanzquartier Wein, Vienna; National Review of Live Art, Glasgow; University of Indiana, Illinois; Queen Mary University of London, Space Gallery, Battersea Arts Centre, London International Festival of Theatre, and South Bank, London; Hemispheric Institute’s Encuentro in Buenos Aires, Argentina.

=== 2009 ===
- Feminism, Red Room Platform: Women’s Edition, London
- Queer Autobiography, Queer Autobiography Conference, King's College London
- Change in America, Performance Studies international, Zagreb, Croatia
- Unfinished Business and Gender and Citizenship, Hemispheric Institute of Performance and Politics, Encuentro 2009: Staging Citizenship, Bogota, Colombia

=== 2010 ===
- Lineages, Memories, Legacies, The Pigs of Today are the Hams of Tomorrow Symposium, Plymouth Arts Centre Plymouth, England
- The Artist, the People, the Place, Outside Air Festival, Queen Mary, University of London
- Putting the People Back in the People’s Palace, Outside Air Festival, Queen Mary, University of London

=== 2013 ===
- Possibilities Rooted in Afro-Futurism, Hemispheric Institute, NYC
- What is the State of 'Remix' in 2013?, REFEST, NYC

=== 2014 ===
"Live Art and Feminism" at Live Art Development Agency, Hackney

=== 2015 ===
- A Long Table on Why Sex Matters, Wellcome Collection, London

=== 2016 ===
- And, Ain't I a Woman: Long Table Conversation and Installation, Gallery 74, Rochester NY
- Long Table Series, Performance Space New York, NYC

=== 2017 ===
- BME Success & Belonging at QMUL & Beyond, organized by Dr. Daniel Hartley, Researcher, Engagement, Retention, Success and Student Co-Researchers, Nadia Hafedh & Dushant Patel, Queen Mary, University of London
- Mental Health and Wellbeing, School for Advanced Studies in the Arts and Humanities at Western University, Ontario Canada
- Progress Festival Long Table, presented by SummerWorks in collaboration with FADO and Rhubarb Festival, Toronto Canada
