= Broken Mirrors (1984 film) =

1984 Dutch film

- Dutch: Gebroken spiegels
- Directed by: Marleen Gorris
- Written by: Marleen Gorris
- Produced by: Matthijs van Heijningen
- Starring: Lineke Rijxman; Henriëtte Tol; Edda Barends
- Cinematography: Frans Bromet
- Edited by: Hans van Dongen
- Music by: Lodewijk de Boer
- Production company: Sigma Film Productions
- Distributed by: Tuschinski Filmdistribution
- Release date: 27 September 1984
- Running time: 112 minutes
- Country: Netherlands
- Language: Dutch

Broken Mirrors (Dutch: Gebroken spiegels) is a Dutch thriller drama film, directed by Marleen Gorris and released in 1984. An exploration of the oppression of women, the film juxtaposes the story of a group of prostitutes living in a brothel with the story of a man who kidnaps women and tortures them.

The cast includes Lineke Rijxman, Henriëtte Tol, Edda Barends, Coby Stunnenberg, Carla Hardy, Marijke Veugelers, Arline Renfurm, Anke van 't Hof, Hedda Oledzky, Elja Pelgrom, Johan Leysen, Rolf Leenders, Eddie Brugman, Beppie Melissen and Wim Wama.

The film premiered in September 1984 at the Utrecht Film Festival. It was later screened at international film festivals including the 35th Berlin International Film Festival, the 1985 Toronto International Film Festival, and the 1985 Frameline Film Festival.

At Frameline, the film was the winner of the Audience Award.
