= Ayn Rand: A Sense of Life =

1996 American documentary film by Michael Paxton

- Original film poster
- Directed by: Michael Paxton
- Written by: Michael Paxton
- Produced by: Michael Paxton
- Narrated by: Sharon Gless
- Cinematography: Alik Sakharov
- Edited by: Christopher Earl; Lauren A. Schaffer
- Music by: Jeff Britting
- Distributed by: Strand Releasing
- Release date: November 2, 1996
- Running time: 145 minutes
- Country: United States
- Language: English

Ayn Rand: A Sense of Life is a 1996 American documentary film written, produced, and directed by Michael Paxton. Its focus is on novelist and philosopher Ayn Rand, the author of the bestselling novels The Fountainhead and Atlas Shrugged, who promoted her philosophy of Objectivism through her books, articles, speeches, and media appearances.

== Overview ==
Actress Sharon Gless narrates the story of Rand's life and an overview of her ideas. In addition to color and black-and-white archival footage of Rand, the film includes appearances by philosophers Harry Binswanger and Leonard Peikoff, CBS News correspondent Mike Wallace, television interviewers Phil Donahue and Tom Snyder, architect Frank Lloyd Wright, political figures Joseph Stalin and Leon Trotsky, and Hollywood personalities Cecil B. DeMille, Edith Head, Adolphe Menjou, Marilyn Monroe, and Robert Taylor.

== History ==
Paxton first encountered Rand's work in 1970 at the age of 13, when he read her novel We the Living. In 1977 he saw her speak at the Ford Hall Forum, an experience that he later cited as an inspiration for his approach to the documentary.

== Production and release ==
Paxton spent four years working on the film. It was completed in 1996 and appeared that year at the Telluride Film Festival. On November 2, 1996, it premiered in Los Angeles with a special screening to benefit the Ayn Rand Institute. In January 1997, it appeared at the Slamdance Film Festival.

== Reception ==
=== Reviews ===
Janet Maslin of The New York Times called the film "a pedantic specimen," "dutiful in outlook and utterly conventional in format," and said it "does little beyond appreciating its subject as unwaveringly as possible." Film critic Leonard Maltin gave the film 2.5 stars out of 4, and commented: "Too long – and pedantic – for some viewers, but a must for Rand enthusiasts."

Mick LaSalle of the San Francisco Chronicle said the film "is not what one might expect at this stage in Rand's literary afterlife. The film doesn't make a case for her as an artist or philosopher, nor does it delineate her place in the pantheon of letters. It just assumes her importance and goes about telling her story ... Obviously this was a woman of enormous courage, tenacity and fire. That comes through enough in Ayn Rand to make one wonder what she would have thought about the tone of the documentary, which at times borders on sappy ... The tone will become grating even to anyone who is in sympathy with Rand's work. Though the documentary concentrates on the biographical, it glosses over the major embarrassment of her personal life – her adulterous relationship with her much younger disciple, Nathaniel Branden ... Ayn Rand: A Sense of Life isn't nearly ambitious enough, but as an introduction to an important 20th century American voice, it works."

Todd McCarthy of Variety observed, "Benefiting from some first-rate archival, personal and commercial film material, Michael Paxton's Oscar-nominated effort serves as a solid and appreciative precis of her life and world views, but doesn't get down in the trenches to illustrate how and why she stirred up such passions pro and con, and gingerly refrains from analyzing the paradoxes and complexities of her personality and intimate relationships."

=== Box office ===
Following appearances at festivals and other limited venues, the film's regular theatrical release was on February 13, 1998. It earned $26,101 at two theaters in its opening weekend. When it closed its domestic theatrical run on November 12, 1998, it had grossed $205,246.

=== Awards and nominations ===
The film won the Satellite Award for Best Documentary Film. It was nominated for the Academy Award for Best Documentary Feature, but lost to The Long Way Home.

== DVD releases ==
Image Entertainment released an all-region DVD on October 19, 1999. A two-disc director's cut was issued by Strand Releasing on August 17, 2004. The film is in anamorphic widescreen format. Bonus features include an interview with screenwriter/producer/director Michael Paxton, additional interviews with friends of Ayn Rand, outtakes, a deleted dance sequence, a photo gallery, the complete filmed version of Rand's play Ideal, and cast and crew biographies.
