= De Zevende Hemel (2016 film) =

2016 Dutch musical drama film

- Directed by: Job Gosschalk
- Written by: Tijs van Marle; Job Gosschalk
- Produced by: Maarten Swart
- Starring: Henriëtte Tol; Tjitske Reidinga; Noortje Herlaar; Halina Reijn; Jan Kooijman; Huub Stapel; Ruben van der Meer; Thomas Acda
- Cinematography: Richard van Oosterhout
- Edited by: Jurriaan van Nimwegen
- Music by: Chrisnanne Wiegel; Melcher Meirmans; Joris Oonk
- Production company: Kaap Holland Film
- Distributed by: Entertainment One Benelux
- Release date: 24 November 2016 (Netherlands)
- Running time: 106 minutes
- Country: Netherlands
- Language: Dutch
- Box office: $1,691,161

De Zevende Hemel (English: The Seventh Heaven) is a 2016 Dutch jukebox musical drama film directed by Job Gosschalk from a script he co-wrote with Tijs van Marle and it stars Henriëtte Tol, Huub Stapel, Tjitske Reidinga and Halina Reijn. It follows Maria Rossi who runs an Italian restaurant with her husband, until an unexpected turn in her life requires her to reunite her whole family.

The film uses existing music from well-known Dutch artists including Trijntje Oosterhuis, Marco Borsato, Bløf, De Dijk, Guus Meeuwis, Nick & Simon, Boudewijn de Groot, Claudia de Breij and Doe Maar among others.

The film was released in Dutch theaters on 24 November 2016, it received mixed reviews from critics. It was awarded the Golden Film for having sold 100.000 tickets.

== Plot ==
The story follows a woman, Maria Rossi, who runs an Italian family restaurant, named de Zevende Hemel. When it is determined she is terminally ill, she wants her family to get together for the final time on a trip to Italy. This is easier said than done, as there are various number of family disputes getting in the way. At the same time there is also the upcoming anniversary of the restaurant.

== Cast ==
- Huub Stapel as Max
- Henriëtte Tol as Maria
- Tjitske Reidinga as Silke
- Halina Reijn as Eva
- Thomas Acda as Paul
- Ruben van der Meer as Bart
- Jan Kooijman as Matthijs
- Noortje Herlaar as Julia
- Roel Dirven as Roel

== Production ==
Production started on November 21, 2015, with Job Gosschalk in the director seat and produced by Kaap Holland Film. Producer Maarten Swart described the film as an ode to Dutch-language music including Trijntje Oosterhuis, Marco Borsato, Bløf, De Dijk, Guus Meeuwis, Nick & Simon, Boudewijn de Groot, Claudia de Breij and Doe Maar. The cast consisted of Henriëtte Tol as Maria Rossie, alongside Tjitske Reidinga, Huub Stapel, Halina Reijn, Ruben van der Meer, Thomas Acda and Huub van der Lubbe among others. Filming lasted until the end of March 2016 where it ended in Watergraafsmeer, Amsterdam. The actors sang the songs themselves.

== Release ==
The film has its premiere on 24 November 2016.

== Reception ==
The film received a mixed critical reception. De Telegraaf, AD and Trouw all gave it four stars out of five. Writing for the AD, Zagt Ab called the film a "daring film adventure" and the inclusion of music a "successful experiment" for a Dutch film.

On the negative side, De Volkskrant and the NRC Handelsblad gave it two stars. Bor Beekman for the Volkskrant, described the story as "risk averse" falling back into old boring clichés and found the usage of well-known songs added "very little value".

It earned the Golden Film for having 100.000 tickets sold on December 11, 2016. A couple days later, the award was given to Huub Stapel, Thomas Acda and Jan Kooijman while they were at the Tuschinski Theatre.
