= Antonia's Line =

1995 film

- Theatrical release poster
- Directed by: Marleen Gorris
- Written by: Marleen Gorris
- Produced by: Gerard Cornelisse; Hans de Weers; Hans de Wolf; George Brugmans
- Starring: Willeke van Ammelrooy; Els Dottermans; Jan Decleir; Marina de Graaf; Mil Seghers
- Cinematography: Willy Stassen
- Edited by: Wiebe van der Vliet
- Distributed by: Meteor Film
- Release dates: 12 September 1995 (TIFF); 21 September 1995
- Running time: 102 minutes
- Country: Netherlands
- Language: Dutch
- Budget: £1.5 million
- Box office: $4.2 million

Antonia's Line (Original title: Antonia) is a 1995 Dutch feminist film written and directed by Marleen Gorris. The film, described as a "feminist fairy tale", tells the story of the independent Antonia (Willeke van Ammelrooy) who, after returning to the anonymous Dutch village of her birth, establishes and nurtures a close-knit matriarchal community. The film covers a breadth of topics, with themes ranging from death and religion to sex, intimacy, lesbianism, friendship and love.

Antonia's Line was made after challenges in finding locations and funding in the 1980s and 1990s. It enjoyed critical success and several awards, including winning the Academy Award for Best Foreign Language Film at the 68th Academy Awards. The film also won the People's Choice Award at the 20th Toronto International Film Festival.

== Plot ==
Following World War II, the widow Antonia and her daughter Danielle arrive in Antonia's home town where her mother is dying. She reunites with her old friend Crooked Finger, a depressed intellectual who refuses to leave his house. She also begins attracting a following, including Deedee, a mentally handicapped girl, after she is raped by her brother Pitte, and Loony Lips, a simple-minded man who falls in love with Deedee. A pariah, Pitte flees the village. Antonia turns down an offer of marriage from Farmer Bas, but develops a lasting romance with him.

Danielle, who has a vivid imagination, becomes an artist and expresses interest in raising a child, while rejecting the idea of having a husband. Antonia and Danielle visit the city to find a man to impregnate Danielle, resulting in the birth of Therèse, a child prodigy. Danielle falls in love with Therèse's tutor, Lara, and they remain together in a lesbian relationship. Therèse develops an understanding and kinship with Crooked Finger beyond what Danielle could be capable of.

Years later, Pitte returns to town to collect his inheritance and rapes Therèse. Antonia places a curse on him, after which he is beaten by men of the village and drowned by his brother. Therèse is unable to find her intellectual match but eventually has a relationship with a childhood friend, resulting in her pregnancy. She decides to keep the baby and gives birth to Sarah, the film's narrator, who has a fascination with death. Sarah observes many of her elders die off, including Crooked Finger who commits suicide, and Loony Lips who suffers a tractor accident on the farm. Antonia later dies of old age, surrounded by family and friends.

== Cast ==
- Willeke van Ammelrooy as Antonia
- Els Dottermans as Danielle
- Jan Decleir as Farmer Bas
- Victor Löw as Harry
- Johan Heldenbergh as Tom
- Dora van der Groen as Allegonde
- Veerle van Overloop as Thérèse
- Esther Vriesendorp as Thérèse (aged 13)
- Carolien Spoor ^{(nl)} as Thérèse (aged 6)
- Thyrza Ravesteijn as Sarah
- Mil Seghers as Kromme Vinger (Crooked Finger)
- Elsie de Brauw as Lara
- Reinout Bussemaker ^{(nl)} as Simon
- Marina de Graaf ^{(nl)} as Deedee
- Jan Steen ^{(nl)} as Lippen Willem (Loony Lips)
- Catherine ten Bruggencate ^{(nl)} as Malle Madonna (Mad Madonna)
- Paul Kooij ^{(nl)} as Protestant

== Production ==
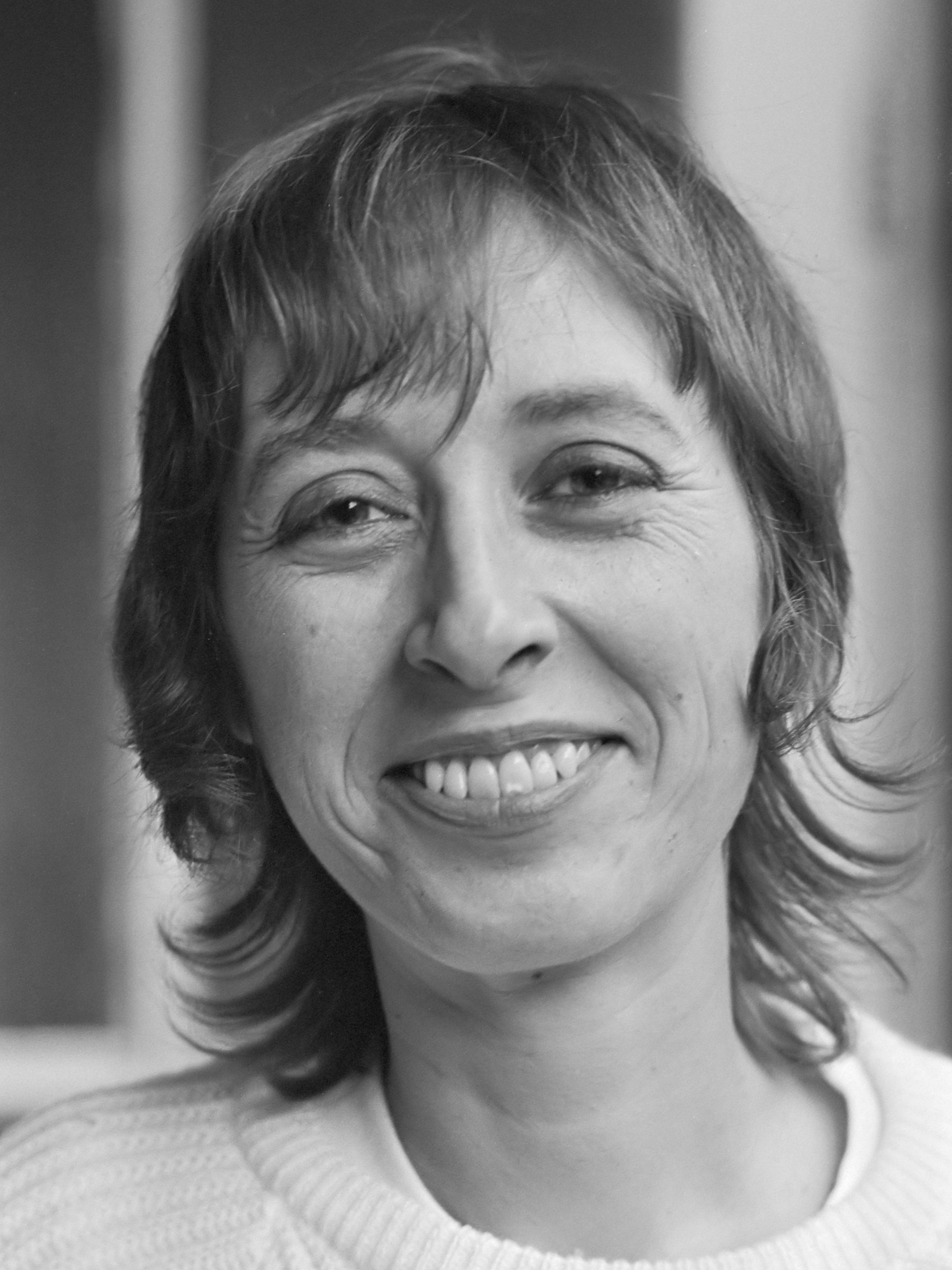
Director Marleen Gorris wrote the screenplay and won the Academy Award for Best Foreign Language Film.

Director and screenwriter Marleen Gorris envisioned the story as distinct from her previous work, such as A Question of Silence (1982), which she referred to as "indictments against society". She referred to Antonia as "a celebration of life", incorporating fairy tale elements and cruel details. Gorris finished the screenplay in 1988. However, making the film took three attempts, with challenges stemming from putting together a large cast and finding a village that could be portrayed as realistic for a 50-year period. It was eventually filmed in Belgium.

Another major challenge was finding investors. Funding ultimately came from the Netherlands, Belgium and the UK. With the help of producer Hans de Weers, Gorris found investors and also worked with British producer Judy Counihan of Red Hot Organization. The budget was £1.5 million. Filming finished in November 1994.

== Reception ==
=== Box office ===
In the Netherlands, the film grossed $272,294. In the United States, Antonia's Line opened in 99 theatres, and made $1.8 million in its first 10 days. After 164 days, it crossed the $4 million mark. According to Box Office Mojo, the film completed its run grossing $4,228,275 in North America and $21,046 in South Korea, for a worldwide total of $4,249,321. In the European Union, it had 1,660,901 ticket sales.

=== Critical reception ===
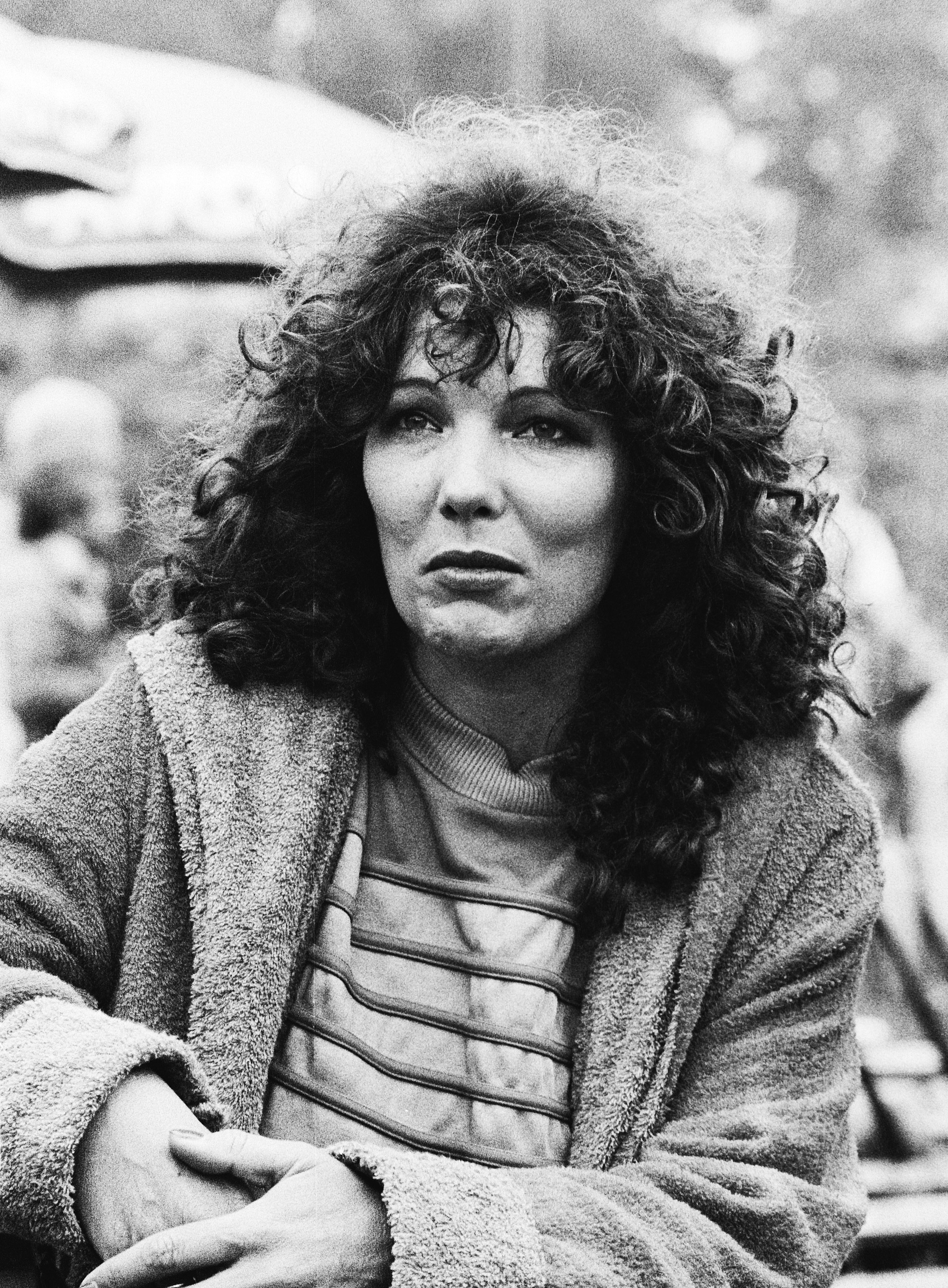
Actress Willeke van Ammelrooy received positive reviews and the Golden Calf for Best Actress for her performance.

According to Dutch director Mike van Diem, the film received more positive reviews in the United States than in its native Netherlands, saying "We thought it was a good film, but nobody thought it was that good". Dutch writer Hans Kroon suggested the U.S. reception was out of a need for escapism. On Rotten Tomatoes, the film has an approval rating of 70%, based on 53 reviews, and an average rating of 6.9/10. The website's critical consensus states: "Magical and morbid, Antonia picturesque landscapes and proficient performances elevate a somewhat pedestrian parable".

Roger Ebert gave the film four stars, saying the film showed "the everyday realities of rural life, a cheerful feminism, a lot of easygoing sex and a gallery of unforgettable characters". Emanuel Levy, writing for The Advocate, wrote "It's easy to see why" the film was winning awards in festivals, calling it "an enchanting fairy tale that maintains a consistently warm, lighthearted feel", and Willeke van Ammelrooy wonderful. Janet Maslin of The New York Times called it "a work of magical feminism". Alan A. Stone of the Boston Review called it an "astonishingly beautiful film" representing "a truce in the gender war". Kevin Thomas of the Los Angeles Times said Antonia's Line is "Beautiful, tender, hearty and poetic", and Van Ammelrooy is warm. Conversely, Edward Guthmann of the San Francisco Chronicle called the film "an odd mix of schmaltz and anti-male orneriness" and the character of Antonia a "sour pickle". Jonathan Rosenbaum of the Chicago Reader called it "humorless" "feminist rage".

In his 2002 Movie & Video Guide, Leonard Maltin called it "a treat from start to finish".

Women's studies professor Linda López McAlister commented that "It seems to me that Gorris's accomplishment in this film is to have created a sense of place and characters full of life, full of quirks and idiosyncrasies and peccadillos, full of love, and rage, and desire". Anneke Smelik analyzed the film, writing "It is Oedipal in the sense that it is about a family, but instead of featuring the triangle of father, mother and child, the film establishes a line of mothers and daughters." She goes on to write, "Female desire is represented in all of its diverse manifestations: Antonia's wish for independence, Danielle's quest for artistic creativity, Therèse's pursuit of knowledge, and Sarah's curiosity about life in general".

=== Accolades ===
Antonia's Line won the 1996 Academy Award for Best Foreign Language Film, the Toronto International Film Festival People's Choice award, and two Nederlands Film Festival Golden Calf awards. Gorris also won for Best Director at the Hamptons International Film Festival and Best Screenplay at the Chicago International Film Festival.

Award	Date of ceremony	Category	Recipient(s)	Result	Ref(s)
Academy Awards	25 March 1996	Best Foreign Language Film	Marleen Gorris	Won	
BAFTA Awards	29 April 1997	Film Not in the English Language	Hans de Weers and Marleen Gorris	Nominated	
Chicago International Film Festival	12–29 October 1995	Best Screenplay	Marleen Gorris	Won	
Chicago International Film Festival	12–29 October 1995	Audience Choice Award	Marleen Gorris	Won	
GLAAD Media Award	March 1997	Outstanding Film– Limited Release	Marleen Gorris	Nominated	
Hamptons International Film Festival	October 1995	Best Director	Marleen Gorris	Won	
Joseph Plateau Awards	1995	Best Actress	Els Dottermans	Won	
Netherlands Film Festival	20–29 September 1995	Best Director	Marleen Gorris	Won	
Netherlands Film Festival	20–29 September 1995	Best Actress	Willeke van Ammelrooy	Won	
Toronto International Film Festival	7–16 September 1995	People's Choice Award	Marleen Gorris	Won	

== See also ==
- List of submissions to the 68th Academy Awards for Best Foreign Language Film
- List of Dutch submissions for the Academy Award for Best Foreign Language Film
- Long Table
