= Liberty 5-3000 =

Character in Anthem (1938)

- Anthem character
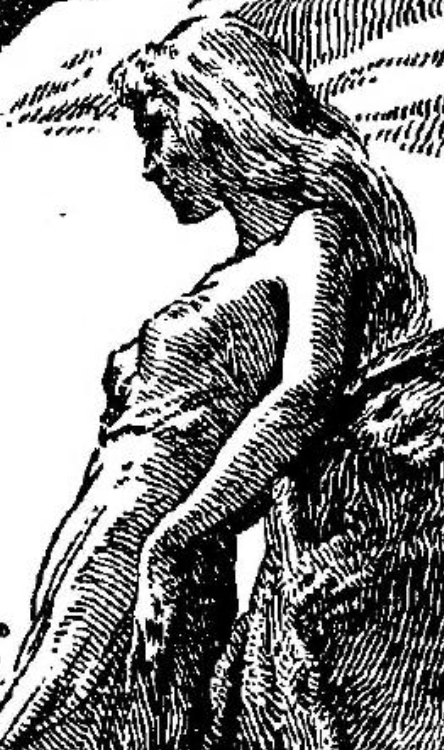
- From a Famous Fantastic Mysteries illustration by Virgil Finlay (June 1953)
- First appearance: 1938
- Created by: Ayn Rand

In-universe information
- Aliases: The Golden One; Gaea
- Position: Home of the Peasants
- Significant other: Equality 7-2521

Liberty 5-3000 is a character in Anthem, a 1938 dystopian novella by Ayn Rand that is set in a rigidly collectivistic future society that assigns formulaic names to all inhabitants. A farmer in the Home of the Peasants, Liberty 5-3000 is a "born radical" who values individuality. When she meets the narrator and main protagonist, Equality 7-2521, Liberty 5-3000 and he fall in love at first sight. After Equality 7-2521 leaves their society, Liberty 5-3000 follows him; traveling together, the two eventually move into an abandoned home from the "Unmentionable Times" before the collectivist regime came to power and relearn the word "I". The novella ends with Liberty 5-3000 renamed "Gaea" and pregnant by Equality 7-2521 (renamed "Prometheus").

In the course of revising the manuscript for publication in 1938 (and later, the 1938 edition for republication in 1946), Rand edited scenes and dialogue involving Liberty 5-3000. Compared to the manuscript, Liberty 5-3000 in the 1938 edition is less nervous. Liberty 5-3000's adoration of Equality 7-2521 in the 1938 edition is toned down in the 1946 edition.

In scholarly analyses, Liberty 5-3000 has been considered both a "spiritually unconquered" character who is on par with Equality 7-2521 and a submissive trophy wife who is ultimately passive. Liberty 5-3000's sexual intercourse with Equality 7-2521 subverts the control of the collectivist regime, and her monogamous reproductivity is distinctive in Rand's usually love triangle–laden corpus.

Liberty 5-3000 also appears in some adaptations of Anthem, including a 2011 graphic novel. In a 2013 theatrical adaptation developed by Jeff Britting, actress Sofia Lauwers portrayed Liberty 5-3000.

== Background ==
In the twentieth century, Ayn Rand was a Russian-born American author who wrote the dystopian novella Anthem, first published in the United Kingdom in 1938. Rand sets the story in a future where a collectivistic society, led by the World Council, rules earth. This collectivistic regime came to power in an event called the "Great Rebirth"; all preceding history is glossed as the "Unmentionable Times", and the state bans discussion of such. Technology and knowledge have devolved to premodern levels, and human life expectancy is around forty years. The government regulates sexuality such that women and men live separately from each other, and sexual intercourse takes place only for the sake of reproduction as part of an annual forced public activity called the "Time of Mating". Language has been changed to eliminate the first-person singular, inhibiting the ability to conceive of individuality independent of the social collective. All inhabitants are assigned names that follow a rigid formula: a single-word political slogan, a single-digit integer, a hyphen, and a four digit integer.

Set in an unnamed city, Anthem is narrated in the first person by a character named Equality 7-2521. He is a male inhabitant of this society who tries to conform despite having an individualist streak. The Council of Vocations assigns him to be a street sweeper.

== Fictional biography ==
Liberty 5-3000 is a seventeen-year-old agricultural laborer. She works in farming fields on the outskirts of the city and lives with other women assigned to farming in the Home of the Peasants. The heroine of the novella, Liberty 5-3000 is a "born radical", in the words of literary scholar Thomas Horan, and by the time Equality 7-2521 meets her, she already understands the value of individuality. Literary critic Mimi Reisel Gladstein states that Liberty 5-3000 "knows no guilt" and "project[s] a hard, glowing, and fearless quality".

The first appearance of Liberty 5-3000 is when Equality 7-2521, while sweeping a street, happens to see her sowing in the fields. Gradually, they discreetly trade silent looks, and the two of them fall in love at first sight, recognizing confidence in each other. After meeting Liberty 5-3000, Equality 7-2521 wants to save her from being forced to participate in the Time of Mating.

In their next encounter with each other, Equality 7-2521 and Liberty 5-3000 tell each other that in their minds, they think about each other with invented personal names (a practice their society forbids): Liberty 5-3000 mentally calls Equality 7-2521 "the Unconquered", and he thinks of her as "the Golden One". Before leaving, Liberty 5-3000 silently cups water from a moat and gives it to Equality 7-2521 by hand.

"We love you."

But then they [Liberty 5-3000] frowned and shook their head and looked at us helplessly.

"No," they whispered. "That is not what we wished to say."

They were silent, then they spoke slowly, and their words were halting, like the words of a child learning to speak for the first time:

"We are one . . . alone . . . and only . . . and we love you who are one . . . alone . . . and only."

— Ayn Rand, Anthem (Caxton, 1966), 86–87

When Equality 7-2521 departs from the city, fleeing to the Uncharted Forest, (Note: "Uncharted Forest" is what characters call the unmapped woods that lie outside the unnamed city.) Liberty 5-3000 follows him there. They have sexual intercourse with each other. While the two navigate the Uncharted Forest together, Liberty 5-3000 attempts to tell Equality 7-2521 that she loves him (saying "We love you") only to become dissatisfied with her declaration of love because she cannot express herself using first-person singular pronouns. Lacking natural language to communicate love as and for an individual, she must exert deliberate mental effort to express such. According to Amy Peikoff, Liberty 5-3000 "comes closest to re-forming the forbidden concept of one's own person when she attempts to express her love".

Traveling together, Liberty 5-3000 and Equality 7-2521 discover an abandoned house leftover from the Unmentionable Times. When Liberty 5-3000 finds a mirror inside the house, her reflection mesmerizes her, and she spends a long time admiring herself. By reading the texts in the house's library, Equality 7-2521 learns the word "I" and teaches it to Liberty 5-3000. She replies, "I love you". Equality 7-2521 names himself after the Greek mythological hero Prometheus, which Liberty 5-3000 affirms, and then he names her "Gaea", after the Greek goddess, because he says she is "to be the mother of a new kind of gods", and she accepts the name for herself. Anthem ends with Gaea pregnant by Prometheus while he makes plans to "raze the cities of the enslaved", in his words, and liberate independent thinkers like him from the collectivist regime.

== Textual history ==
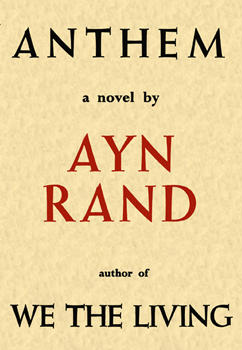
First edition cover of Anthem, the novella Liberty 5-3000 appears in

Ayn Rand included Liberty 5-3000 in her early one-page outline of the novella, planning to introduce her in chapter two. After writing the manuscript of Anthem in the summer of 1937, Ayn Rand edited the text, making changes between her draft and the text as it was published in 1938. Rand similarly introduced changes to the 1946 American edition by handwriting edits on a copy of the 1938 edition.

In the manuscript, Liberty 5-3000's eyes are described as being "as a storm cloud"; in the 1938 edition, they are "dark and hard and glowing". When Equality 7-2521 calls Liberty 5-3000 "our dearest one", in the manuscript Rand had Liberty 5-3000 react by laughing and becoming nervous. Rand changed this for the published 1938 edition to Liberty 5-3000's silent response instead.

In the 1938 edition, when Equality 7-2521 meets Liberty 5-3000, he narrates that she has "no shame" in her eyes; Rand changed this for the 1946 edition to instead read "no guilt". Rand also changed dialogue between Liberty 5-3000 and Equality 7-2521 to tone down the reverence the 1938 edition portrayed her having for him. In the 1938 edition, Liberty 5-3000 calls Equality 7-2521 "master" thrice, and each is removed in the 1946 edition. When Liberty 5-3000 professes her love to Equality 7-2521 in the final chapter, the 1938 edition has Liberty 5-3000 say "I love thee"; Rand changed this to "I love you" in the 1946 edition.

For the 1946 edition, Rand cut a scene from the 1938 edition describing Liberty 5-3000 and Equality 7-2521 fashioning clothing from the skins of animals that they hunted and killed. Rand trimmed a scene in which Liberty 5-3000 and Equality 7-2521 found a casket of jewels in the abandoned house from the Unmentionable Times; philosopher Robert Mayhew hypothesizes that Rand did so in order to make the scene more focused on Liberty 5-3000 enjoying her reflection in the mirror.

== Interpretations ==
Literary critic Shoshana Milgram Knapp argues that out of all the assigned names in Anthem, Liberty 5-3000's "stands out in a society that has no liberty", suiting the character as a heroine who later escapes this society. Philosophy lecturer Andrew Bernstein considers Liberty 5-3000 "as spiritually unconquered as" Equality 7-2521. Cultural analyst Lisa Duggan summarizes that Liberty 5-3000 "is described as an ideal Randian imperial subject".

A review in the Jackson Sun criticizes the way Liberty 5-3000 acts, writing that Liberty 5-3000 "[m]eekly . . . agrees to every suggestion made by her lord and master" and asking if Anthem implies individuality is "for men only?" According to literary scholar Thomas Horan, the ending of Anthem "reduced the once-steely Liberty 5-3000 to a frivolous trophy wife" and that at Anthem's conclusion, "her identity is equated with adornment and superficial materiality", and she is projected to "live a life of obedience to her husband". Anthropologist Susan Love Brown argues that Anthem "equates the discovery of self and reason with masculinity" and connects femininity with "passivity, and motherhood", as evident when Liberty 5-3000 "does not even pick her own name—Prometheus picks it for her".

Horan argues that Liberty 5-3000's physical description in Anthem—thin, sharp, and hard—recalls the novella's description of the masculine build of the narrator, Equality 7-2521. Liberty 5-3000's masculine beauty evokes a "queer undertone", Horan avers, such that "[a]t the heart of the novel’s philosophy of self-reliance is a masochistic love for masculinity". According to Knapp, Liberty 5-3000 is reminiscent of Kira Argounova, the protagonist of Rand's 1934 novel We the Living. Both are "strong and defiant" women with eyes described as dark or stormy who evoke "intensity and barely-controlled passion" and both leave behind their societies and lives to submissively follow the story's male protagonist.

By making sexual intimacy a forced, public activity, the World Council demeans the activity and its associated feelings. Liberty 5-3000 and Equality 7-2521 coupling in the Uncharted Forest becomes "a subversive self-expression", Younes Poorghorban and Bakhtiar Sadjadi argue, that frees them from the collectivist society's physical and mental control. The story ends monogamously, with Liberty 5-3000's pregnancy marking the beginnings of a nuclear family with Equality 7-2521 and Rand locating the eventual demise of Anthem's collectivist society in "faith in the traditional family model", Horan writes. Duggan argues that Liberty 5-3000's "monogamous and reproductive . . . romance-to-maternity plotline stands alone in Rand’s original fiction", as her subsequent writings feature childless love triangles.

== In adaptations ==
Liberty 5-3000 appears in the 2011 Anthem: The Graphic Novel (scripted by Charles Santino and illustrated by Joe Staton) as Equality 7-2521's lover. He nicknames her the "Golden One". Reviewer Greg Baladino criticized the graphic novel's "stock characterizations" and averred that Liberty 5-3000 "has no real characteristic beyond being pretty and waiting for Equality 7-2521 to give her a direction in life".

Liberty 5-3000 (left, Sofia Lauwers) cupping water for Equality 7-2521 (right, Matthew Lief Christian)

In the 2013 theatrical adaptation of Anthem developed by Jeff Britting and directed by Ann Ciccolella, Sofia Lauwers plays the role of Liberty 5-3000. She is a "courageous subversive", in the words of New York Times reviewer Ken Jaworoski, and she falls in love with Equality 7-2521 (played by Matthew Lief Christian). Theater critic Matthew Murray complimented Lauwers's performance as Liberty 5-3000, calling her "intensely committed" and "supple of both speech and manner" and lamenting that no other member of the cast "quite matches her". Jaworoski and reviewer Glenn Quentin complimented the romance performed between Lauwer and Christian. According to Jaworoski, the script constrained the performance, giving Lauwer "few chances for subtlety". Theater professor Samuel L. Leiter ribbed that Liberty 5-3000's "perfectly cut hair" and apparent "use of makeup belie her society's emphasis on denying all individuality" and criticized the acting, saying that although the actors are talented, they were "directed to behave in a… dehumanized way".

In The Anthem, a 2014 spoof musical inspired by the novella, a rebel group is known as "the Golden Ones".
