= Wiebe van der Vliet =

Dutch film editor, colorist, XR artist, and trainer (born 1970)

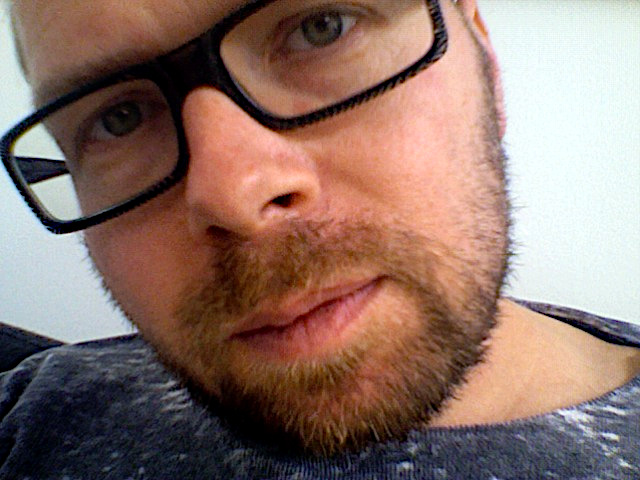
- Born: 16 February 1970 (age 56); Amsterdam, Netherlands
- Occupations: Film editor, colorist, XR artist, trainer
- Years active: 1992-present
- Website: stensakspapir.eu

Wiebe van der Vliet (born 16 February 1970) is a Dutch film editor, colorist, XR artist, and trainer based in Copenhagen. His work spans feature films, documentaries, television post-production, online video, and immersive-media projects. He has been credited as assistant editor on Antonia's Line (1995), editor of Anori (2018), and part of the creative team behind the XR project Zedna. His online work includes the video The Kuleshov Experiment: The Proof is in the Comments.

== Career ==
Van der Vliet worked on Dutch film and television productions in the early 1990s, receiving montage credits on titles including Prince Charming (1992), Vaarwel (1993), La vache qui rit? (1994), Spiegels (1996), Mensen van 2000 (1996), and Mensen van toen (1997). He was later credited as assistant editor on Marleen Gorris's Antonia's Line, which won the Academy Award for Best Foreign Language Film at the 68th Academy Awards.

In 1998 and 1999, van der Vliet worked on film material for the Anne Frank House in Amsterdam, including the original museum films, and has been credited as sound editor on Remembering Anne Frank.

In Denmark, van der Vliet worked as editor on productions including Søster (2004) and Forsvunden (2006), and as preproduction editor on Ingen kender Casper (2022). IMDb also lists later color-grading and colorist credits on Danish television productions including Alexanders krig (2023), Shaolin Heroes (2024), and LOL: Den der ler sidst (2024-2025).

Profiles published by CPH:DOX and North Creative Academy describe van der Vliet as Copenhagen-based. North Creative Academy has described him as one of the few Apple Certified Trainers in Denmark and lists teaching work at NEXT, the University of Copenhagen, Web Video Academy, and the Danish School of Media and Journalism. Older coverage also cited him as a film-editing teacher at Københavns Tekniske Skole.

Van der Vliet has frequently collaborated with director Tao Nørager under the name Roaddox. Projects associated with that collaboration include Bible Black: Five Days with Andrew Mackenzie (2011), High Before Homeroom (2010), True Family (2012), and the documentary Zusa Street (2015). Zusa Street was covered by Ekko, screened at Grand Teatret, and entered Danish library distribution through Filmstriben. Project materials additionally describe the film as having been used in teaching in Denmark.

Van der Vliet edited Pipaluk K. Jørgensen's feature film Anori (2018). The film has been described as the first Greenlandic feature directed by a woman. Before its wider release, Anori screened at the Nuuk International Film Festival in September 2018; it then premiered at Katuaq in Nuuk on 1 October 2018, toured Greenland later that year, and screened at Grand Teatret in Copenhagen in February 2019. IMDb also lists him as editor of the Greenlandic documentary Pilluarneq Ersigiunnaarpara (2019). In 2021, he was reported as one of the three nominees for FILM.GL's Innersuaq award, which that year was won by Jørgensen.

== Digital and XR work ==
Van der Vliet's online work includes the video The Kuleshov Experiment: The Proof is in the Comments, published through his YouTube channel.

In the 2020s, van der Vliet became part of the creative team behind Zedna, a Greenlandic-Danish-Dutch XR project. When the project was selected for CPH:LAB 2022-2023, CPH:DOX listed him under "manuscript and editing". The project was later covered by XR-focused industry outlets and presented in the NewImages market programme, which identified van der Vliet as one of its lead artists. His current platform for XR and moving-image work is Stensakspapir.

== Filmography ==
Selected credits
Year	Title	Credit
1992	Prince Charming	Montage
1993	Vaarwel	Montage
1994	La vache qui rit?	Montage
1995	Antonia	Assistant editor
1996	Spiegels	Montage
2004	Søster	Editor
2006	Forsvunden	Editor
2010	High Before Homeroom	Editor, producer
2011	Bible Black: Five Days with Andrew Mackenzie	Editor
2012	True Family	Editor, producer
2015	Zusa Street	Editor, producer
2018	Anori	Editor
2019	Pilluarneq Ersigiunnaarpara	Editor
2022	Ingen kender Casper	Preproduction editor
2022-2025	Zedna	Manuscript, editing; lead artist
2023	Alexanders krig	Colorist
2024	Shaolin Heroes	Color grader
2024-2025	LOL: Den der ler sidst	Grader, colorist
