= Mrs Dalloway (film) =

- Directed by: Marleen Gorris
- Screenplay by: Eileen Atkins
- Based on: Mrs Dalloway by Virginia Woolf
- Produced by: Stephen Bayly
- Starring: Vanessa Redgrave; Natascha McElhone; Rupert Graves; Michael Kitchen; Alan Cox; Lena Headey; Amelia Bullmore
- Cinematography: Sue Gibson
- Edited by: Michiel Reichwein
- Music by: Ilona Sekacz
- Production companies: First Look Pictures; Overseas Film Group; BBC Films; Newmarket Capital Group
- Distributed by: Artificial Eye (United Kingdom); First Look International (United States); RCV Film Distribution (Netherlands)
- Release dates: 4 September 1997 (San Sebastián Film Festival); 20 February 1998 (United States); 3 June 1998 (United Kingdom)
- Running time: 97 minutes
- Countries: United Kingdom; United States; Netherlands
- Language: English
- Box office: $4 million

Mrs Dalloway is a 1997 British drama film, a co-production by the United Kingdom, the United States, and the Netherlands, directed by Marleen Gorris and starring Vanessa Redgrave, Natascha McElhone and Michael Kitchen.

Based on the 1925 novel by Virginia Woolf, and moving continually between the present and the past that is in the characters' heads, it covers a day in the life of Mrs Dalloway, whose husband is a prosperous politician in London.

== Plot ==
On a beautiful morning in 1923, Clarissa Dalloway sets out from her large house in Westminster to choose the flowers for a party she is holding that evening. Her teenage daughter Elizabeth is unsympathetic, preferring the company of the evangelical Miss Kilman. A passionate old suitor, Peter Walsh, turns up, failing to disguise the turmoil he has created in his career and love life. For Clarissa this confirms her choice in preferring the unexciting but affectionate and dependable Richard Dalloway. At her party Sally arrives; once Clarissa's lesbian lover, she is now wife of a self-made millionaire and mother of five.

Intercut with Clarissa's present and past is the story of another couple. Septimus was a decorated officer in the First World War but is now collapsing under the strain of delayed shell-shock, in which he is paralysed by horrible flashbacks and consumed with guilt over the death of his closest comrade. His wife Rezia tries to get him psychiatric help but the doctors she consults are little use: when one commits him to a mental hospital, he jumps from a window to his death. The doctor turns up late at Clarissa's party, apologising because he had to attend to a patient's suicide. Clarissa stands by a window and ponders what it would mean to jump.

== Cast ==
- Vanessa Redgrave as Mrs Clarissa Dalloway
- Natascha McElhone as Young Clarissa
- Michael Kitchen as Peter Walsh
- Alan Cox as Young Peter
- Sarah Badel as Lady Rosseter
- Lena Headey as Young Sally
- John Standing as Richard Dalloway
- Robert Portal as Young Richard
- Oliver Ford Davies as Hugh Whitbread
- Hal Cruttenden as Young Hugh
- Rupert Graves as Septimus Warren Smith
- Amelia Bullmore as Rezia Warren Smith
- Margaret Tyzack as Lady Bruton
- Robert Hardy as Sir William Bradshaw
- Richenda Carey as Lady Bradshaw
- Katie Carr as Elizabeth Dalloway
- Selina Cadell as Miss Kilman
- Amanda Drew as Lucy
- Phyllis Calvert as Aunt Helena

== Reception ==
The film grossed £200,892 ($0.3 million) in the United Kingdom and $3,309,421 in the United States and Canada.

Mrs Dalloway received positive reviews from critics. On the review aggregator website Rotten Tomatoes, 71% of 34 critics' reviews are positive.
