= Keyzer & De Boer Advocaten =

Dutch television series

- Directed by: Pim van Hoeve; Diederik van Rooijen; Willem Quarles van Ufford; Anne van der Linden
- Country of origin: Netherlands
- Original language: Dutch
- No. of seasons: 3
- No. of episodes: 54

Original release
- Release: October 10, 2005 – June 15, 2008

Keyzer & De Boer Advocaten is a Dutch drama television series produced by KRO and NCRV.

The show is centered around the events in a small attorney office in Amsterdam-Zuid, Netherlands.

== History ==
The show first aired in October 2005 on Nederland 1. The show was popular with each episode being watched by almost 1.5 million people.

In season 3 this declined to around half a million viewers when the show moved to the Nederland 2 channel.

== Cast ==
Name	Role	Seasons			Episodes
Name	Role	1	2	3	Episodes
Bram van der Vlugt	Atty. Marius de Boer	22	16	16	54
Henriëtte Tol	Atty. Nina Bisschot	22	16	16	54
Porgy Franssen	Atty. Pim Batenburg	22	16	16	54
Roos Ouwehand	Atty. Hannah de Swaan	22	16	16	54
Daan Schuurmans	Atty. Maarten Lommen	22	16	16	54
Mara van Vlijmen	Simone Heling	22	16	16	54
Hans Kesting	Prosecutor Frits Oostwegel	22	16	16	54
Karien Noordhoff	Atty. Sabrina Santos		12	16	28
Lineke Rijxman	Prosecutor Marietta Klein	22	6		28
Daphne Bunskoek	Atty. Ricky van den Hoogen	22	4		26
Kenneth Herdigein	Judge Fischer	4	5	7	16
Han Kerckhoffs	Judge Haaksbergen	6	3	5	14
Cecile Heuer	Judge Hofstra	1	5	5	11
Olga Zuiderhoek	Judge Orbons	6	3	1	10
