= Ideal (novel) =

Novel by Ayn Rand

- Cover of the first edition
- Author: Ayn Rand
- Language: English
- Publisher: New American Library
- Publication date: July 7, 2015
- Publication place: United States
- Pages: 256
- ISBN: 978-0-451-47555-8
- OCLC: 915372742

Ideal is a posthumously published 2015 novel by Russian-born American author Ayn Rand.

The July 7, 2015 first edition of the novel was published featuring the book version along with the 1936 Ayn Rand play Ideal.

== Plot ==
Millionaire Granton Sayers is killed on the same evening that he has dinner with famous actress Kay Gonda. Gonda goes on the run, and both the police and journalist Morrison Pickens are searching for her. Pickens visits Gonda's publicist, Mick Watts, who is drunk and rambles about Gonda being on a "great quest". Gonda has taken with her six letters written by fans in the Los Angeles area. She visits each of the letter writers seeking their help to hide, but she is repeatedly disappointed.

The first fan, George Perkins, initially offers to hide Gonda, but changes his mind when his wife objects. The wife of the second fan, Jeremiah Sliney, is more agreeable, and they offer Gonda a room for the night. Afterwards, Gonda hears the couple plotting to turn her in for a reward, so she flees. Dwight Langley, an artist who claims in his letter to have drawn Gonda's face many times, does not recognize her when she comes to him. The next fan she visits, Claude Ignatius Hix, is very religious. He urges Gonda to turn herself in and confess her sins. The fifth fan, Dietrich von Esterhazy, says he would be honored to protect her, but then attempts to rape her.

The final fan Gonda visits, Johnnie Dawes, is the only one who lives up to what he had written to her. As they talk, Gonda repeatedly tries to destroy the admiration Dawes expressed for her in his letter. She tells him that she has slept with "every man in the studio", and suggests that he should try to exploit her for her money and connections. Dawes tells her that she has already given him everything he ever wanted from her. She tells him that she did kill Sayers, although no one else witnessed it. Dawes gives her his bed for the night. The next morning, he tells Gonda he has a plan to save her. He tells her to drive away from the city and come back the next evening. When Gonda returns, she learns that Dawes has committed suicide, leaving a false confession to the murder of Sayers. Sayers's widow reveals that her husband had also committed suicide; Gonda had nothing to do with his death.

Watts, now sober, confronts Gonda, saying she caused Dawes to commit suicide by pretending to have killed Sayers. Gonda responds that her deception "was the kindest thing I have ever done."

== History ==
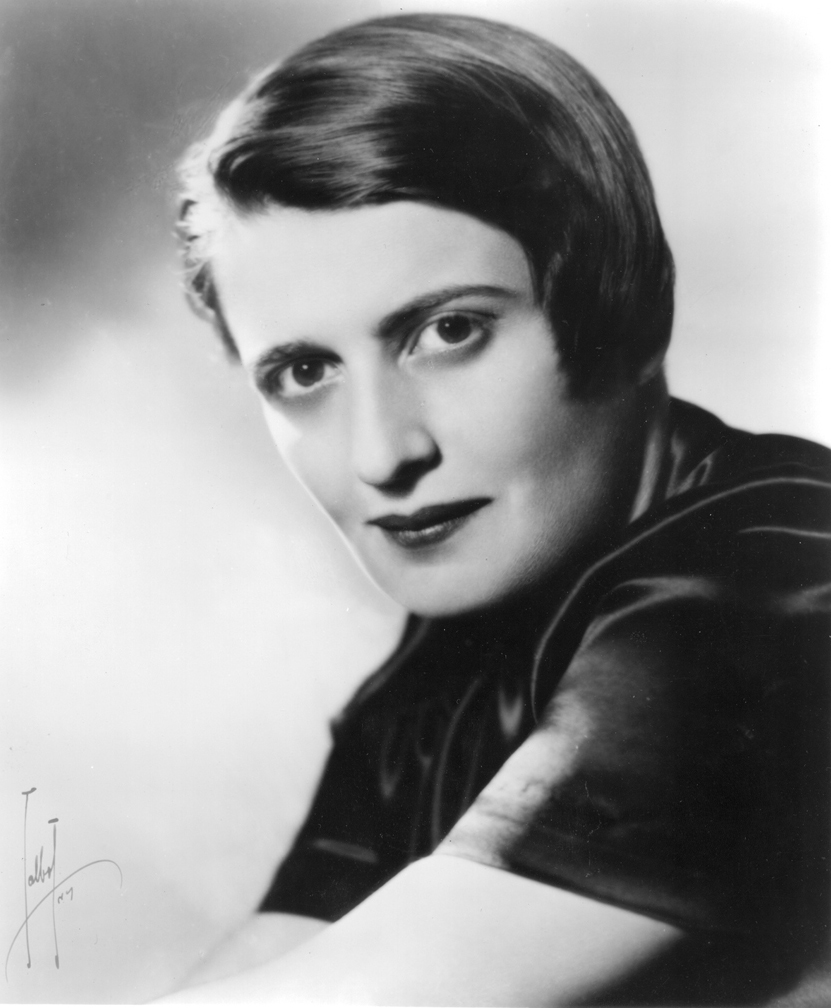
Ayn Rand wrote the novel in 1934.

Rand wrote Ideal in 1934. She was 29 and had been in the United States for eight years after emigrating from the Soviet Union, where her strong anti-Communist opinions had put her at risk. She was living in Los Angeles, where she had worked in Hollywood as a junior screenwriter for Cecil B. DeMille, and later in RKO Studios' wardrobe department. Ideal is one of several projects from the early days of Rand's writing career that were not published during her lifetime.

Rand rewrote Ideal as a play of the same name in 1936, but she was unable to find a producer for it. The text of the play was first published in 1984 as part of The Early Ayn Rand, an anthology of Rand's previously unpublished fiction, but this volume did not include Ideal in its novel form.

== Reception ==
A review in The New York Times by critic Michiko Kakutani drew parallels with Rand's other novels, saying it displayed the negative qualities of her work, including didactic speeches by characters and "contempt for ordinary people". Kakutani says the novel is "a reminder of just how much her didactic, ideological work actually has in common with the message-minded socialist realism produced in the Soviet Union, which [Rand] left in the mid-1920s and vociferously denounced." The Guardian panned the novel as poorly written and lacking dramatic conflict. In Time, Rand biographer Anne Heller said the novel displays self-righteousness and dislike for ordinary people, but not Rand's skill at embedding ideas into interesting plots. Kirkus Reviews said it was only of interest to students of Rand's writing.
