= A Question of Silence =

1982 film

- VHS cover
- Dutch: De stilte rond Christine M.
- Directed by: Marleen Gorris
- Written by: Marleen Gorris
- Produced by: Matthijs van Heijningen
- Starring: Cox Habbema; Henriëtte Tol; Nelly Frijda; Edda Barends
- Cinematography: Frans Bromet
- Edited by: Hans van Dongen
- Music by: Lodewijk de Boer; Martijn Hasebos
- Distributed by: Quartet Films (USA)
- Release date: 18 February 1982
- Running time: 92 minutes
- Country: Netherlands
- Languages: Dutch; English

A Question of Silence (Dutch: De stilte rond Christine M.) is a 1982 Dutch drama film written and directed by Marleen Gorris. It is Gorris' debut film. It stars Edda Barends as Christine M. The plot is about three women, strangers to each other, who kill a man they do not know. It was highly controversial but also highly acclaimed at the time of its release, and is now hailed as a feminist classic.

== Plot ==
Christine is a housewife, who does not speak. Her husband works while she stays home with their three children. Andrea is an executive secretary in an office predominantly run by men. Annie is a jolly waitress at a local café. These three women have never met before until one day in a dress boutique Christine attempts to shoplift a dress by slipping it into her bag. She is approached by the male owner of the store. After refusing to return the garment, Andrea and Annie join Christine in a circle around the man. Together, the three women brutally murder him as a group of women stand and silently but attentively watch.

Female criminal psychiatrist, Janine, is appointed to the case of these three women by the court to determine if they are sane or crazy. Janine takes the time to get to know each woman and their story. None of the three will say why they committed the crime, Janine comes to realize they were fed up with the strain of living in a patriarchy. After much deliberation, she concludes that they are all sane and finds herself identifying with them. Eventually tensions rise between Janine and her husband because he worries her statement in court will ruin his reputation.

The court date arrives and Janine gives her professional opinion that the three women are in fact sane and that the court should take into consideration that the owner of the boutique was a male. Despite the prosecutor's attempts to get her to change her opinion, she stands her ground. When the prosecutor suggests that the crime would have still happened if the owner were a woman, Christine, Andrea, Annie, Janine and the other women who witnessed the crime all laugh and exit the courtroom.

== Cast ==
- Edda Barends as Christine M.
- Nelly Frijda as Annie
- Henriëtte Tol as Andrea
- Cox Habbema as Janine van den Bos
- Eddie Brugman as Ruud van den Bos
- Hans Croiset as Judge
- Erik Plooyer as Officer of Justice

== Distribution ==
A Question of Silence was shown at the 1982 Toronto International Film Festival. That year it won the Grand Prix at the Créteil International Women's Film Festival and the Golden Calf at the Nederlands Film Festival.

== Legacy ==
The film was celebrated with a 30th anniversary screening at the 2012 London Feminist Film Festival, who chose it as their 'Feminist Classic' for that year. It has since been screened frequently in the UK, including at University College London in 2019 and at the Leeds International Film Festival in 2023.
