= Yevgenia Ginzburg =

Soviet writer who served an 18-year sentence in the Kolyma Gulag

- Born: December 20, 1904; Moscow, Russian Empire
- Died: May 25, 1977 (aged 72); Moscow, Soviet Union
- Education: Kazan State University

Yevgenia Solomonovna Ginzburg (December 20, 1904 – May 25, 1977) (Russian: Евге́ния Соломо́новна Ги́нзбург) was a Soviet writer who served an 18-year sentence in the Kolyma Gulag. Her given name is often Latinized to Eugenia.

== Family and early career ==
Born in Moscow, her parents were Solomon Natanovich Ginzburg (a Jewish pharmacist) and Revekka Markovna Ginzburg. The family moved to Kazan in 1909.

ID photo of young Yevgenia Ginzburg

In 1920, she began to study social sciences at Kazan State University, later switching to pedagogy. She worked as a rabfak (рабфак, рабочий факультет, workers' faculty) teacher. In April 1934, Ginzburg was officially confirmed as a docent (approximately equivalent to an associate professor in western universities), specializing in the history of the All-Union Communist Party. Shortly thereafter, on May 25, she was named head of the new department of the history of Leninism. By the fall of 1935, she was forced to quit the university.

She first married a doctor Dmitriy Fedorov, by whom she had a son, Alexei Fedorov, born in 1926, who died in 1941 during the siege of Leningrad. Around 1930, she married Pavel Aksyonov, the mayor (председатель горсовета) of Kazan and a member of the Central Executive Committee (ЦИК) of the USSR. Her son by this marriage, Vasily Aksyonov, born in 1932, became a well-known writer. After becoming a Communist Party member, Ginzburg continued her career as an educator, journalist and administrator.

== Persecution ==
Following the assassination of Sergei Mironovich Kirov on December 1, 1934, Ginzburg, like many communists (see the Great Purge), was accused of participating in a "counter-revolutionary Trotskyist group" led by Professor Nikolay Naumovich Elvov and concentrated in the editorial board of the newspaper Krasnaya Tatariia (Red Tataria) where she was employed. After a long fight to keep her party card, she was expelled from the party, officially excluded on February 8, 1937. On February 15, 1937, she was arrested, accused of engaging in counter-revolutionary activity in El'vov's group and concealing this activity. Because she was a party member throughout this alleged activity, she was also accused of "playing a double game". From the day of her arrest, and unlike most of those around her, she forcefully denied the NKVD's accusations and never accepted any role in the supposed "counter-revolutionary Trotskyist organization". As recorded in her initial interrogation, when asked whether she recognized her guilt, she responded "I do not acknowledge it. I have not engaged in any Trotskyist struggle with the party. I have not been a member of a counter-revolutionary Trotskyist organization."

Her parents were also arrested but released two months later. Her husband was arrested in July and sentenced to 15 years of "corrective labor" and his property confiscated under Articles 58-7 and 11 of the RSFSR Penal Code.

=== Trial ===
On August 1, 1937, although Ginzburg still did not recognize her supposed guilt (despite the NKVD's repeated, ruthless interrogations), a closed meeting of the Military College of the Supreme Court of the USSR (in Moscow) sentenced her to 10 years imprisonment with deprivation of political rights for five years and confiscation of her personal property. The judgement was declared to be final with no possibility of appeal. Ginzburg later wrote in a letter to the chairman of the Presidium of the USSR's Supreme Soviet that her entire "trial" took seven minutes, including the questioning and reading of the judgement: "My judges were in such a hurry that they did not answer any of my questions and declarations.". In one of the most revealing chapters of her autobiography, Ginzburg expressed great relief upon hearing the verdict, because she had feared up to that very moment that she would be condemned to death:

To live! Without property, but what was that to me? Let them confiscate it – they were brigands anyway, confiscating was their business. They wouldn't get much good out of mine, a few books and clothes – why, we didn't even have a radio. My husband was a loyal Communist of the old stamp, not the kind who had to have a Buick or a Mercedes... Ten years!... Do you [the judges], with your codfish faces, really think you can go on robbing and murdering for another ten years, that there aren't people in the Party who will stop you sooner or later? I knew there were – and in order to see that day, I must live. In prison, if needs be, but I must at all costs live!... I looked at the guards, whose hands were still clasped behind my back. Every nerve in my body was quivering with the joy of being alive. What nice faces the guards had! Peasant boys from Ryazan or Kursk, most likely. They couldn't help being warders – no doubt they were conscripts. And they had joined hands to save me from falling. But they needn't have – I wasn't going to fall. I shook back my hair curled so carefully before facing the court, so as not to disgrace the memory of Charlotte Corday. Then I gave the guards a friendly smile. They looked at me in astonishment.

=== Imprisonment and exile ===
Yevgenia experienced at first hand the infamous Lefortovo and Butyrka prisons in Moscow, and the Yaroslavl "Korovniki". She crossed the USSR on a prison train to Vladivostok and was put in the cargo hold of the steamer Jurma (Джурма) whose destination was Magadan. There she worked at a camp hospital but was soon sent to the harsh camps of the Kolyma valley, where she was assigned to so-called "common jobs" and quickly became an emaciated dokhodyaga ("goner"). A Crimean German doctor, Anton Walter, probably saved her life by recommending her for a nursing position in Taskan; they eventually married. Anton had been deported because of his German ancestry. In February 1949, Ginzburg was released from the Gulag system but was ordered to remain in the town of Magadan for five further years. She found a position at a kindergarten and began to write her memoirs in secret. In October 1949, she was arrested again and exiled to the Krasnoyarsk region but (at her request) her destination was changed to Kolyma at the last minute. No reason was ever given for this second arrest and exile. After conversion of her status from detained to exiled, she could marry Walter. The couple adopted an orphan detainee girl, Antonina, later an actress (Antonina Pavlovna Aksyonova).

== Rehabilitation and later life ==
After Joseph Stalin's death in 1953 and following Ginzburg's repeated, vigorous appeals to various authorities to have her case reconsidered, she was released from the exile (on 25 June 1955) and allowed to return to Moscow. She was rehabilitated on June 25, 1955 due to the lack of "corpus delicti".

She returned to Moscow, worked as a reporter and continued her work on her magnum opus, her memoir Journey into the Whirlwind (English title). After her husband's death in 1959, Yevgenia finished the book in 1967 but was unable to publish it in the USSR. The manuscript was then smuggled abroad and published in 1967 by Mondadori in Milan and Possev in Frankfurt am Main; it has since been translated into many languages. Eventually, her memoir was divided into two parts, whose Russian titles are "Krutoi marshrut I" and "Krutoi marshrut II" -- "Harsh Route" or "Steep Route." She died in Moscow, aged 72.

== Film ==
A Ginzburg biopic, titled, Within the Whirlwind was filmed by director Marleen Gorris in 2008. The film features actress Emily Watson as Yevgenia Ginzburg, with Pam Ferris and Ben Miller in other roles. It was released in 2010.

== Books by Ginzburg ==
- 1967 Journey into the Whirlwind. Harvest/HBJ Book. ISBN 0-15-602751-8.
- 1982 Within the Whirlwind. Harvest/HBJ Book. ISBN 0-15-697649-8.

== See also ==
- Samizdat
- Article 58 (RSFSR Penal Code)
- Aleksandr Solzhenitsyn
- Khrushchev Thaw
