= Within the Whirlwind =

- Directed by: Marleen Gorris
- Written by: Nancy Larson
- Starring: Emily Watson
- Release dates: September 18, 2009 (Gdynia Polish Film Festival); May 5, 2011 (Germany)
- Running time: 98 minutes
- Countries: Germany; Poland; Belgium
- Language: English

Within the Whirlwind is a 2009 German film directed by Marleen Gorris and based on the autobiographical book Journey into the Whirlwind by Yevgenia Ginzburg. It stars Emily Watson and Pam Ferris. Watson has described the film as "the most stretching thing I’ve done as a mature actress."

== Plot ==
During Joseph Stalin's Great Purge, literature professor Yevgenia Ginzburg is falsely convicted of anti-Soviet agitation and sentenced to 10 years hard labor in a Soviet forced labour camp. Having lost everything, and no longer wishing to live, she meets Dr. Anton Walter, a Crimea German political prisoner who is a doctor in a Kolyma gulag labor camp. He recommends her for a position as a nurse in the camp infirmary. They fall in love and, slowly, Yevgenia begins to come back to life.

== Cast ==
- Emily Watson as Yevgenia Ginzburg
- Pam Ferris as Genia's mother
- Ian Hart as Beylin
- Ben Miller as Krasny
- Ulrich Tukur as Dr. Anton Walter

== Distribution ==
As of 2011, Within the Whirlwind has not been picked up for distribution. According to Watson, "It was delivered pretty much the day the market crashed so nobody was buying anything. You have to be very Zen. Walk away and say: 'I have no idea what’s going to happen and it’s not in my hands.’ At the same time you never quite think that's going to happen."
