= Love in the Fog of the Future =

1924 novel by Andrei Marsov

Love in the Fog of the Future. The story of a romance in the year 4560 (Russian: Любовь в тумане будущего. История одного романа в 4560 году) is a dystopian novel and the only known book by the Russian writer Andrei Marsov, published in either 1923 or 1924. It is set in the distant future and has been compared to We by Yevgeny Zamyatin, which is also a dystopian love story and was written just a few years earlier in 1921 (though published in 1924).

== Themes ==
The book tackles the themes of the impossibility of attaining personal happiness and finding love under a totalitarian, socialist regime.
