= Ideal (play) =

Play by Ayn Rand

- Ad for the 1989 premier
- Written by: Ayn Rand
- Original language: English
- Genre: Drama

Premiere
- Date premiered: October 13, 1989
- Place premiered: Melrose Theater

Ideal is a play written by Ayn Rand. It follows Kay Gonda, a movie star suspected of murder, as she seeks support from various fans, most of whom disappoint her. Written in the 1930s, it was never produced or published during Rand's lifetime. Since her death it has since been published multiple times and produced twice, in 1989 and 2010.

== History ==
Rand originally wrote the story as a novelette in 1934, and revised it to a stage play around 1936. The text of the play was first published in 1984 as part of The Early Ayn Rand, an anthology of Rand's previously unpublished fiction. It was re-published in 2005 in Three Plays, alongside her plays Night of January 16th and Think Twice.

In 1989, Michael Paxton staged the play at the Melrose Theater, a 99-seat venue in Los Angeles, California. The production opened on October 13, 1989, and closed on November 19, 1989. A video of the production was released in 2004.

In 2010, it was produced as an Off-Broadway show at the 59E59 Theaters in New York. Karina Martins produced and Jenny Beth Snyder directed. It opened on June 17, 2010, and closed on July 3, 2010.

On July 7, 2015, Penguin Random House published an edition featuring the novelette version of Ideal along with the play version.

== Reception ==
The story is generally regarded as a poor fit for theater. In his preface for its publication, Rand's heir Leonard Peikoff described the play as "unavoidably somewhat static" and lacking a "developed plot structure". Ronald Merrill said it would have been better left as a novelette because it is "not well suited to the stage".

The 1989 production received mixed reviews. The reviewer for the Los Angeles Times disliked the play's "clunky structure", but complimented the staging, scenery, costumes and other elements for bringing life to the production. In Liberty magazine, the reviewer complimented Rand's writing skills and the "remarkable production design", but found the lighting and direction lacking.

The 2010 production received negative reviews from The New York Times, the New York Post, The Village Voice, and Backstage.
