= Jeff Britting =

American composer and filmmaker

Jeff Britting (born 1957) is an American composer, playwright, author, and producer.

His credits include associate-producing the 1997 Academy Award Nominee for Best Documentary Ayn Rand: A Sense of Life with director Michael Paxton, for which he also wrote the musical score. He is curator of the Ayn Rand Archives at the Ayn Rand Institute. In 2004, he published an illustrated biography of Ayn Rand's life titled Ayn Rand.
