= Michael Paxton =

American filmmaker and writer (born 1957)

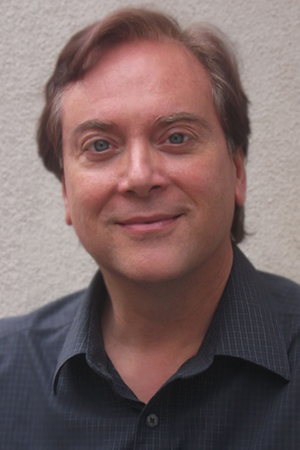
- Born: March 29, 1957 (age 69); Kingston, New York
- Education: University at Albany, SUNY (BA); New York University (MFA)
- Occupations: Film director, film producer, screenwriter, playwright

Michael Paxton (born March 29, 1957) is an American filmmaker and writer. He has directed, produced, and written several films, both live action and animated, as well as plays and books. His feature documentary Ayn Rand: A Sense of Life received an Academy Award nomination for Best Documentary Feature and a Golden Satellite Award for Best Documentary film in 1997. Paxton currently works as a multimedia producer for the Ayn Rand Institute.

== Early life and education ==
Michael Paxton was born Michael Anthony Palumbo on March 29, 1957, in Kingston, New York.

In 1975, Paxton began attending the University at Albany, SUNY, where he graduated with a Bachelor of Arts in philosophy in 1979.

He then attended the New York University Tisch School of the Arts, where he received a Master of Fine Arts in Film & Television in 1988. Paxton's graduate thesis film, Forbidden Fruit, won awards for Best Screenplay and Best Editing at the 1988 NYU Film Festival.

== Career ==
In 1989, Paxton co-produced and directed the world premiere of Ayn Rand's play Ideal at the Melrose Theater in Hollywood, and in 1991, he adapted and directed a dramatic presentation of Rand's futuristic novella Anthem. In 1995, he was the assistant director on the live-action/animated feature The Pagemaster for Turner Pictures.

In November 1996, Paxton released the feature documentary Ayn Rand: A Sense of Life. The documentary takes its name from the concept of a sense of life, a concept that Ayn Rand developed and defined as a "pre-conceptual equivalent of metaphysics, an emotional, subconsciously integrated appraisal of man and of existence. It sets the nature of a man’s emotional responses and the essence of his character." In 1997, Ayn Rand: A Sense of Life was nominated for Best Documentary Feature at the 69th Academy Awards. It also won the Golden Satellite Award for Best Feature Documentary of 1997.

Paxton also co-produced the Original Motion Picture Soundtrack to Ayn Rand: A Sense of Life and was Visual Effects Supervisor on Stuart Little 2. He was the Associate Producer on The Lion King 1½ for Disney, Bionicle 3: Web of Shadows for Miramax, and Smallville Legends: Kara and the Chronicles of Krypton for The CW.

In addition to his film and theater work, Paxton has written four books: Ayn Rand: A Sense of Life (The Companion Book) and three children's books for Disney based on classic animated features: Cinderella, The Rescuers Down Under, and The Aristocats.

== Works ==
=== Films ===
- Ayn Rand: A Sense of Life (1996), writer/director/producer
- A Place in the Circle (2000), co-director/co-producer
- Stuart Little 2 (2002), visual effects coordinator
- Ideal (2004) (V), writer/director/producer
- Bionicle 3: Web of Shadows (2005), associate producer
- Smallville Legends: Kara and the Chronicles of Krypton (2008) (V), line producer

=== Animation projects ===
- Rover Dangerfield (1991), production coordinator
- The Pagemaster (1994), assistant director
- The Lion King 1½ (2004), producer
- Roxy Hunter and the Mystery of the Moody Ghost (2007) (TV), associate producer
- Roxy Hunter and the Myth of the Mermaid (2008) (TV), associate producer
- Roxy Hunter and the Secret of the Shaman (2008) (TV), associate producer
- Roxy Hunter and the Horrific Halloween (2008) (TV), associate producer

=== Plays ===
- Ideal (1989), writer/director/producer
- Anthem (1991), writer/director/producer

=== Books ===
- Ayn Rand: A Sense of Life, The Companion Book, writer (1998)
- The Aristocats, writer (1999)
- Cinderella, writer (1999)
- The Rescuers Down Under, writer (1999)
