= Journey into the Whirlwind =

1967 memoir by Eugenia Ginzburg

- Author: Eugenia Ginzburg
- Original title: Russian: Крутой маршрут, romanized: Krutoĭ marshrut
- Translator: Paul Stevenson and Manya Harari.
- Language: English (orininally in Russian)
- Genre: Memoir
- Publisher: (English translation, 1967): Harcourt (US) Collins Harvill (UK)
- Publication date: Translation: 1967 (US and UK)
- Publication place: United States
- Media type: Print
- Pages: 332 pp (Collins/Harvill first UK edition)

Journey into the Whirlwind is the English title of a memoir by Eugenia Ginzburg. Its Russian title Krutoy marshrut can be translated as Tough Journey. Originally published abroad in translation in 1967, it was published in Russian not until the later years of the Perestroika, in 1989 in Riga.

The two-part book is a highly detailed first-hand account of her life and imprisonment in the Soviet Union during the rule of Joseph Stalin in the 1930s. Although Ginzburg sought to have the manuscript published in the Soviet Union, she was turned down. The manuscript was smuggled out of the country and later sold in many different languages. The book was published in 1967.

In the book, Ginzburg discusses her experiences in prison, where she was held for eighteen years. Throughout her time in the Gulag, Ginzburg was able to form friendships, cultivate a love of poetry and reunite with her son Vasily Aksyonov, after her release. A second volume, Within the Whirlwind, published in 1969 after the author's death, continues her story.

In the UK the translation was published in 1967 by Collins Harvill as "Into the Whirlwind" (republished in the UK by Persephone Books in 2014).

== Contents ==
The book begins in December 1934, when Ginsburg, a teacher and journalist in Kazan, hears news of the murder of Sergei Kirov. At a Party meeting several days later, she is questioned about her association with Professor Elvov of the Teachers Training Institute. In 1935 Elvov is arrested, on the grounds that his writings contain Trotskyist influences; Ginzburg is accused of failing to show loyalty to the Party by "failing to condemn" his actions. Eventually, Ginzburg is stripped of her Party membership, and imprisoned. The bulk of the book describes her eighteen years of imprisonment.
