= Marleen Gorris =

Dutch writer and director (born 1948)

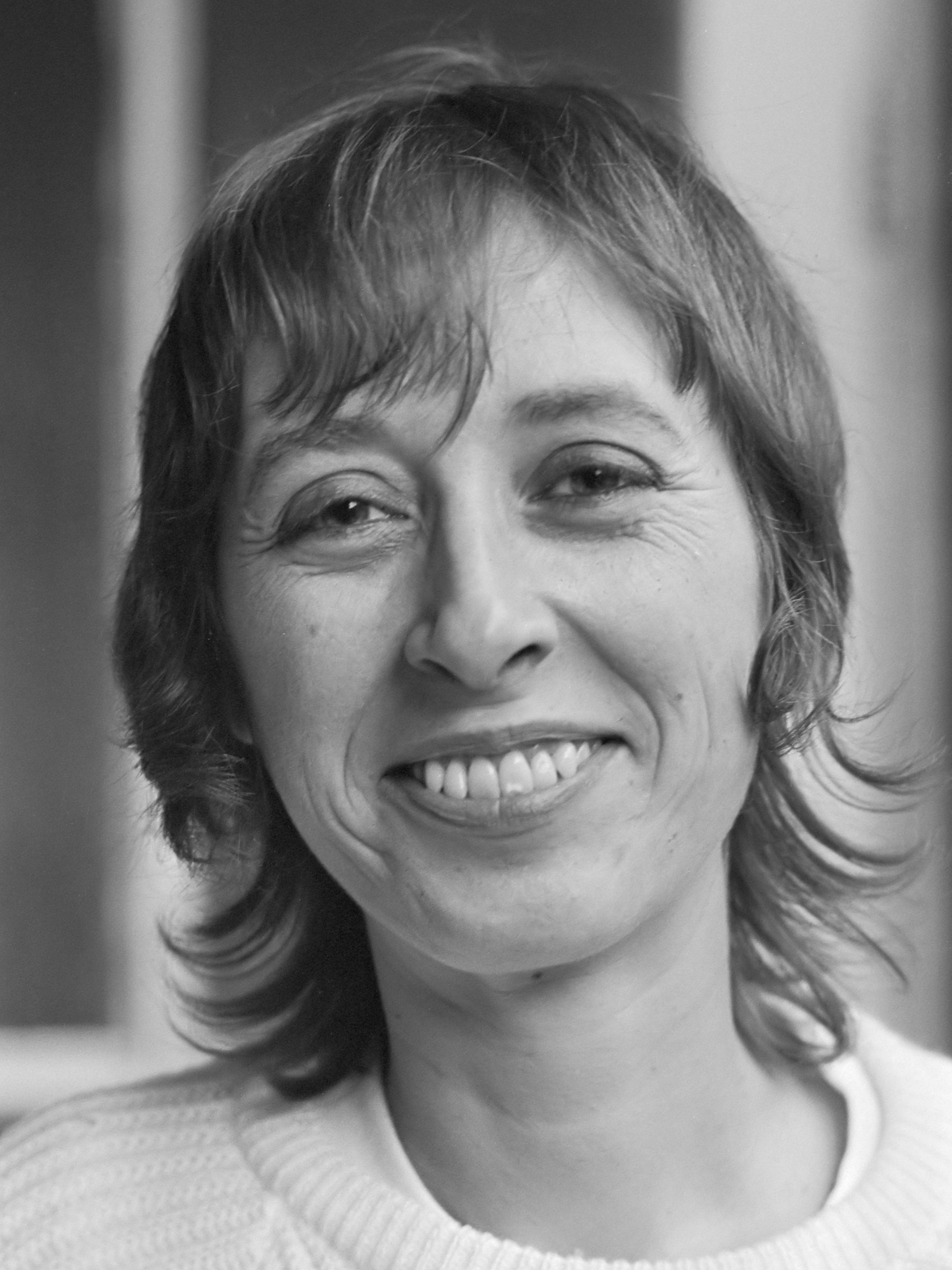
- Marleen Gorris (1982)
- Born: 9 December 1948 (age 77); Roermond, Netherlands
- Occupations: Film director, screenwriter
- Known for: Antonia's Line (1995)

Marleen Gorris (born 9 December 1948) is a Dutch former writer and director. Gorris is known as an outspoken feminist and supporter of gay and lesbian issues which is reflected in much of her work. Her film, Antonia's Line, won an Oscar for Best Foreign Language Film in 1995 making her first woman to win in this category. She has won 2 Golden Calf awards and received numerous other nominations, including one nomination for BAFTA Awards.

== Early life ==
Marleen Gorris was born on 9 December 1948 in Roermond in the Netherlands. She was born to Protestant, working-class parents in the Catholic southern part of the Netherlands. Gorris studied drama at home and abroad. She studied drama at the University of Amsterdam and has an MA in Drama from the University of Birmingham, England.

She began working as a filmmaker with almost no previous experience in the cinema and made an auspicious writing and directorial debut in 1982 with A Question of Silence. The Dutch government provided the funding to finance the project.

== Career ==
It was not until the age of 30 that Gorris began writing scripts. She took her first effort to the Belgian filmmaker Chantal Akerman, hoping to interest her in directing it. Akerman, however, told Gorris that she must make the film herself. The result, A Question of Silence (1982), caused considerable international controversy telling a story through the eyes of a female psychiatrist whose job it was to question three women who had spontaneously murdered a man casually. Some interpreted the film's feminist message to be about pent up "female rage" and dissatisfaction with a patriarchal system that boiled over the surface while other claimed it went too far and couldn't be taken seriously. The film was well received for its quality but still shocked many who watched it for its lack of condemnation of the murderers. At the Netherlands' Film Festival in 1982 she was awarded the Golden Calf for Best Feature Film for A Question of Silence, a feat she would repeat in 1995 winning Best Direction for her well known film Antonia's Line.

Soon after the success of her first film, Gorris released her second: Broken Mirrors (1984). The film hold similarities to A Question of Silence both in production and in theme though many found Broken Mirrors less impactful. Large portions of the cast and crew, including the leading women, crossed over to work on this with her. The film follows two parallel plots. The first of women working in a brothel called Club Happy House and the second of a woman kidnapped and starved to death by an unnamed man for his pleasure. Broken Mirrors explores female viewpoint and experiences just like A Question of Silence, though this time with a larger focus on the oppressive nature of the patriarchy and power dynamics within it. The ending of the film proposed that a defense against these powers are unity and solidarity among women though this sentiment did not resonate for everyone. She did not make another film until The Last Island (1990). The film yet again tells a story of violence where a group of plane crash survivors are marooned on an island; the men turn on each other until only the two women remain alone and stranded.

In 1995, Gorris had her greatest international success to-date with Antonia's Line. Starring Willeke van Ammelrooy, the story of an independent woman and her female descendants was not as radical as the director's previous work, although a number of critics complained that the most male characters in the film were portrayed as either ineffectual idiots and with obviously secondary roles. However, critical support for the film was overwhelming, and it was honored with a number of international awards, including a Golden Calf and an Academy Award for Best Foreign Film.

Her next film was Mrs Dalloway (1997), based on the novel by Virginia Woolf, with a cast that included Vanessa Redgrave, Natascha McElhone, and Rupert Graves. It earned a number of international honors, including an Evening Standard British Film Award. She followed this movie with The Luzhin Defence (2000), based on a novel by Vladimir Nabokov. Starring John Turturro and Emily Watson, it tells the story of the love affair between an eccentric chess champion and a strong-willed society woman. Carolina (2003), starring Julia Stiles, Shirley MacLaine, and Alessandro Nivola, was released direct-to-video in 2005.

Gorris's 2009 film Within the Whirlwind, starring Emily Watson, was not picked up for distribution. According to Watson, "It was delivered pretty much the day the market crashed so nobody was buying anything."

In June 2017, Gorris announced she had retired from making films. Two years prior, she was diagnosed with a burnout after she had collapsed while on set shooting Tulipani, Love, Honour and a Bicycle. Mike van Diem, like Gorris an Academy Award for Best Foreign Film winner, would later take over as director.

== Style and Themes ==
Gorris often tackles similar themes with her films including, but not limited to; feminist critique of the patriarchy, female community and solidarity, violence as a metaphor, allegorical settings, and genre subversion. Much of her style roots in Gorris's need to question the patriarchy. She blends realism with metaphor, using allegories, sometimes even fables, to handle real world issues through pallatable plots within her films.

== Legacy ==
In 2012 the London Feminist Film Festival chose A Question of Silence as their 'Feminist Classic' and celebrated it with a 30th anniversary screening of the film. It has since been screened frequently in the UK, most recently at University College London University College London in 2019 and at the Leeds International Film Festival in 2023. By not only being the first woman to win an Academy Award for Best Foreign Language Film, but also winning such an award with an allegorical feminist film that represents queer people, has left a difinitive mark on the world of film.

== Personal life ==
Marleen Gorris came out as a lesbian after the success of Antonia's Line. Her partner, Maria Uitdehaag, served in its production as first assistant director, and was mentioned by Gorris in her Academy Award acceptance speech.

== Filmography ==
=== Film ===
Year	Title	Director	Producer	Writer	Notes
1982	A Question of Silence (De stilte rond Christine M.)	Yes		Yes	Golden Calf for Best Film
1984	Broken Mirrors (Gebroken spiegels)	Yes		Yes	
1990	The Last Island	Yes		Yes	
1995	Antonia's Line (Antonia)	Yes		Yes	
1997	Mrs Dalloway	Yes			Evening Standard British Film Award for Best Screenplay
2000	The Luzhin Defence	Yes			
2003	Carolina	Yes			
2009	Within the Whirlwind	Yes			
2017	Tulipani, Love, Honour and a Bicycle	Uncredited			

=== Television ===
Year	Title	Director	Producer	Writer	Notes
1983	De geest van gras (The Spirit of Grass)	Yes			TV movie
1993	Verhalen van de straat (Stories of the Street)	Yes		Yes	5 episodes
2007	The L Word	Yes			Episode: "Livin' La Vida Loca"
2011	Rembrandt en ik (Rembrandt and Me)	Yes		Yes	Director: 4 episodes; Writer: 1 episode

== Awards and nominations ==
Year	Award	Category	Work	Result	Notes
2001	Golden Aphrodite, Love is Folly International Film Festival, Bulgaria	Golden Aphrodite	The Lezhin Defense	Won	
2000	Audience Award, Cinefest Sudbury	Audience Award	The Lezhin Defense	Won	
1997	Golden Sea Shell, San Sebastian International Film Festival	Best film	Mrs. Dalloway	Nominated	
1997	BAFTA	Best Film Not in the English Language	Antonia's Line	Nominated	
1997	Silver Condor, Argentinean Film Critics Association Awards	Best Foreign Film	Antonia's Line	Nominated	
1996	Audience Award, Warsaw International Film Festival	Audience Award	Antonia's Lines	Nominated	
1995	Golden Calf	Best Director of a Feature Film	Antonia's Line	Won	
1995	Silver Hugo, Chicago International Film Festival	Best Screenplay	Antonia's Line	Won	
1995	Academy Awards	Academy Award for Best International Feature Film	Antonia's Line	Won	
1995	People's Choice Award, Toronto International Film Festival	Best Film	Antonia's Line	Won	
1995	Golden Spike, Valladolid International Film Festival		Antonia's Lines	Nominated	
1987	Audience Award, Warsaw Film Festival		Broken Mirrors		
1985	Gold Hugo, Chicago International Film Festival		Broken Mirrors	Nominated	
1985	Audience Award, Netherlands Film Festival		Broken Mirrors	Won	
1985	Audience Award, San Francisco Lesbian and Gay Film Festival		Broken Mirrors	Won	
1982	Golden Charbdis, Taormina International Film Festival		A Question of Silence	Nominated	
1982	Bronze Charybdis, Taormina International Film Festival		A Question of Silence	Won	
1982	Grand Prix, Créteil Women's Film Festival		A Question of Silence	Won	
1982	Gold Hugo, Chicago International Film Festival		A Question of Silence	Nominated	
1982	Golden Calf	Best Film	A Question of Silence (De stilte rond Christine M.)	Won	

== See also ==
- List of female film and television directors
- List of lesbian filmmakers
- List of LGBT-related films directed by women
