= Henriëtte Tol =

Dutch actress

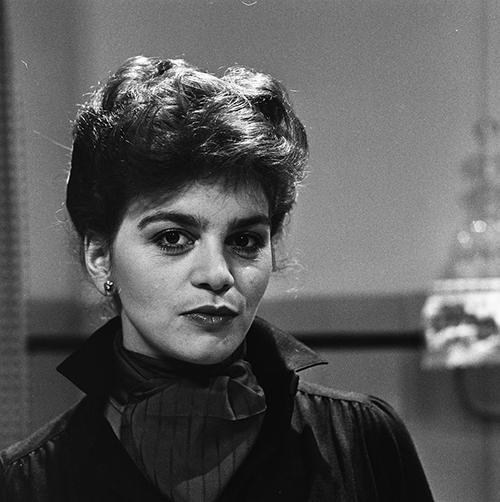
- Occupation: Actress

Henriëtte Tol is a Dutch actress. She is known for her roles as Conny de Graaf in television series Westenwind, Nina Bisschot in Keyzer & De Boer Advocaten and as Karin Alberts in the soap opera Goede tijden, slechte tijden.

She also appeared as Queen Wilhelmina of the Netherlands the musical Soldier of Orange.
