= Judgment Day: My Years with Ayn Rand =

Memoir by Nathaniel Branden (1989; rev. 1999)

My Years with Ayn Rand
- Cover of the first edition
- Author: Nathaniel Branden
- Language: English
- Subjects: Nathaniel Branden; Ayn Rand
- Publisher: Houghton Mifflin (1st edition); Jossey-Bass (revised edition)
- Publication date: 1989 (1st edition); 1999 (revised edition)
- Publication place: United States
- Media type: Print (Hardcover and Paperback)
- Pages: 436 (1st edition)
- ISBN: 0-395-46107-3 (1st edition); ISBN 0-7879-4513-7 (revised edition)
- OCLC: 581085790

Judgment Day: My Years with Ayn Rand is a 1989 memoir by psychologist Nathaniel Branden that focuses on his relationship with his former mentor and lover, Ayn Rand. Branden released a revised version, retitled as My Years with Ayn Rand, in 1999.

== Background ==
Nathaniel Branden met Ayn Rand in 1950 and was her close associate for 18 years. He and his wife, Barbara Branden, were leading figures in the Objectivist movement based on Rand's philosophy of Objectivism, and they operated the Nathaniel Branden Institute to promote Objectivism. In 1954, Rand began an extramarital affair with Nathaniel Branden. The breakdown of Rand's relationship with Nathaniel Branden in 1968 coincided with the closure of the Nathaniel Branden Institute and the expulsion of both Nathaniel and Barbara Branden from Rand's circle. In 1986, Barbara Branden published The Passion of Ayn Rand, a biography of Rand that made the first public revelation of the affair between Rand and Nathaniel Branden.

== Reception ==
In a review for The New York Times, Susan Brownmiller said the memoir was "an embarrassing venture" that included "a massive dose of psychobabble". In a review for National Review, Joseph Sobran described Branden as having "a layer of California psychobabble" and said, "At times he is rough on himself, but not nearly rough enough." A review in The Blade of Toledo said the book offered "interesting glimpses of Ayn Rand and her life", but also said, "It is noticeable that in most situations Branden emerges on the side of right, or at least lesser evil."

Liberty magazine editor R. W. Bradford called the book a "valuable work" that "provides hitherto unpublished details" about Branden's relationship with Rand, but said it provided an "unflattering self-portrait" of Branden that made Bradford more sympathetic towards Rand. He also complained that Branden's discussions of his former associates in the Objectivist movement sometimes showed "cruelty" and "contempt" toward them.

The book was also reviewed in such publications as the Los Angeles Times, The Washington Post, Chronicles, and Kirkus Reviews.

== Revised edition ==
In the 1999 revised edition, Branden says he updated the book both to add and remove material, as well as to correct "factual errors" and "unintended and misleading implications" from the first edition. He also hoped "to present a more balanced portrait of certain people with whom my relationships were at times adversarial."
