= The Passion of Ayn Rand (film) =

- DVD cover
- Genre: Biographical drama
- Based on: The Passion of Ayn Rand by Barbara Branden
- Screenplay by: Howard Korder; Mary Gallagher
- Directed by: Christopher Menaul
- Starring: Helen Mirren; Eric Stoltz; Julie Delpy; Peter Fonda
- Music by: Jeff Beal
- Country of origin: United States
- Original language: English

Production
- Executive producers: Irwin Meyer; Marilyn Lewis
- Producers: Peter Crane; Linda Curran Wexelblatt
- Cinematography: Ron Orieux
- Editor: David Martin
- Running time: 104 minutes
- Production company: Producers Entertainment Group

Original release
- Network: Showtime
- Release: January 27, 1999

The Passion of Ayn Rand is a 1999 American biographical drama television film directed by Christopher Menaul and written by Howard Korder and Mary Gallagher, based on the 1986 book of the same name by Barbara Branden.

The film stars Helen Mirren as philosopher and novelist Ayn Rand, who engages in an affair with Nathaniel Branden, played by Eric Stoltz, a psychologist who is 25 years younger than she is. Branden built up an institute to spread Rand's ideas, but the two eventually had a falling-out. The film also stars Julie Delpy as Branden's wife Barbara and Peter Fonda as Rand's husband Frank O'Connor.

The Passion of Ayn Rand premiered at the Sundance Film Festival on January 27, 1999, and aired on Showtime on May 30, 1999. It received moderately positive reviews from critics.

== Cast ==
- Helen Mirren as Ayn Rand
- Eric Stoltz as Nathaniel Branden
- Julie Delpy as Barbara Branden
- Peter Fonda as Frank O'Connor
- Sybil Darrow as Caroline
- Tom McCamus as Richard
- Don McKellar as Alfred
- Donald Carrier as David
- Katherine Trowell as Woman at funeral
- Tomas Chovanec as First student
- Patrick Garrow as Second student
- Sergio Di Zio as Fifth student
- Hakan Coskuner as Florist

== Production ==
Filming took place in Toronto.

== Release ==
The film premiered at the Sundance Film Festival on January 27, 1999. It aired on Showtime on May 30, 1999.

== Reception ==
=== Critical reception ===
Based on reviews collected by Rotten Tomatoes, the film has an overall approval rating from critics of 80%, with an average score of 6.8/10. Writing in Variety, David Kronke called the film "an ambitious, visually sumptuous attempt to depict a bizarre element of a controversial personality's life". Kronke went on to say, "Unfortunately, its insistence on maintaining a detached point of view towards its characters – or, rather, no point of view at all, as the filmmakers seem reticent to offend either Rand fans or detractors – renders it dramatically inert."

=== Awards and nominations ===
Year	Award	Category	Nominee	Result
1999	Emmy Awards	Outstanding Lead Actress in a Miniseries or a Movie	Helen Mirren	Won
1999	Emmy Awards	Outstanding Supporting Actor in a Miniseries or a Movie	Peter Fonda	Nominated
2000	Golden Globe Awards	Best Performance by an Actor in a Supporting Role in a Series, Mini-Series or Motion Picture Made for TV	Peter Fonda	Won
2000	Golden Globe Awards	Best Performance by an Actress in a Mini-Series or Motion Picture Made for TV	Helen Mirren	Nominated
2000	PGA Awards	Television Producer of the Year Award in Longform	Peter Crane, Linda Curran Wexelblatt, Marilyn Lewis, Irwin Meyer, Steven Hewitt	Nominated
2000	Screen Actors Guild Awards	Outstanding Performance by a Female Actor in a Television Movie or Miniseries	Helen Mirren	Nominated
2000	Screen Actors Guild Awards	Outstanding Performance by a Male Actor in a Television Movie or Miniseries	Peter Fonda	Nominated
