= Actor Award for Outstanding Performance by a Female Actor in a Television Movie or Limited Series =

American award for acting in television

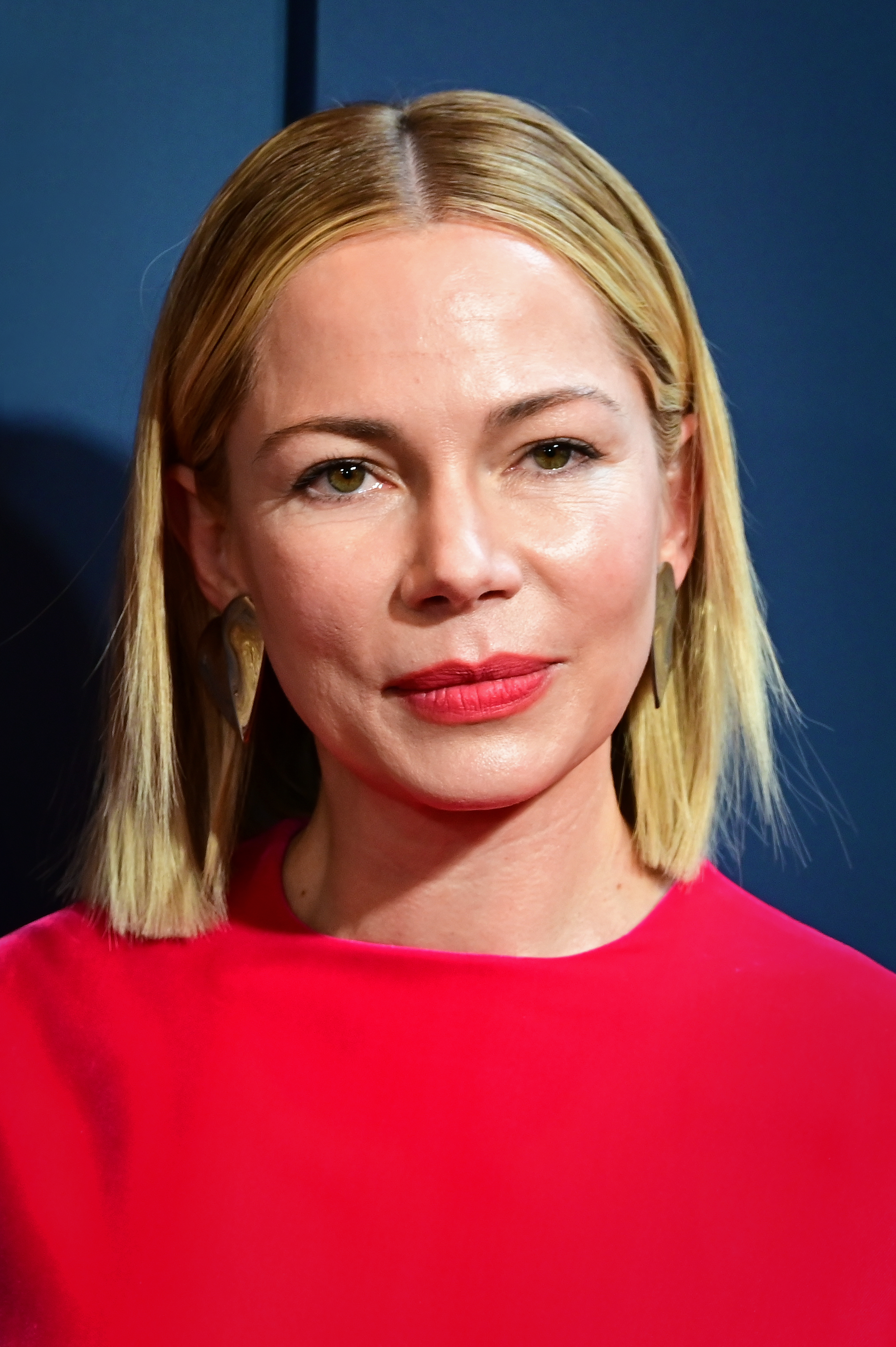
- Awarded for: Outstanding Performance by a Female Actor in a Television Movie or Limited Series
- Location: Los Angeles, California
- Presented by: SAG-AFTRA
- Currently held by: Michelle Williams for Dying for Sex (2025)
- Website: sagawards.org

The Actor Award for Outstanding Performance by a Female Actor in a Television Movie or Limited Series is an award given by the Screen Actors Guild to honor the finest acting achievements in a television movie or limited series.

In this category five actors have received two awards each: Helen Mirren (Elizabeth I, Phil Spector), Queen Latifah (Life Support, Bessie), Kate Winslet (Mildred Pierce, Mare of Easttown), Alfre Woodard (The Piano Lesson, Miss Evers' Boys) and Michelle Williams (Fosse/Verdon, Dying For Sex)

The actress with the most nominations in this category is Helen Mirren with five for her roles in The Passion of Ayn Rand, Door to Door, The Roman Spring of Mrs. Stone, Elizabeth I, and Phil Spector).

== Winners and nominees ==
indicates the winner.

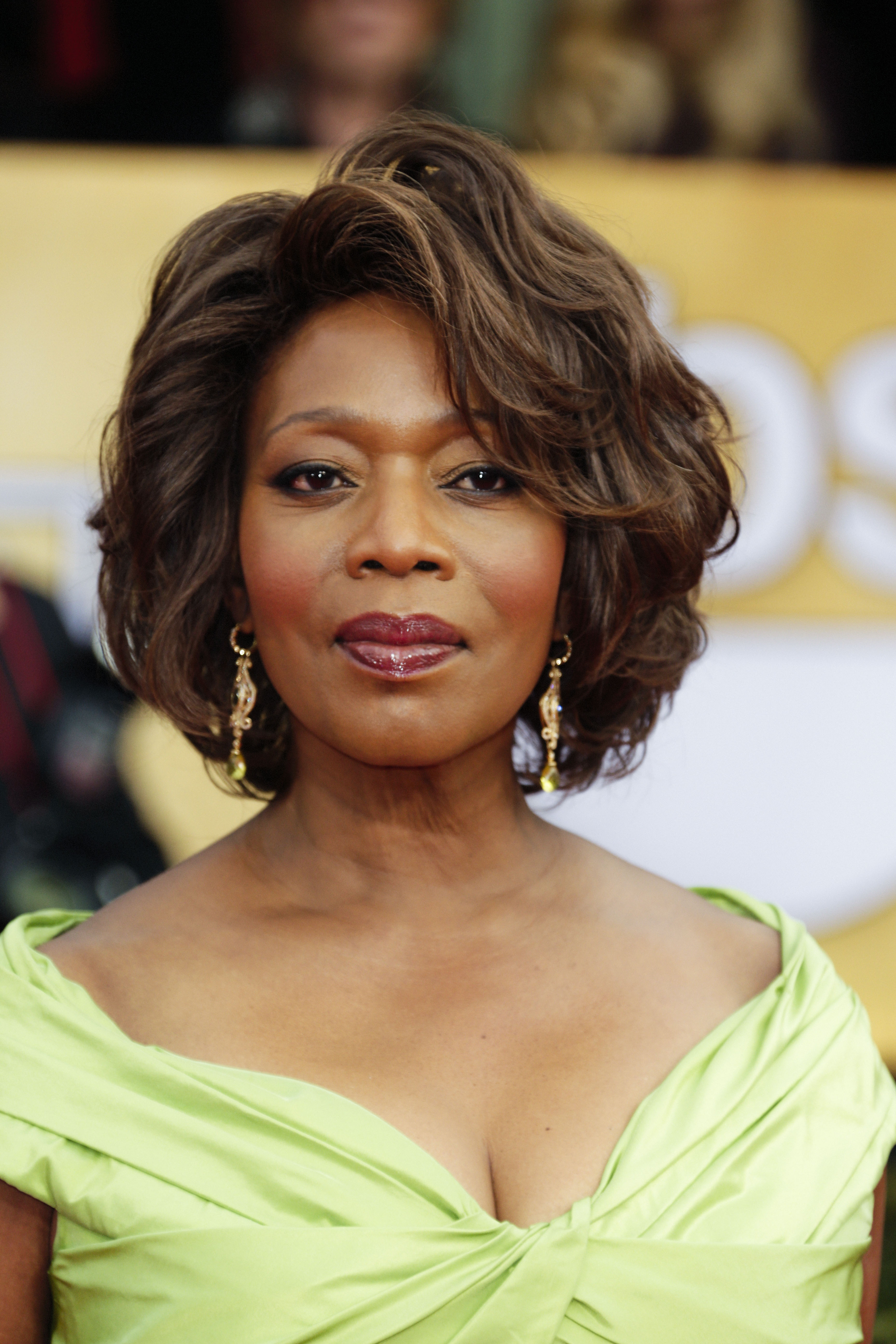
Alfre Woodard won twice in this category for The Piano Lesson (1995) and Miss Evers' Boys (1997)

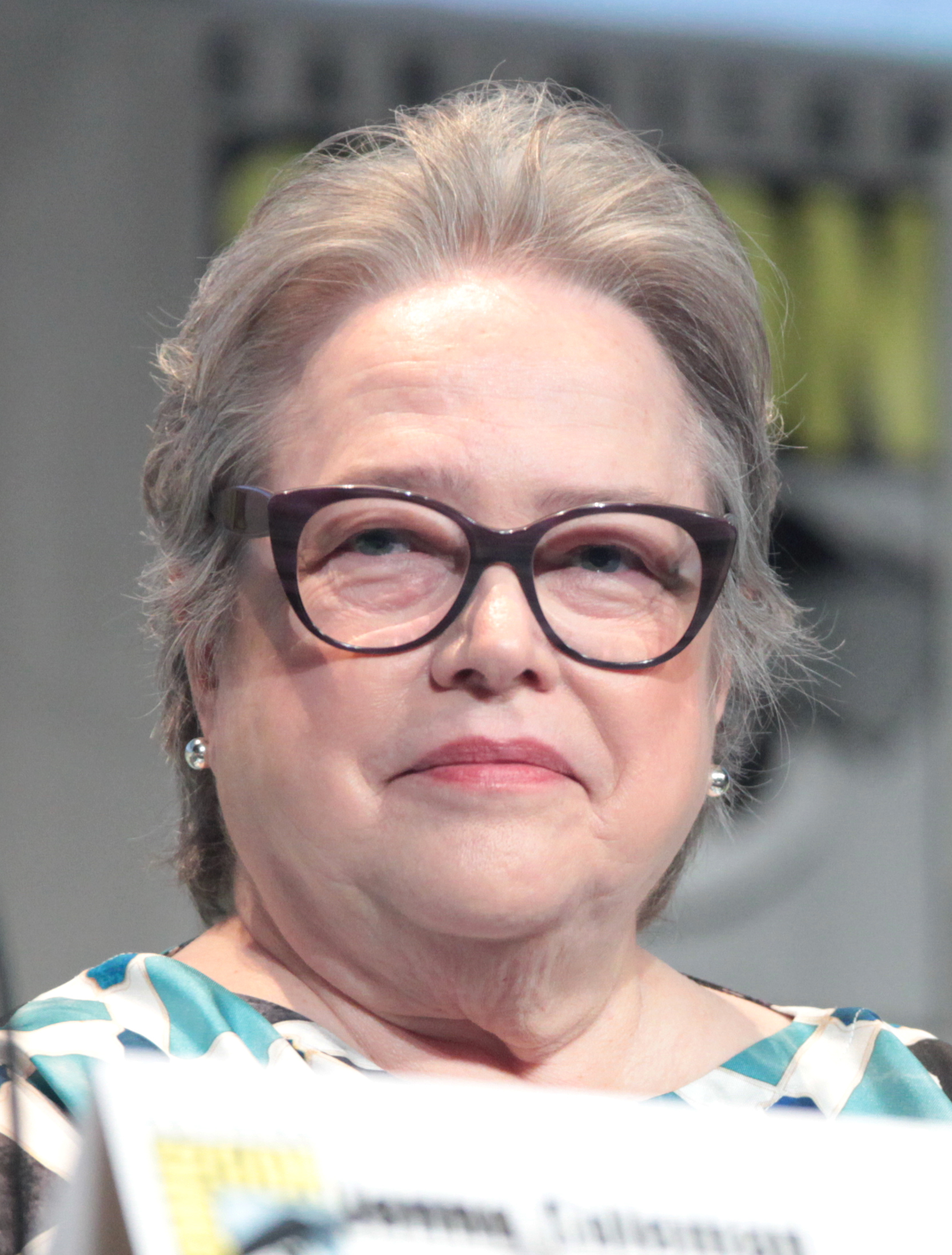
Kathy Bates won for The Late Shift (1996)

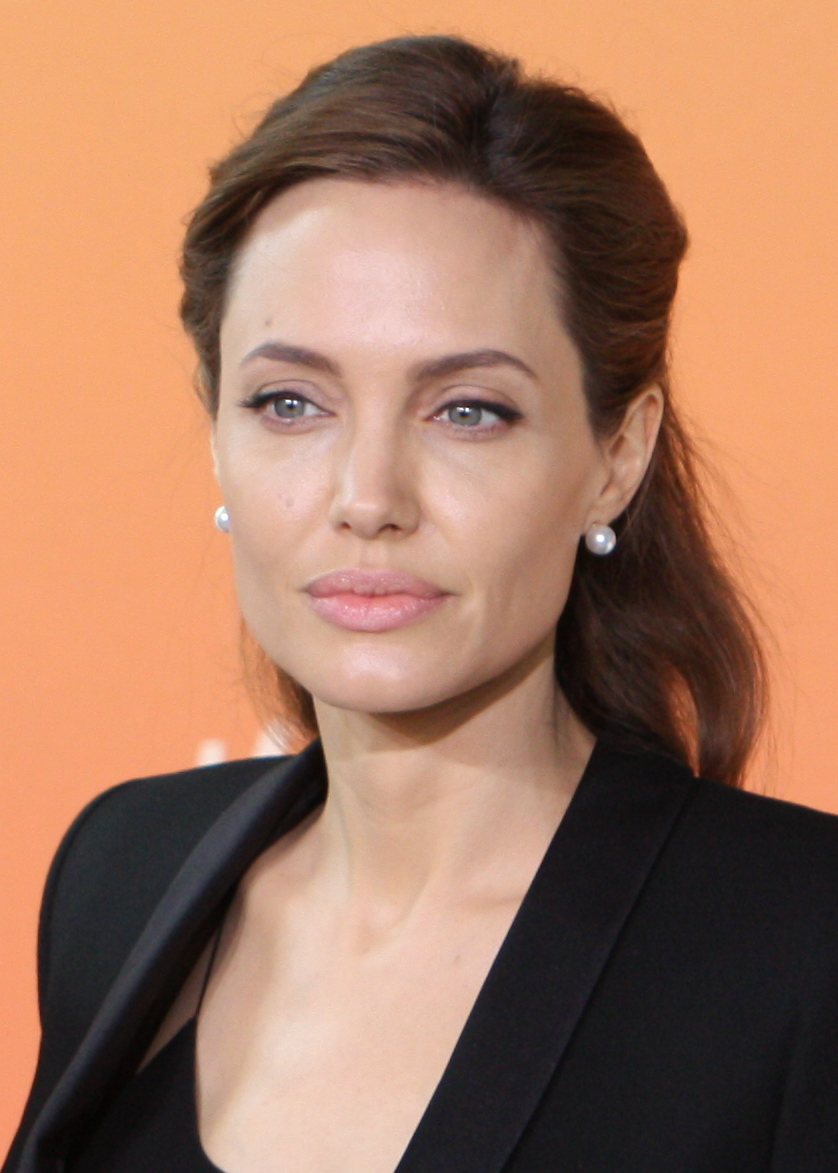
Angelina Jolie won for Gia (1998)

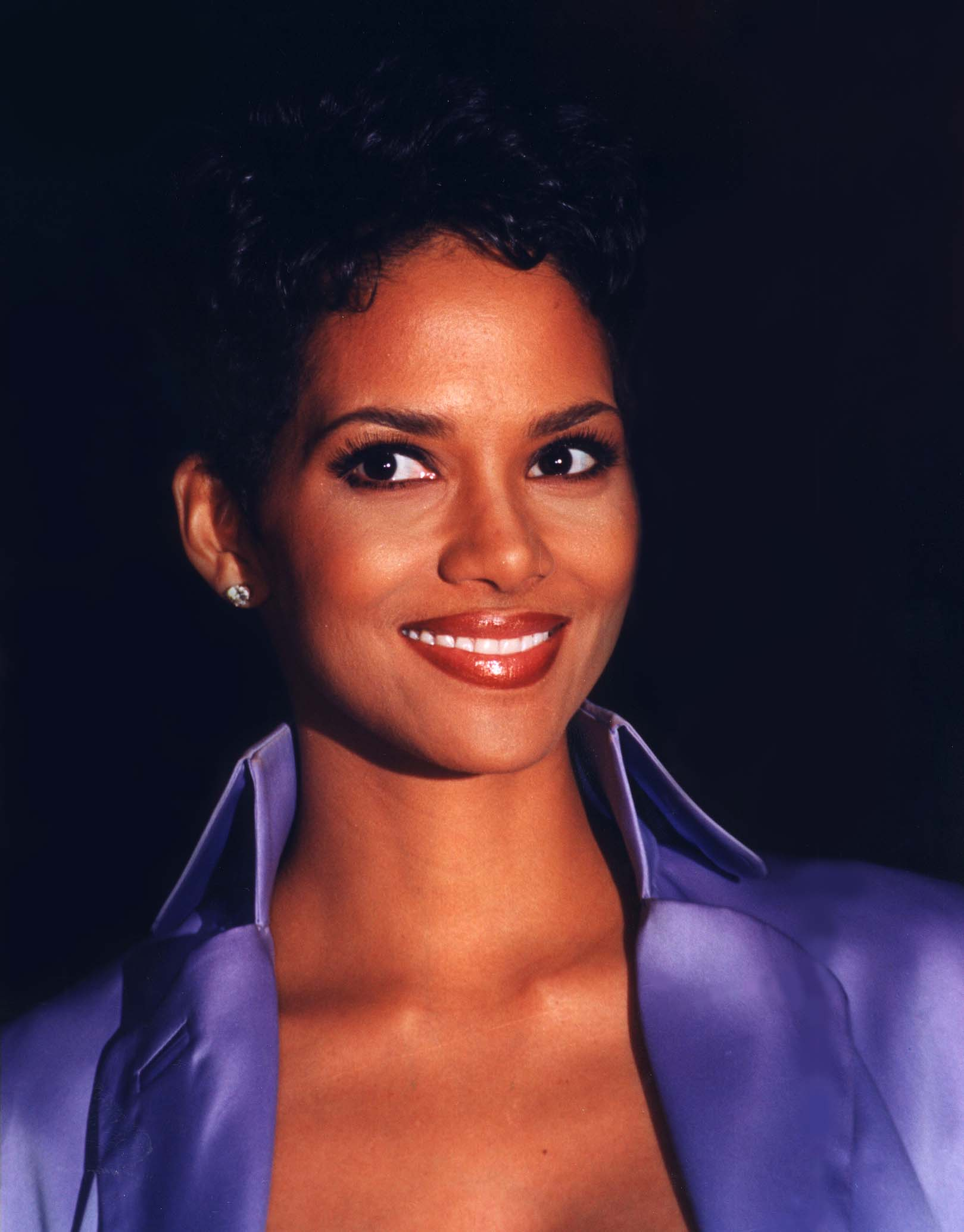
Halle Berry won for Introducing Dorothy Dandridge (1999)

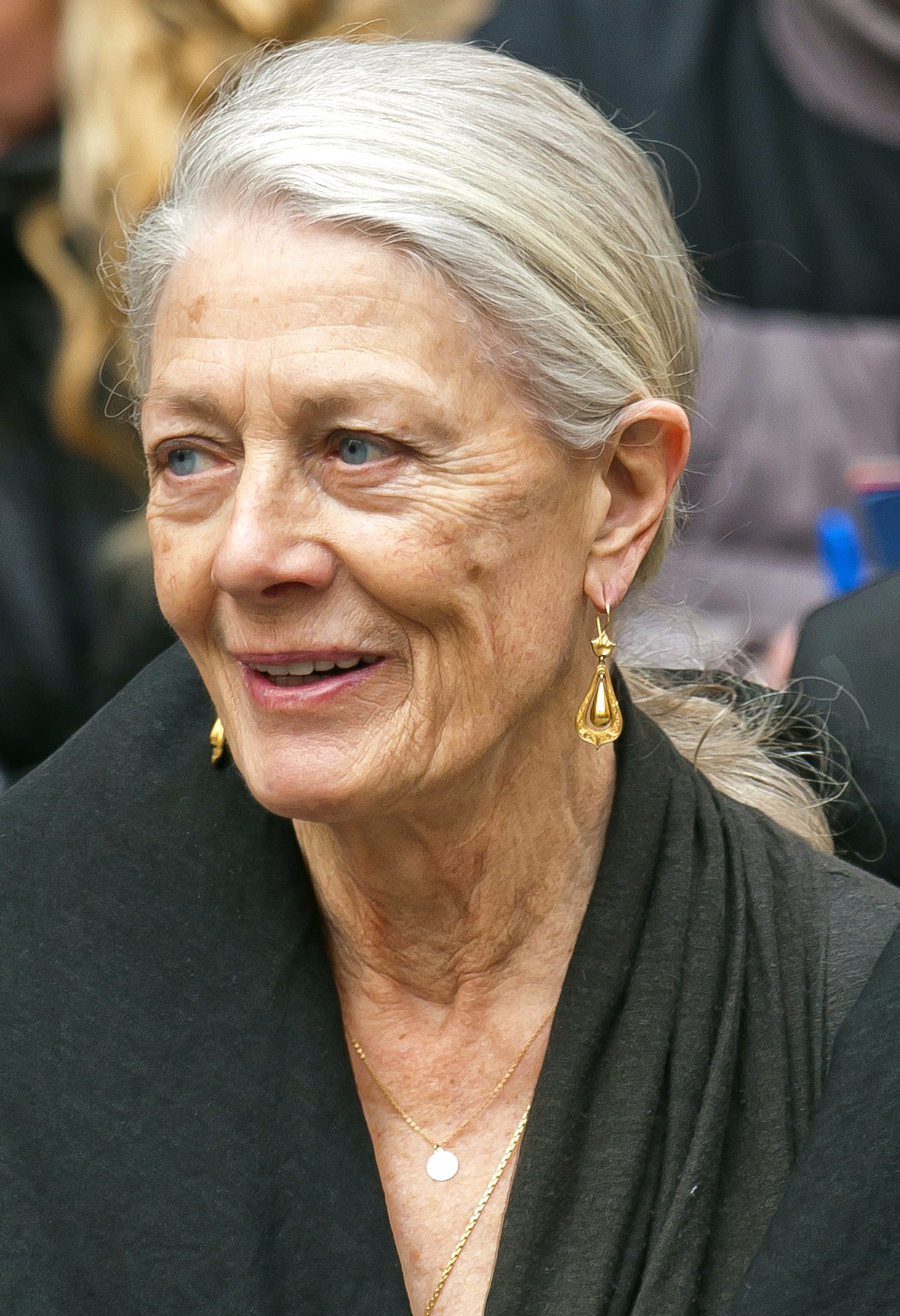
Vanessa Redgrave won for If These Walls Could Talk 2 (2000)

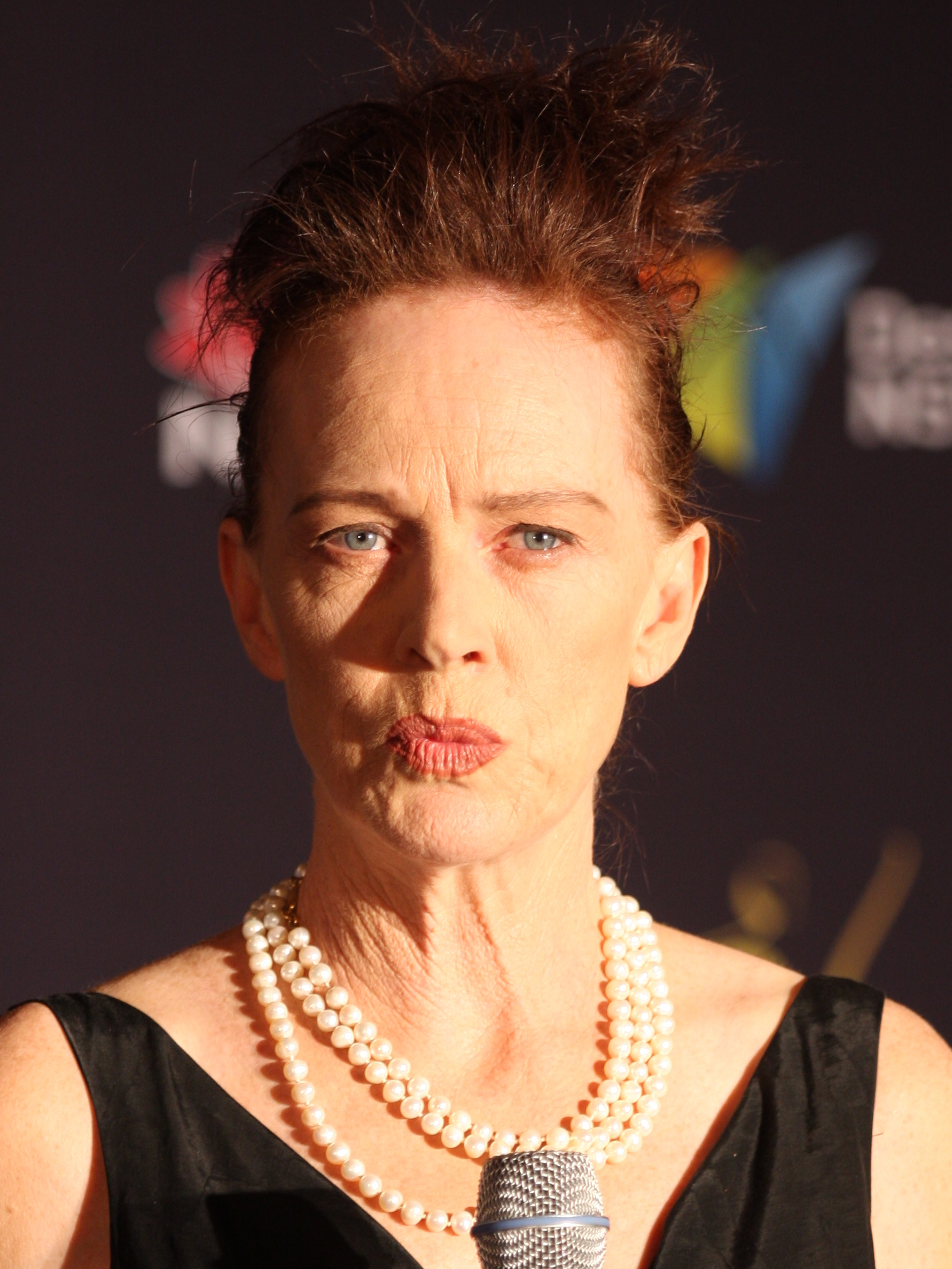
Judy Davis won for Life with Judy Garland: Me and My Shadows (2001)

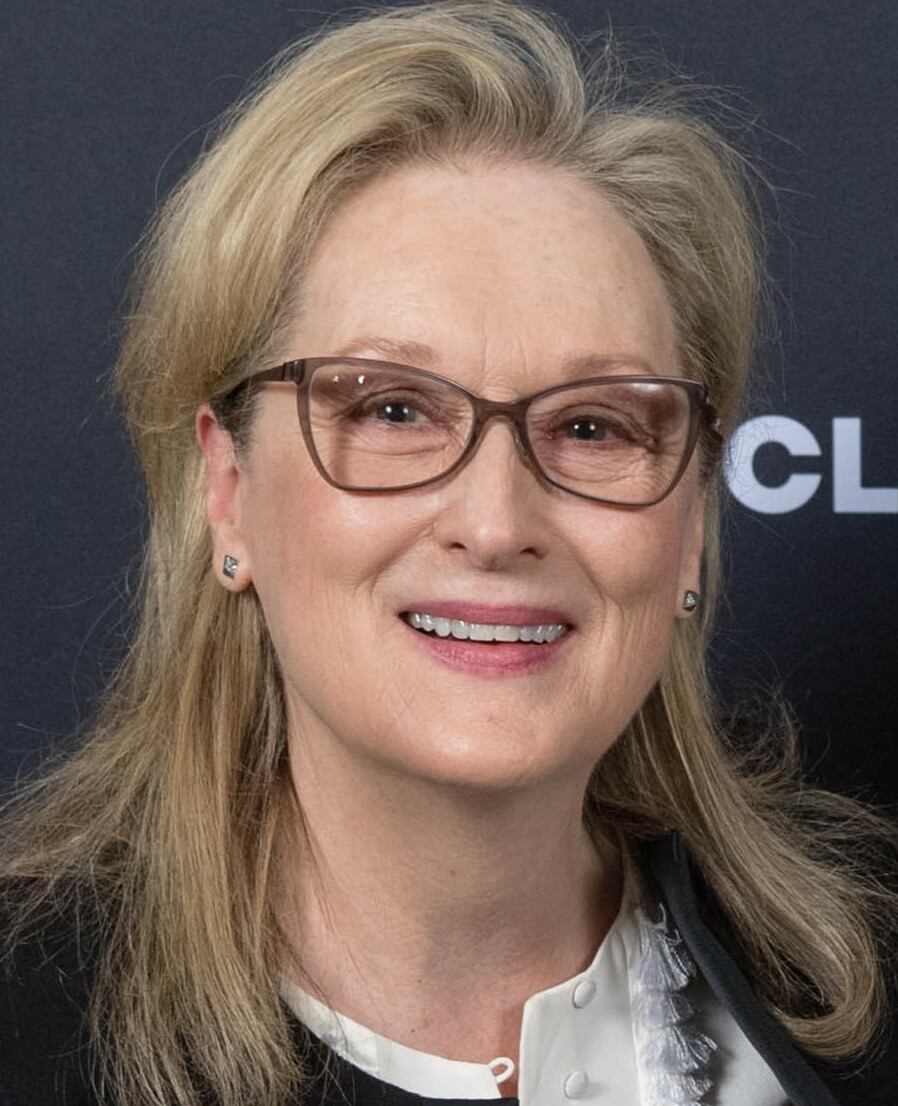
Meryl Streep won Angels in America (2003)

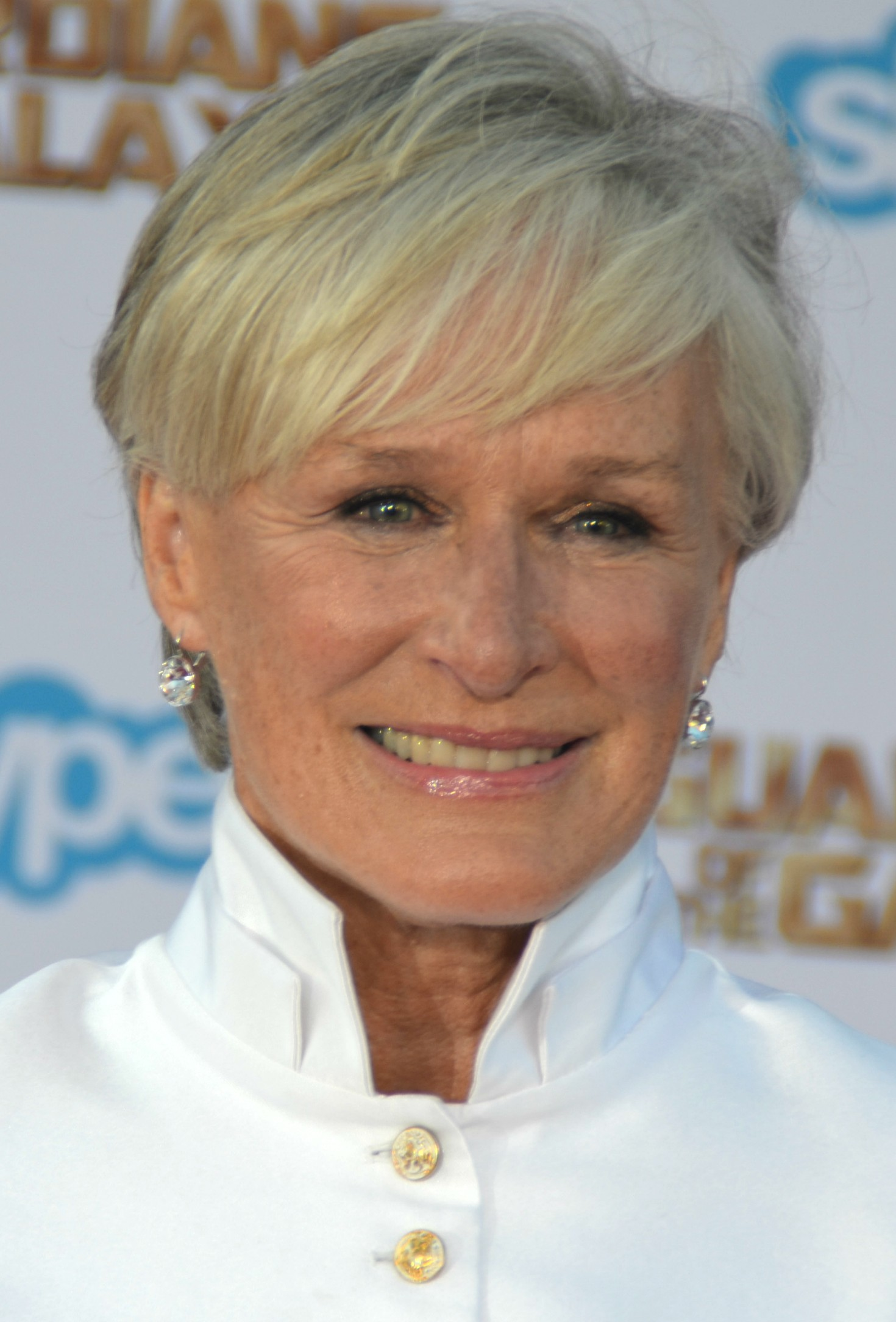
Glenn Close won for The Lion in Winters (2004)

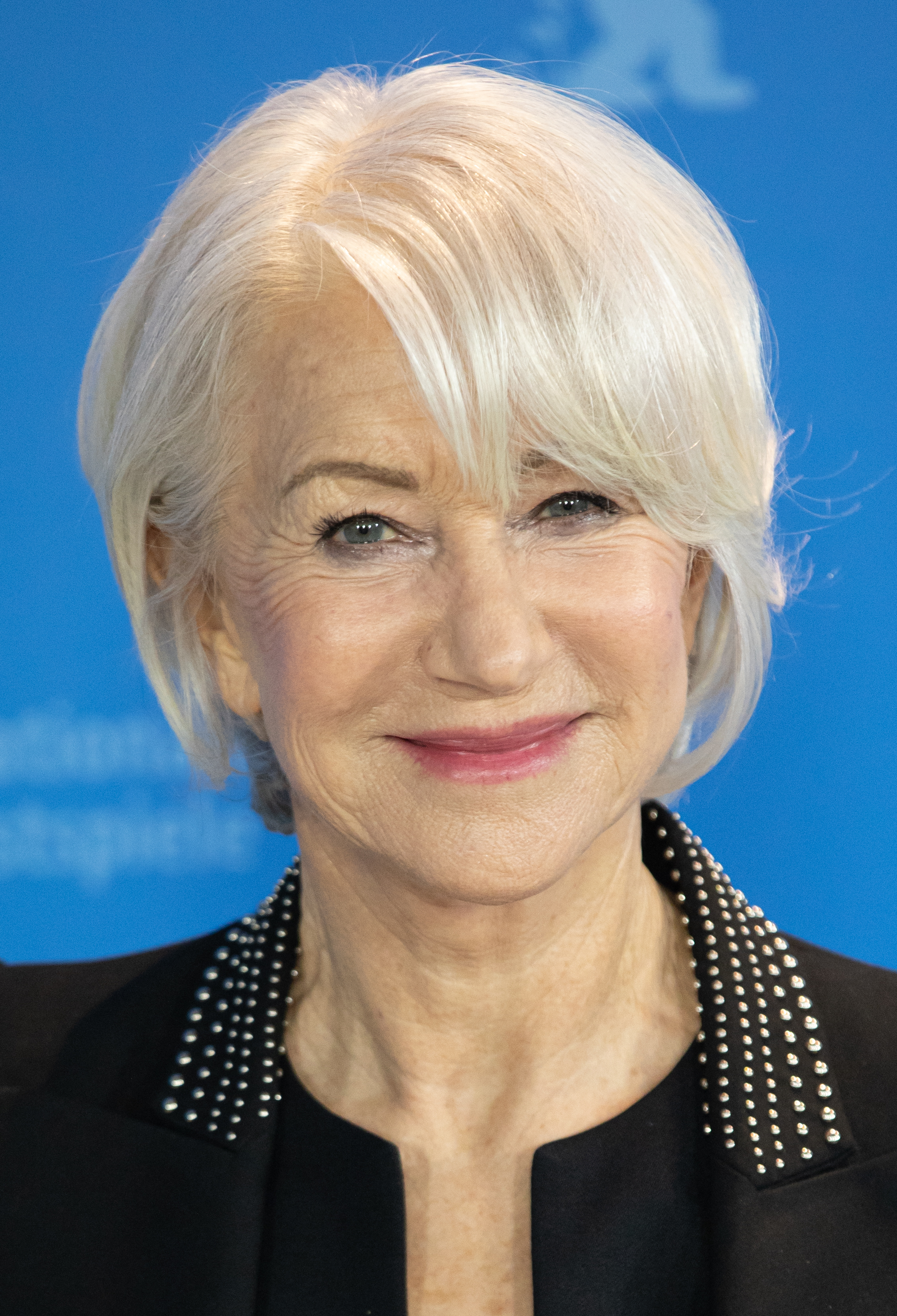
Helen Mirren won twice for Elizabeth I (2006) and Phil Spector (2013)

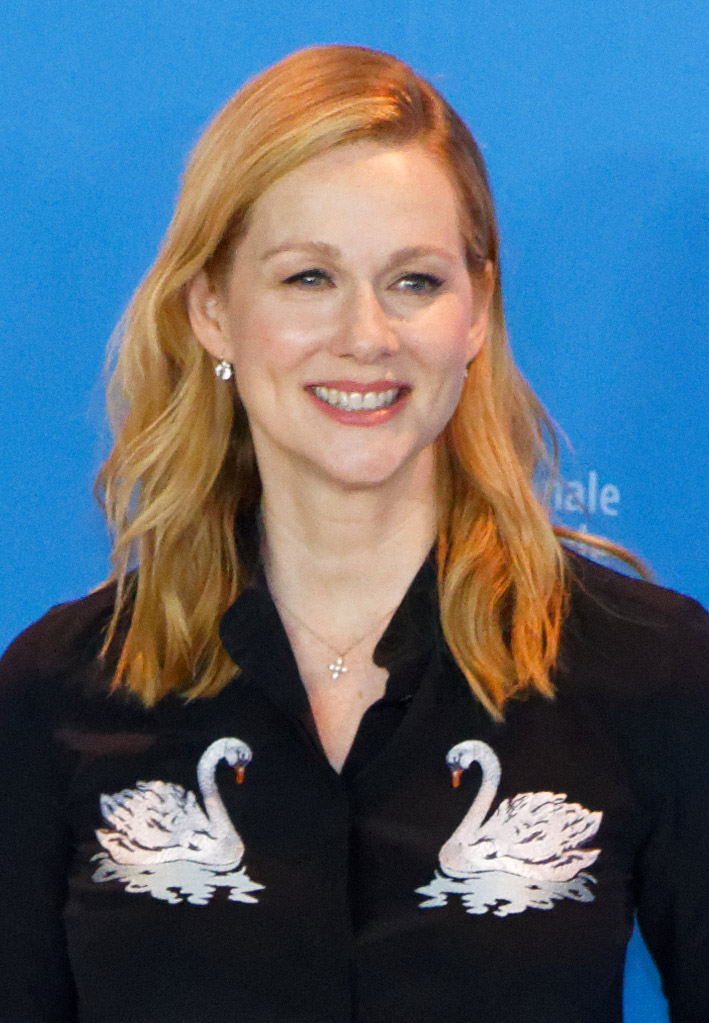
Laura Linney won for John Adams (2008)

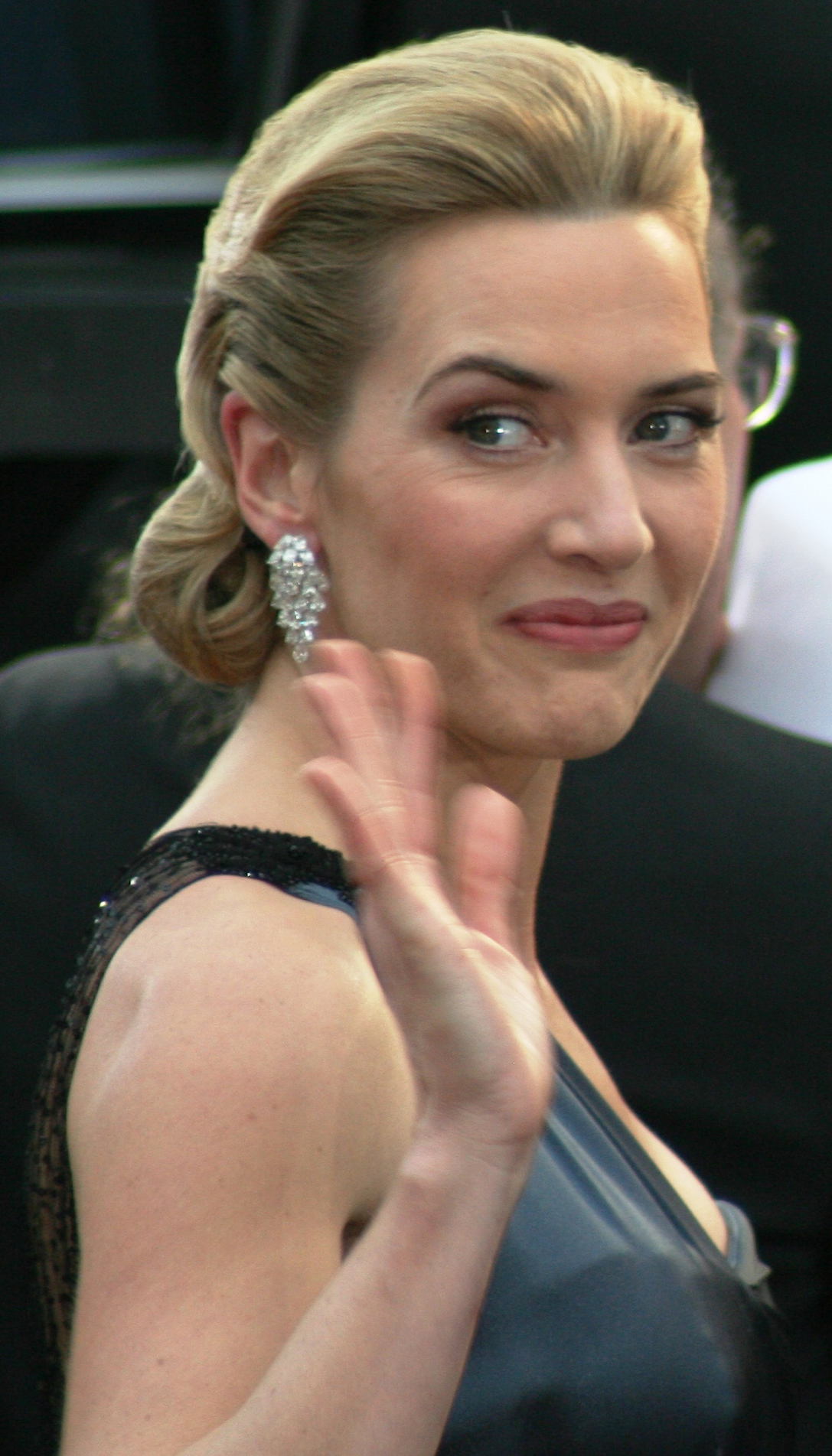
Kate Winslet won twice for Mildred Pierce (2011) and Mare of Easttown (2021)

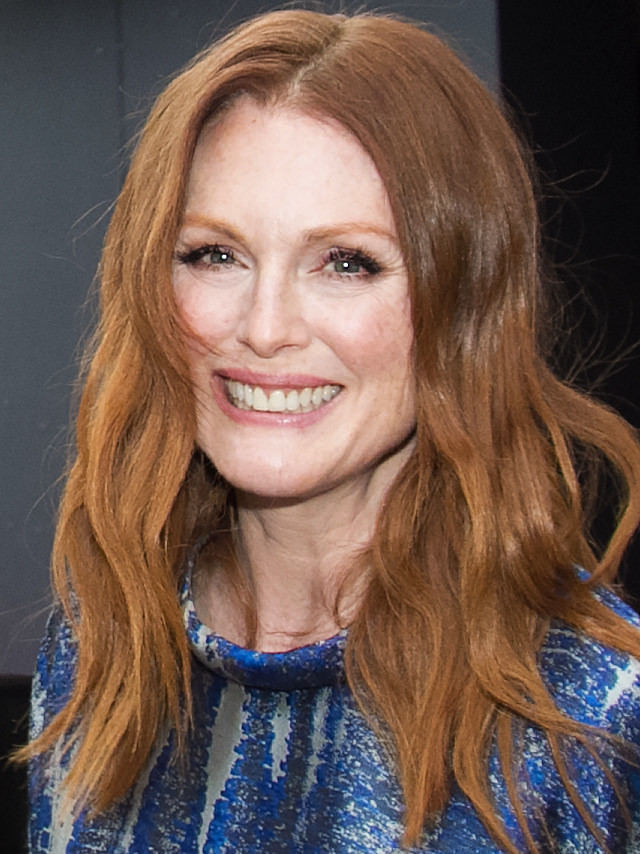
Julianne Moore won for Game Change (2012)

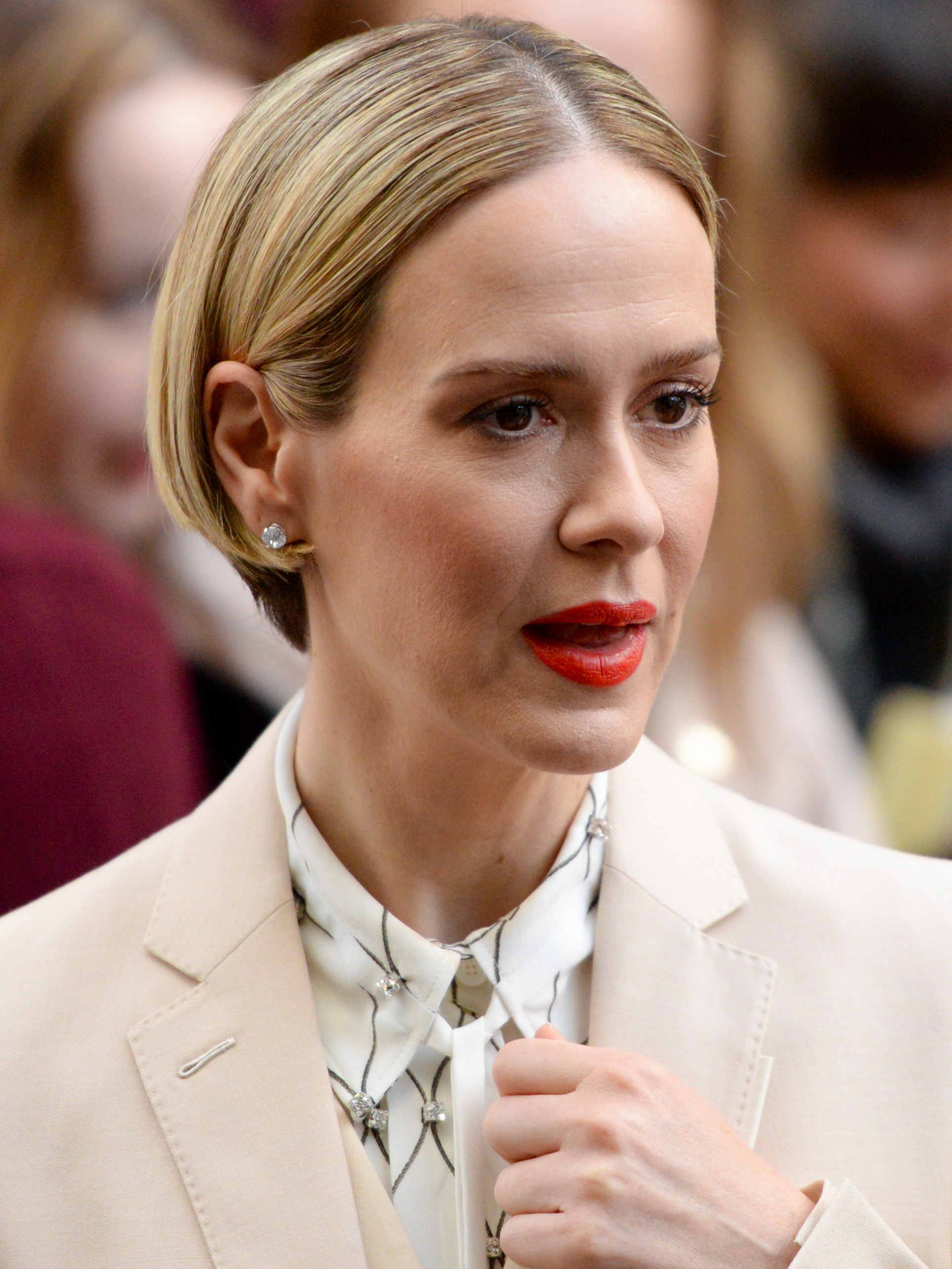
Sarah Paulson for The People v. O. J. Simpson: American Crime Story (2016)

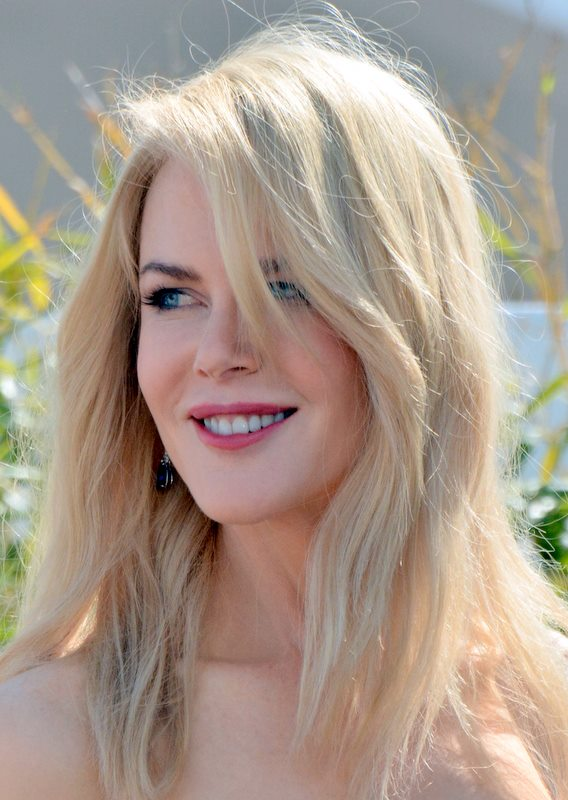
Nicole Kidman won Big Little Lies (2017)

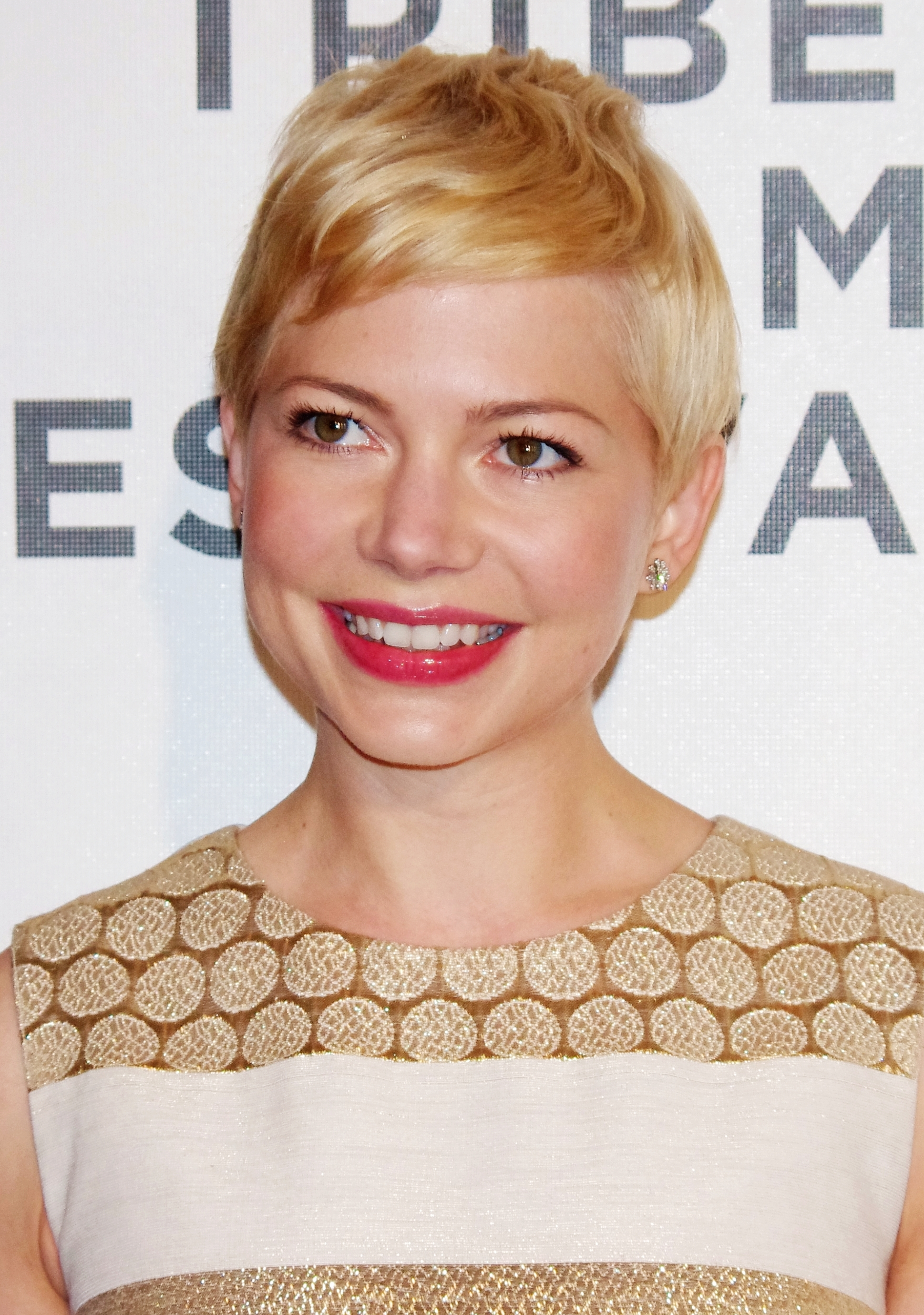
Michelle Williams won twice for Fosse/Verdon (2019) and Dying for Sex (2025)

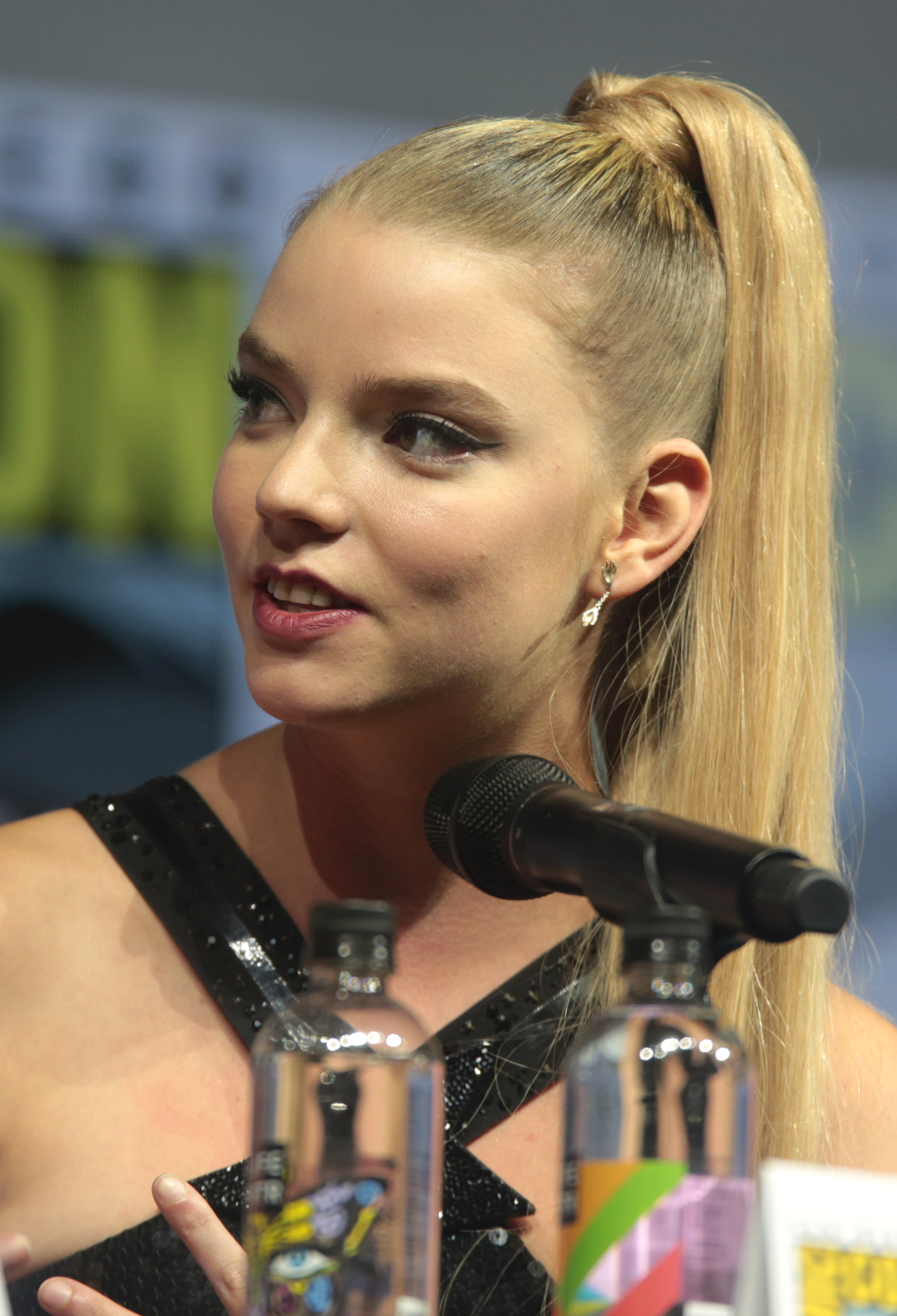
Anya Taylor-Joy won for The Queen's Gambit (2020)

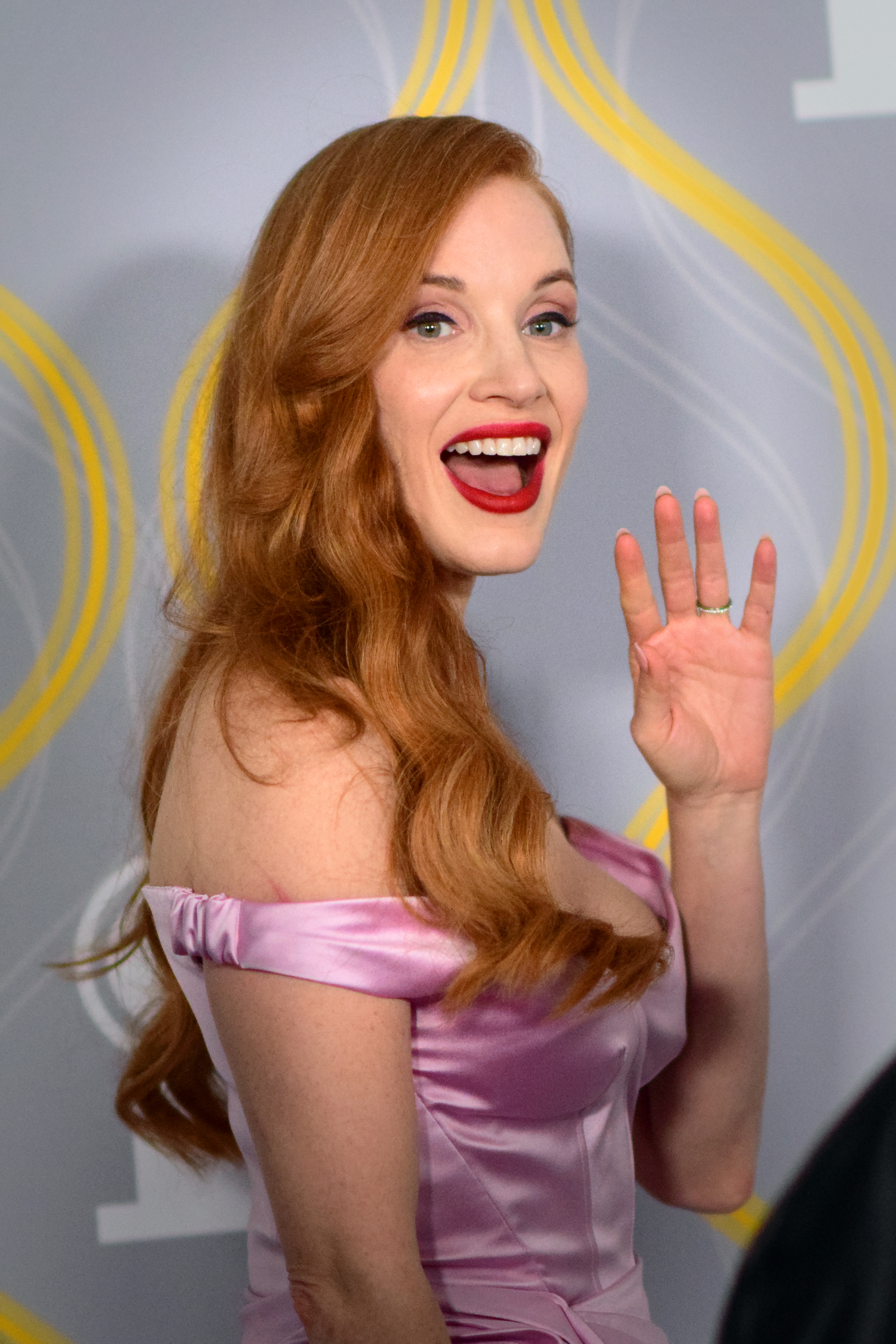
Jessica Chastain won for George & Tammy (2022)

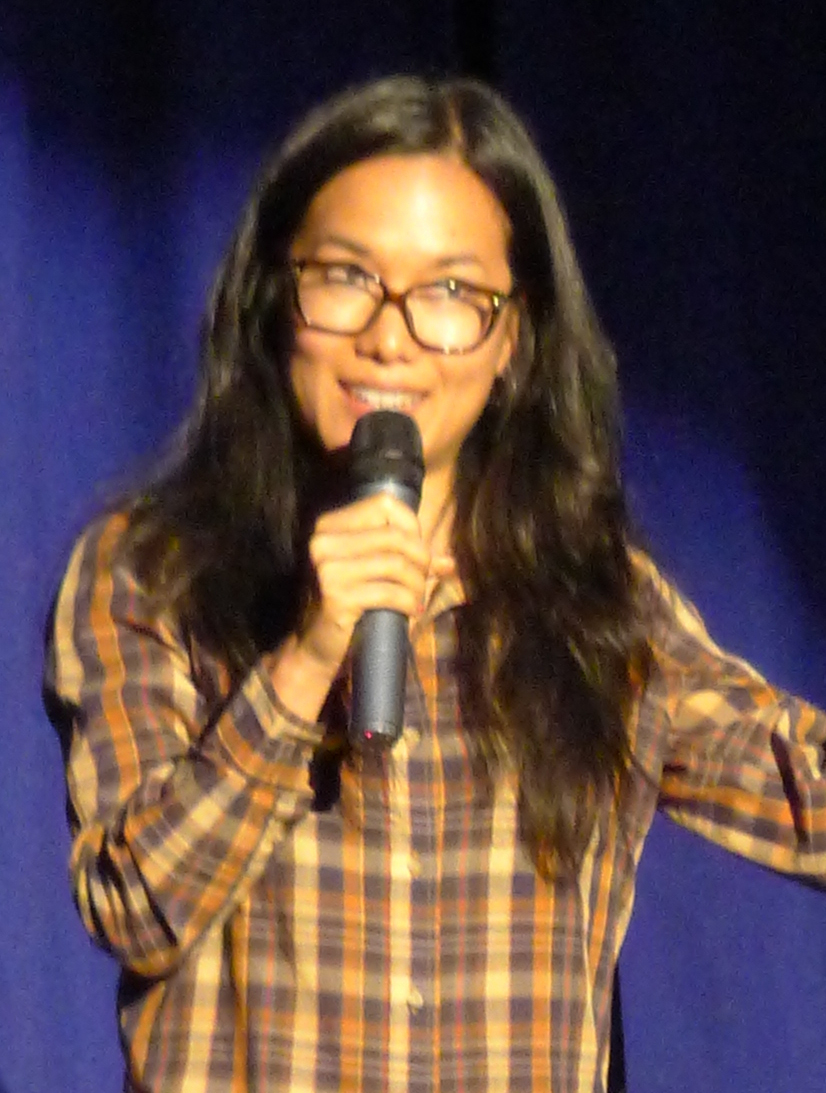
Ali Wong won for Beef (2023)

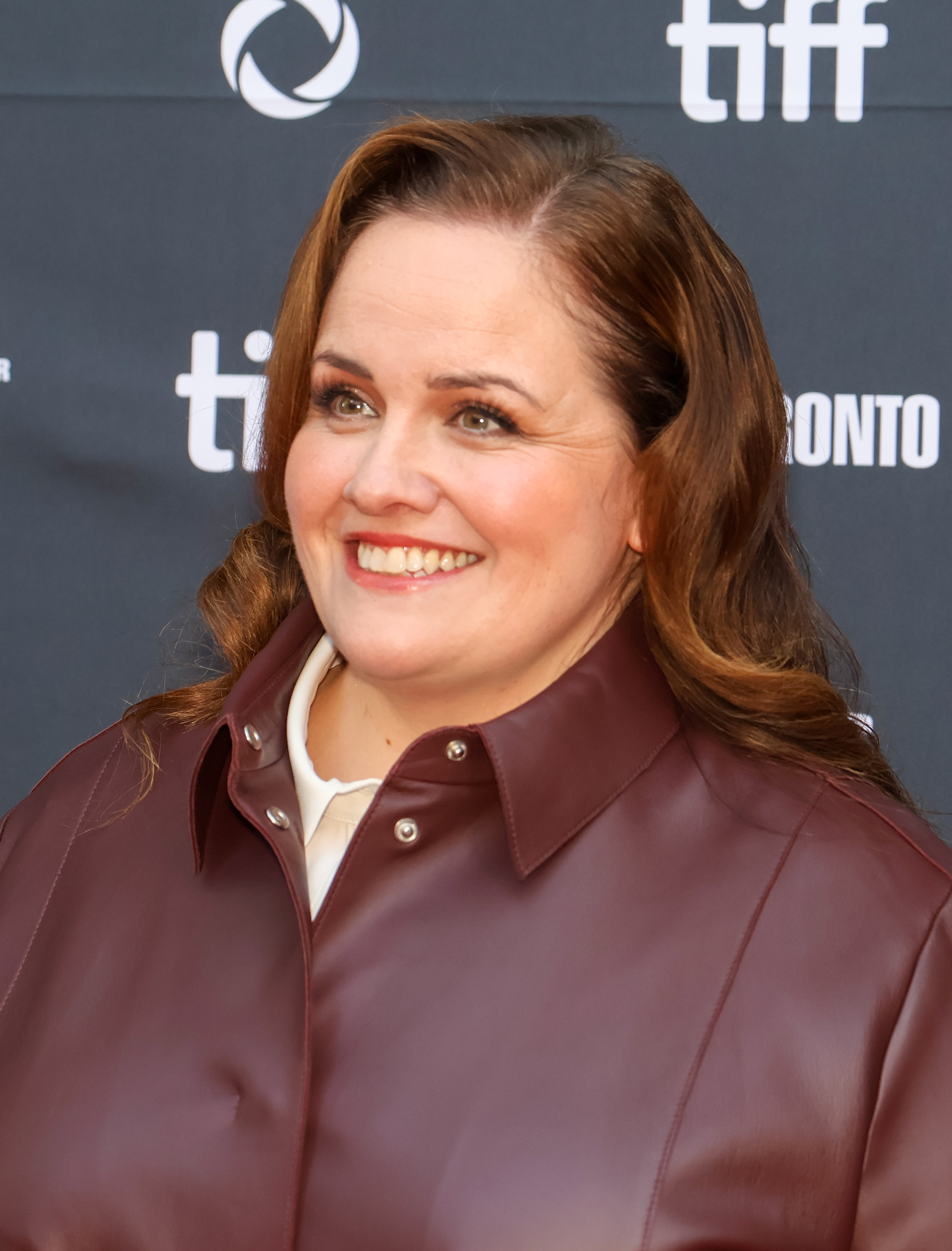
Jessica Gunning won for Baby Reindeer (2024).

=== 1990s ===
Year	Actress	Film	Role(s)	Ref.
1994 (1st)	Joanne Woodward	Breathing Lessons	Maggie Moran	
1994 (1st)	Katharine Hepburn	One Christmas	Cornelia Beaumont	
1994 (1st)	Diane Keaton	Amelia Earhart: The Final Flight	Amelia Earhart	
1994 (1st)	Sissy Spacek	A Place for Annie	Susan Lansing	
1994 (1st)	Cicely Tyson	Oldest Living Confederate Widow Tells All	Castralia, Marsden Family House Slave / Maid	
1995 (2nd)	Alfre Woodard	The Piano Lesson	Berniece Charles	
1995 (2nd)	Glenn Close	Serving in Silence	Col. Margarethe Cammermeyer	
1995 (2nd)	Sally Field	A Woman of Independent Means	Bess Alcott Steed Garner	
1995 (2nd)	Anjelica Huston	Buffalo Girls	Calamity Jane	
1995 (2nd)	Sela Ward	Almost Golden: The Jessica Savitch Story	Jessica Savitch	
1996 (3rd)	Kathy Bates	The Late Shift	Helen Kushnick	
1996 (3rd)	Anne Bancroft	Homecoming	Abigail Tillerman	
1996 (3rd)	Stockard Channing	An Unexpected Family	Barbara Whitney	
1996 (3rd)	Jena Malone	Bastard Out of Carolina	Ruth “Bone” Boatwright	
1996 (3rd)	Cicely Tyson	The Road to Galveston	Jordan Roosevelt	
1997 (4th)	Alfre Woodard	Miss Evers' Boys	Eunice Evers, R.N.	
1997 (4th)	Glenn Close	In the Gloaming	Janet	
1997 (4th)	Faye Dunaway	The Twilight of the Golds	Phyllis Gold	
1997 (4th)	Sigourney Weaver	Snow White: A Tale of Terror	Lady Claudia Hoffman	
1997 (4th)	Mare Winningham	George Wallace	Lurleen Wallace	
1998 (5th)	Angelina Jolie	Gia	Gia Carangi	
1998 (5th)	Ann-Margret	Life of the Party: The Pamela Harriman Story	Pamela Harriman	
1998 (5th)	Stockard Channing	The Baby Dance	Rachel Luckman	
1998 (5th)	Olympia Dukakis	More Tales of the City	Mrs. Anna Madrigal	
1998 (5th)	Mary Steenburgen	About Sarah	Sarah Elizabeth McCaffrey	
1999 (6th)	Halle Berry	Introducing Dorothy Dandridge	Dorothy Dandridge	
1999 (6th)	Judy Davis	A Cooler Climate	Paula	
1999 (6th)	Sally Field	A Cooler Climate	Iris	
1999 (6th)	Kathy Bates	Annie	Miss Agatha Hannigan	
1999 (6th)	Helen Mirren	The Passion of Ayn Rand	Ayn Rand	

=== 2000s ===
Year	Actress	Film	Role(s)	Ref.
2000 (7th)	Vanessa Redgrave	If These Walls Could Talk 2	Edith Tree	
2000 (7th)	Stockard Channing	The Truth About Jane	Janice Williams	
2000 (7th)	Judi Dench	The Last of the Blonde Bombshells	Elizabeth Harman	
2000 (7th)	Sally Field	David Copperfield	Aunt Betsey Trotwood	
2000 (7th)	Elizabeth Franz	Death of a Salesman	Linda Loman	
2001 (8th)	Judy Davis	Life with Judy Garland: Me and My Shadows	Judy Garland	
2001 (8th)	Angela Bassett	Ruby's Bucket of Blood	Ruby Delacroix	
2001 (8th)	Anjelica Huston	The Mists of Avalon	Vivianne, Lady of the Lake	
2001 (8th)	Sissy Spacek	Midwives	Sibyl Danforth	
2001 (8th)	Emma Thompson	Wit	Vivian Bearing	
2002 (9th)	Stockard Channing	The Matthew Shepard Story	Judy Shephard	
2002 (9th)	Kathy Bates	My Sister's Keeper	Christine Chapman	
2002 (9th)	Helen Mirren	Door to Door	Mrs. Porter	
2002 (9th)	Vanessa Redgrave	The Gathering Storm	Clementine Churchill	
2002 (9th)	Uma Thurman	Hysterical Blindness	Debbie Miller	
2003 (10th)	Meryl Streep	Angels in America	Hannah Pitt / Ethel Rosenberg; Rabbi Chemelwitz / The Angel Australia	
2003 (10th)	Anne Bancroft	The Roman Spring of Mrs. Stone	Contessa	
2003 (10th)	Helen Mirren	The Roman Spring of Mrs. Stone	Karen Stone	
2003 (10th)	Mary-Louise Parker	Angels in America	Harper Pitt	
2003 (10th)	Emma Thompson	Angels in America	Nurse Emily / Homeless Woman / The Angel America	
2004 (11th)	Glenn Close	The Lion in Winter	Queen Eleanor	
2004 (11th)	Patricia Heaton	The Goodbye Girl	Paula McFadden	
2004 (11th)	Keke Palmer	The Wool Cap	Lou	
2004 (11th)	Hilary Swank	Iron Jawed Angels	Alice Paul	
2004 (11th)	Charlize Theron	The Life and Death of Peter Sellers	Britt Ekland	
2005 (12th)	S. Epatha Merkerson	Lackawanna Blues	Rachel "Nanny" Crosby	
2005 (12th)	Tonantzin Carmelo	Into the West	Thunder Heart Woman	
2005 (12th)	Cynthia Nixon	Warm Springs	Eleanor Roosevelt	
2005 (12th)	Joanne Woodward	Empire Falls	Francine Whiting	
2005 (12th)	Robin Wright	Empire Falls	Grace Roby	
2006 (13th)	Helen Mirren	Elizabeth I	Queen Elizabeth I	
2006 (13th)	Annette Bening	Mrs. Harris	Jean Harris	
2006 (13th)	Shirley Jones	Hidden Places	Aunt Batty	
2006 (13th)	Cloris Leachman	Mrs. Harris	Pearl “Billie” Schwartz	
2006 (13th)	Greta Scacchi	Broken Trail	Nola Johns	
2007 (14th)	Queen Latifah	Life Support	Ana Walace	
2007 (14th)	Ellen Burstyn	Mitch Albom's For One More Day	Posey	
2007 (14th)	Debra Messing	The Starter Wife	Molly Kagan	
2007 (14th)	Anna Paquin	Bury My Heart at Wounded Knee	Elaine Goodale	
2007 (14th)	Vanessa Redgrave	The Fever	Woman	
2007 (14th)	Gena Rowlands	What If God Were the Sun?	Melissa Eisenbloom	
2008 (15th)	Laura Linney	John Adams	Abigail Adams	
2008 (15th)	Laura Dern	Recount	Katherine Harris	
2008 (15th)	Shirley MacLaine	Coco Chanel	Coco Chanel	
2008 (15th)	Phylicia Rashad	A Raisin in the Sun	Lena Younger	
2008 (15th)	Susan Sarandon	Bernard and Doris	Doris Duke	
2009 (16th)	Drew Barrymore	Grey Gardens	Edith “Little Edie” Beale	
2009 (16th)	Joan Allen	Georgia O'Keeffe	Georgia O‘Keeffe	
2009 (16th)	Ruby Dee	America	Mrs. Harper	
2009 (16th)	Jessica Lange	Grey Gardens	Edith “Big Edie” Bouvier-Beale	
2009 (16th)	Sigourney Weaver	Prayers for Bobby	Mary Griffith	

=== 2010s ===
Year	Actress	Film	Role(s)	Ref.
2010 (17th)	Claire Danes	Temple Grandin	Temple Grandin	
2010 (17th)	Catherine O'Hara	Temple Grandin	Aunt Ann	
2010 (17th)	Julia Ormond	Temple Grandin	Eustacia Grandin	
2010 (17th)	Winona Ryder	When Love Is Not Enough	Lois Wilson	
2010 (17th)	Susan Sarandon	You Don't Know Jack	Janet Good	
2011 (18th)	Kate Winslet	Mildred Pierce	Mildred Pierce	
2011 (18th)	Diane Lane	Cinema Verite	Pat Loud	
2011 (18th)	Maggie Smith	Downton Abbey	Violet, Dowager Countess of Grantham	
2011 (18th)	Emily Watson	Appropriate Adult	Janet Leach	
2011 (18th)	Betty White	The Lost Valentine	Caroline Thomas	
2012 (19th)	Julianne Moore	Game Change	Sarah Palin	
2012 (19th)	Nicole Kidman	Hemingway & Gellhorn	Martha Gellhorn	
2012 (19th)	Charlotte Rampling	Restless	Eva Delectorskaya	
2012 (19th)	Sigourney Weaver	Political Animals	Elaine Barrish Hammond	
2012 (19th)	Alfre Woodard	Steel Magnolias	Louisa "Ouiser" Boudreaux	
2013 (20th)	Helen Mirren	Phil Spector	Linda Kenney Baden	
2013 (20th)	Angela Bassett	Betty & Coretta	Coretta Scott King	
2013 (20th)	Helena Bonham Carter	Burton & Taylor	Elizabeth Taylor	
2013 (20th)	Holly Hunter	Top of the Lake	GJ	
2013 (20th)	Elisabeth Moss	Top of the Lake	Det. Robin Griffin	
2014 (21st)	Frances McDormand	Olive Kitteridge	Olive Kitteridge	
2014 (21st)	Ellen Burstyn	Flowers in the Attic	Olivia Foxworth	
2014 (21st)	Maggie Gyllenhaal	The Honourable Woman	Nessa Stein, Baroness Stein of Tilbury	
2014 (21st)	Julia Roberts	The Normal Heart	Dr. Emma Brookner	
2014 (21st)	Cicely Tyson	The Trip to Bountiful	Mrs. Carrie Watts	
2015 (22nd)	Queen Latifah	Bessie	Bessie Smith	
2015 (22nd)	Nicole Kidman	Grace of Monaco	Grace Kelly	
2015 (22nd)	Christina Ricci	The Lizzie Borden Chronicles	Lizzie Borden	
2015 (22nd)	Susan Sarandon	The Secret Life of Marilyn Monroe	Gladys Monroe Mortenson	
2015 (22nd)	Kristen Wiig	The Spoils Before Dying	Delores O’Dell	
2016 (23rd)	Sarah Paulson	The People v. O. J. Simpson: American Crime Story	Marcia Clark	
2016 (23rd)	Bryce Dallas Howard	Black Mirror	Lacie Pound	
2016 (23rd)	Felicity Huffman	American Crime	Leslie Graham	
2016 (23rd)	Audra McDonald	Lady Day at Emerson's Bar and Grill	Billie Holiday	
2016 (23rd)	Kerry Washington	Confirmation	Anita Hill	
2017 (24th)	Nicole Kidman	Big Little Lies	Celeste Wright	
2017 (24th)	Laura Dern	Big Little Lies	Renata Klein	
2017 (24th)	Jessica Lange	Feud: Bette and Joan	Joan Crawford	
2017 (24th)	Susan Sarandon	Feud: Bette and Joan	Bette Davis	
2017 (24th)	Reese Witherspoon	Big Little Lies	Madeline Martha Mackenzie	
2018 (25th)	Patricia Arquette	Escape at Dannemora	Tilly Mitchell	
2018 (25th)	Amy Adams	Sharp Objects	Camille Preaker	
2018 (25th)	Patricia Clarkson	Sharp Objects	Adora Crellin	
2018 (25th)	Penélope Cruz	The Assassination of Gianni Versace: American Crime Story	Donatella Versace	
2018 (25th)	Emma Stone	Maniac	Annie Landsberg	
2019 (26th)	Michelle Williams	Fosse/Verdon	Gwen Verdon	
2019 (26th)	Patricia Arquette	The Act	Dee Dee Blanchard	
2019 (26th)	Toni Collette	Unbelievable	Det. Grace Rasmussen	
2019 (26th)	Joey King	The Act	Gypsy Rose Blanchard	
2019 (26th)	Emily Watson	Chernobyl	Ulana Khomyuk	

=== 2020s ===
Year	Actress	Film	Role(s)	Ref.
2020 (27th)	Anya Taylor-Joy	The Queen's Gambit	Beth Harmon	
2020 (27th)	Cate Blanchett	Mrs. America	Phyllis Schlafly	
2020 (27th)	Michaela Coel	I May Destroy You	Arabella Essiedu	
2020 (27th)	Nicole Kidman	The Undoing	Grace Fraser	
2020 (27th)	Kerry Washington	Little Fires Everywhere	Mia Warren	
2021 (28th)	Kate Winslet	Mare of Easttown	Marianne Sheehan	
2021 (28th)	Jennifer Coolidge	The White Lotus	Tanya McQuoid	
2021 (28th)	Cynthia Erivo	Genius: Aretha	Aretha Franklin	
2021 (28th)	Margaret Qualley	Maid	Alexandra "Alex" Russell	
2021 (28th)	Jean Smart	Mare of Easttown	Helen Fahey	
2022 (29th)	Jessica Chastain	George & Tammy	Tammy Wynette	
2022 (29th)	Emily Blunt	The English	Cornelia Locke	
2022 (29th)	Julia Garner	Inventing Anna	Anna Sorokin / Anna Delvey	
2022 (29th)	Niecy Nash-Betts	Dahmer – Monster: The Jeffrey Dahmer Story	Glenda Cleveland	
2022 (29th)	Amanda Seyfried	The Dropout	Elizabeth Holmes	
2023 (30th)	Ali Wong	Beef	Amy Lau	
2023 (30th)	Uzo Aduba	Painkiller	Edie Flowers	
2023 (30th)	Kathryn Hahn	Tiny Beautiful Things	Clare Pierce	
2023 (30th)	Brie Larson	Lessons in Chemistry	Elizabeth Zott	
2023 (30th)	Bel Powley	A Small Light	Miep Gies	
2024 (31st)	Jessica Gunning	Baby Reindeer	Martha Scott	
2024 (31st)	Kathy Bates	The Great Lillian Hall	Edith Wilson	
2024 (31st)	Cate Blanchett	Disclaimer	Catherine Ravenscroft	
2024 (31st)	Jodie Foster	True Detective: Night Country	Det. Elizabeth Danvers	
2024 (31st)	Lily Gladstone	Under the Bridge	Cam Bentland	
2024 (31st)	Cristin Milioti	The Penguin	Sofia Falcone	
2025 (32nd)	Michelle Williams	Dying for Sex	Molly Kochan	
2025 (32nd)	Claire Danes	The Beast in Me	Agatha Wiggs	
2025 (32nd)	Erin Doherty	Adolescence	Briony Ariston	
2025 (32nd)	Sarah Snook	All Her Fault	Marissa Irvine	
2025 (32nd)	Christine Tremarco	Adolescence	Manda Miller	

== Actors with multiple awards ==
2 wins

- Helen Mirren
- Queen Latifah
- Michelle Williams
- Kate Winslet
- Alfre Woodard

== Actors with multiple nominations ==
5 nominations

- Helen Mirren

4 nominations

- Kathy Bates
- Stockard Channing
- Nicole Kidman
- Susan Sarandon

3 nominations

- Glenn Close
- Sally Field
- Vanessa Redgrave
- Cicely Tyson
- Sigourney Weaver
- Alfre Woodard

2 nominations

- Patricia Arquette
- Anne Bancroft
- Angela Bassett
- Cate Blanchett
- Ellen Burstyn
- Claire Danes
- Judy Davis
- Laura Dern
- Anjelica Huston
- Jessica Lange
- Queen Latifah
- Sissy Spacek
- Emma Thompson
- Kerry Washington
- Emily Watson
- Michelle Williams
- Kate Winslet
- Joanne Woodward

== Programs with multiple nominations ==
3 nominations

- Angels in America (HBO)
- Big Little Lies (HBO)
- Temple Grandin (HBO)

2 nominations

- The Act (Hulu)
- Adolescence (Netflix)
- American Crime Story (FX)
- A Cooler Climate (Showtime)
- Empire Falls (HBO)
- Feud (FX)
- Grey Gardens (HBO)
- Mare of Easttown (HBO)
- Mrs. Harris (HBO)
- The Roman Spring of Mrs. Stone (Showtime)
- Sharp Objects (HBO)
- Top of the Lake (Sundance)

== See also ==
- Primetime Emmy Award for Outstanding Lead Actress in a Limited Series or Movie
- Primetime Emmy Award for Outstanding Supporting Actress in a Limited Series or Movie
- Golden Globe Award for Best Actress – Miniseries or Television Film
- Golden Globe Award for Best Supporting Actress – Series, Miniseries or Television Film
- Critics' Choice Television Award for Best Actress in a Movie/Miniseries
- Critics' Choice Television Award for Best Supporting Actress in a Movie/Miniseries
