= The Psychology of Self-Esteem =

Non-fiction book by Nathaniel Branden

- 32nd anniversary edition cover
- Author: Nathaniel Branden
- Language: English
- Subject: Psychology, Self-esteem
- Genre: Non-fiction
- Publisher: Nash (1st edition), Jossey-Bass (32nd anniversary edition)
- Publication date: 1969
- Media type: Book
- Pages: 242 (1st edition)
- ISBN: 0-8402-1109-0 (1st edition); ISBN 0-7879-4526-9 (32nd anniversary edition)

The Psychology of Self-Esteem is a book by Nathaniel Branden, first published in 1969. It explains Branden's theories of human psychology, focusing on the role of self-esteem. Most of the book was written during Branden's association with Ayn Rand, and it reflects some of her philosophical ideas. The book's success helped to popularize the idea of self-esteem as an important element of self-improvement.

== Synopsis ==
There is no value-judgment more important to man—no factor more decisive in his psychological development and motivation—than the estimate he passes on himself.

— Chapter 7: The Meaning of Self-Esteem

The book is divided into two parts. In Part One ("The Foundations"), Branden explains his views on human nature and the science of psychology. He discusses his theories about consciousness, volition, emotions (with particular attention to emotional repression) and mental health.

The material in Part One is about philosophical and psychological theory and does not focus on self-esteem, which is the predominant subject in Part Two ("The Psychology of Self-Esteem"). He describes self-esteem as "the integrated sum of self-confidence and self-respect", which he describes respectively as "a sense of personal efficacy and a sense of personal worth." Branden considers self-esteem to be one of the most important factors in human psychology.

Branden contrasts healthy self-esteem with conditions that he views as psychological problems. First is what he calls "pseudo-self-esteem," which he describes as "an irrational pretense at self-value," and "a nonrational, self-protective device to diminish anxiety and to provide a spurious sense of security". Next he discusses pathological anxiety, which he traces to a lack of self-esteem, particularly a lack of self-confidence. He further connects this to feelings of guilt and depression, which he views as aspects of anxiety. The last problem he discusses is one he calls "social metaphysics", which he describes as "the psychological syndrome that characterizes a person who holds the minds of other men, not objective reality, as his ultimate psycho-epistemological frame of reference."

The final chapter discusses psychotherapy. Branden emphasizes the importance of moral values, stating that "there is no way for a psychotherapist to keep his own moral convictions out of his professional work." He does not view this as a flaw, but rather argues that the therapist should guide patients towards values that will improve their self-esteem. "Effective psychotherapy requires a conscious, rational, scientific code of ethics", says Branden, and he identifies that code as the Objectivist ethics of Ayn Rand. He then briefly discusses five different therapeutic techniques and wraps up the book with a concluding section.

The thirty-second anniversary edition adds a preface in which Branden explains that although his views have changed in some ways, he has chosen not to alter the original text. Instead he added an epilogue on "Working with Self-Esteem in Psychotherapy". The epilogue updates his views on self-esteem, which have changed in some particulars since the book was first written. He also describes his more recent therapeutic methods, focusing on the use of sentence-completion exercises.

== Background ==
The Psychology of Self-Esteem was largely written while Branden was associated with Ayn Rand. It was Branden's first solo book, although he had previously written essays for two of Rand's books and for Who Is Ayn Rand?, which he co-wrote with his then-wife Barbara Branden. Some of the material comes from Who Is Ayn Rand? and from articles he wrote for The Objectivist, a magazine he and Rand co-edited. Rand was Branden's mentor and former lover, but in 1968 she had broken off all relations with him. In his memoirs, Branden recalled that important parts of the book were written during the "agonizing chaos" of the collapse of their relationship.

Rand had helped Branden obtain a contract with World Publishing, which was affiliated with her own publisher, and had offered to write an introduction for the book. When their relationship ended, she pressured the publisher to cancel his contract, which they did after he missed a deadline for delivering the completed manuscript. She also threatened to withhold the use of material that had been copyrighted by The Objectivist, although she took no legal action when Branden used the material anyway.

== Publication history ==
Despite Rand's effort's to prevent the book's publication, the newly founded Nash Publishing released it in the fall of 1969. The paperback rights were subsequently sold to Bantam Books. In 2001, a thirty-second anniversary edition was published by Jossey-Bass, with a new introduction and epilogue by Branden.

=== Editions ===
- First edition (hardcover). 1969. Los Angeles: Nash Publishing. ISBN 0-8402-1109-0. OCLC 24729.
- First paperback edition. 1971. New York: Bantam Books. ISBN 0-553-27188-1. OCLC 426275125.
- 32nd anniversary edition. 2001. San Francisco: Jossey-Bass. ISBN 0-7879-4526-9. OCLC 757675692.

== Reception ==
The book was a popular success and has sold over a million copies. It has been credited with spreading ideas about self-esteem to general audiences. Self-help expert Tom Butler-Bowdon warned that "readers find this book tough going", particularly in the earlier chapters, but described it as "one of the earliest classics of the popular psychology genre".

Critics such as sociologist Frank Furedi and neuropsychologist Paul Pearsall cited the book as an example of what they see as a cultural trend of over-emphasizing the significance of self-esteem. Psychology professor Robyn Dawes said that Branden propagated a false "belief that human distress can be traced to deficient self-esteem", which Dawes describes as based in bias rather than evidence. Author Charles Murray, although critical of the self-esteem movement in general, is somewhat more positive about Branden. Murray said it would have been better if other promoters of self-esteem "had focused on self-esteem as Branden described it—an internalized sense of self-responsibility and self-sufficiency."

In contrast, author Alfie Kohn supported the idea that self-esteem was important, but criticized Branden for founding his work "in Ayn Rand's glorification of selfishness." Branden's connection to Rand was also criticized by psychiatrist Thomas Szasz, who said the book wrongly ignores the work of those outside Rand's Objectivist movement, especially other psychologists and therapists besides Branden himself. He accuses Branden of "an exaggerated sense of self-importance and an uncritical reverence for Rand as a psychologist."

In The Myth of Self-Esteem, psychologist Albert Ellis faulted the book for focusing on "reason and competence" as the only sources of self-esteem, a position he describes Branden as moving away from later.
