= The Disowned Self =

1971 non-fiction book by Nathaniel Branden

- Paperback edition cover
- Author: Nathaniel Branden
- Language: English
- Subject: Psychology, Self-Esteem, Self-Alienation, Psychotherapy
- Genre: Non-fiction
- Publisher: Bantam Books
- Publication date: 1972
- Publication place: United States
- Media type: Book
- Pages: 256 (first edition)
- ISBN: 0-8402-1212-7 (first edition)

The Disowned Self is a book written by Nathaniel Branden in 1971 and published in 1972. It was Branden's third book in the area of psychology (preceded by The Psychology of Self-Esteem and Breaking Free).

== Synopsis ==
The Disowned Self explores, "...the problem of self-alienation - a condition in which the individual is out of contact with his own needs, feelings, emotions, frustrations and longings, so that he is largely oblivious to his actual self and his life is the reflection of an unreal self, of a role he has adopted. The problem of obliviousness to self, the causes and consequences of such obliviousness, and its treatment psychotherapeutically - is the theme of this book."

Branden describes the process whereby individuals become disconnected from their inner experience. The book reintroduces, in an abbreviated form, Branden's previously published theory of psychology and the central role played by self-esteem. It goes on to provide a philosophical foundation for the psychological theory of the disowned self. The book gives detailed descriptions of patients experiencing the problem, the history of their problems, and the treatments used by Branden. One method emphasized by Branden is the use of "sentence stems", a therapeutic technique he adopted years earlier.

In the Appendix of later editions, the book contains a reprint of an interview with Branden originally published in Reason magazine where he discusses his work and this book in particular. There is also a reprint of a chapter on emotions taken from The Psychology of Self-Esteem.

== History ==
In 1970, Branden enrolled in a doctoral program at the California Graduate Institute. The Disowned Self was originally prepared as material for his dissertation, which he submitted in 1971. In an unusual sequence, the first edition of the book was released by Nash Publications in January 1972, before Branden's degree was awarded in July 1973. A second edition was issued in paperback by Bantam Books in June 1973, followed by more or less annual reissues through 1984.

== See also ==
- Psychotherapy
- True self and false self
