= Bruce Lipton =

American writer and lecturer

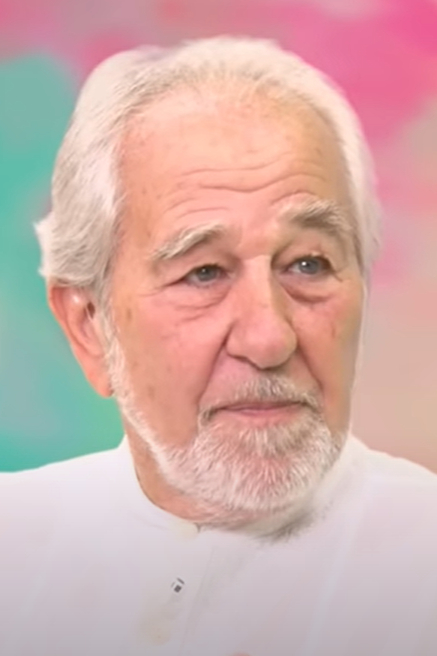
- Lipton during an interview in Prague, Czech Republic, December 2022
- Born: Mount Kisco, New York, U.S.
- Education: C.W. Post Campus of Long Island University, University of Virginia

Bruce Harold Lipton is an American writer and lecturer. Trained as a cell biologist, Lipton has become well known for his views on epigenetics, arguing that human thoughts and emotions can have a powerful epigenetic influence on body including via "sheer energy". These views have been largely dismissed by relevant experts and described by some peers as pseudoscience. Lipton has been associated with several alternative medicine organisations.

== Beliefs and advocacy ==
Lipton received a B.A. in biology from C.W. Post Campus of Long Island University in 1966 and a PhD in developmental biology from the University of Virginia in 1971. From 1973 to 1982, he taught anatomy at the University of Wisconsin School of Medicine, before joining St. George's University School of Medicine as a professor of anatomy for three years. He said that sometime in the 1980s, he rejected atheism and came to believe that the way cells function demonstrates the existence of God. Since 1993, he has taught primarily at alternative and chiropractic colleges and schools. Lipton has lectured at the New Zealand College of Chiropractic in Auckland.

Lipton has argued that human thoughts and emotions can be considered part of epigenetics, and have a powerful effect on the human body beyond hormonal changes. He has speculated that thoughts and emotions influence cells via "sheer energy". In 2010, Katherine Ellison wrote in her opinion column in the journal Frontiers in Ecology and the Environment that Lipton "remains on the sidelines of conventional discussions of epigenetics" and had admitted (in Ellison's words) that "mainstream science has basically ignored him". In Science-Based Medicine, David Gorski called Lipton a "well-known crank" and likened his idea to the law of attraction, also known as "The Secret": "wanting something badly enough makes it so". Gorski criticized the support Lipton's ideas received from Deepak Chopra, calling both of them "quackery supporters".

Lipton has been known to express opposition to vaccinations, specifically with regard to a supposed association between vaccines and autism that has been firmly discredited: "The most important issue we have to face is this very serious issues about vaccines... The question of whether [a vaccine] is beneficial or not is now coming to the front because we are finding a very very epidemic increase in regard to allergic reactions or hypersensitivity. We're also finding that people are bringing in the concept that autism seems to associated with the widespread use of vaccines". He may believe that "forcing the immune system to respond to these vaccinations in such an abnormal way is not in the best interest of the body's system" and that for vaccines to work, they must be "natural". Lipton often uses the naturalistic fallacy.

Lipton's apparently anti-vaccine viewpoints contradict the overwhelming scientific consensus, which firmly establishes vaccines' safety and effectiveness in preventing various diseases.

== Books ==
- The Biology of Belief – Unleashing the Power of Consciousness, Matter & Miracles (2005)
- Spontaneous Evolution: Our Positive Future and a Way to Get There from Here (2010)
- The Honeymoon Effect: The Science of Creating Heaven on Earth (2013)
- The Biology of Belief – 10th Anniversary Edition (2015)

== See also ==
- New Thought
- Paul Pearsall
- Quantum mysticism
