= Patrecia Scott =

Canadian-born model and actress (1940–1977)

Patrecia Scott (January 23, 1940 – March 31, 1977) was a Canadian-born model as well as television and stage actress who was married to Nathaniel Branden from 1969 until her drowning death in 1977.

== Biography ==
Born Patrecia Gullison, she started attending, in 1961, talks by psychologist and lecturer on Objectivist philosophy Nathaniel Branden, who was also born in Canada. In 1963, she married fellow student Lawrence Scott but, within months of her marriage, became romantically involved with Branden. The relationship ultimately became one of the key factors in Branden's split with his partner, mentor and lover, Ayn Rand.

Having used the name Patrecia Scott for modeling and acting assignments, she divorced Scott in 1966 and sought Rand's advice regarding a new professional name. Rand suggested that she take the surname of Gail Wynand, one of the lead characters in her novel The Fountainhead. Her new stage name thus became Patrecia Wynand.

In 1968, she and Branden moved to California and married in November 1969. In 1977, she drowned at home due to what was considered to be an epileptic seizure triggered by sunlight reflecting off the water in the pool while feeding their dog.

== Known as ==
- Patrecia Scott (first married name and professional name)
- Patrecia Branden (second married name)
- Patrecia Wynand (stage name)

== Television (as Patrecia Wynand) ==
- Khan!

TV episode title: "Mask of Deceit"
Originally aired 1975

- Hawaii Five-O

TV episode title: "A Woman's Work Is with a Gun"
Originally aired January 21, 1975
Character name: Fay

- Mannix

TV episode title: "A Walk in the Shadows"
Originally aired 1972
Character name: Linda

- The Man and the City

TV episode title: "Jennifer"
Originally aired 1971
Character name: Rachel

- Do Not Fold, Spindle or Mutilate

ABC Movie of the Week
Originally aired 1971
Character name: Hostess

== Sources ==
- Branden, Barbara (1986), The Passion of Ayn Rand.
- Branden, Nathaniel (1989), Judgment Day.
