= Edith Efron =

American journalist and author (1922–2001)

- Born: 1922; New York
- Died: April 20, 2001 (aged 78–79)
- Education: Columbia University
- Writing career
- Language: English
- Notable work: How CBS Tried to Kill a Book

Edith Efron (/ˈɛfrən/; 1922 – April 20, 2001) was an American journalist and author.

== Biography ==
Efron was born in New York. Graduating from the Columbia University Graduate School of Journalism, where Efron studied under journalist John Chamberlain, her career began as a writer for the New York Times Magazine. In 1947, she married a Haitian businessman, with whom she had a child. After living in Haiti and working as a Central America correspondent for Time and Life magazines, she divorced and returned to New York City where she worked on the staff of television journalist Mike Wallace. After her return to New York, she also became part of Ayn Rand's circle, contributed to Rand's magazine, The Objectivist, and presented a lecture series on non-fiction writing at the Nathaniel Branden Institute in the 1960s, although the two women later parted ways.

She became a writer and, later, a senior editor of the widely circulated TV Guide magazine in the 1960s and 1970s, where she wrote celebrity profiles, political columns and editorials. In the 1970s, she was also ghostwriter for former Secretary of the Treasury William E. Simon's book A Time For Truth. In her editorials for TV Guide, Efron criticized what she saw as liberal media bias, and she defended conservative politicians Barry Goldwater and Ronald Reagan. Efron and other columnists writing in TV Guide like Kevin Phillips and Pat Buchanan advocated the elimination of the Fairness Doctrine by the Federal Communications Commission, in order to permit conservative viewpoints greater access to the airwaves. The FCC would remove the policy in the late 1980s.

In their 1993 history of TV Guide, Changing Channels: America in TV Guide, Cornell professors Glenn C. Altschuler and David I. Grossvogel have stated that "no writer...did more to shape TV Guide," a publication that reached over 40 million readers at the time. Her impact on the magazine, they said, included her role as "the quintessential TV Guide voice on race relations." All the positions she took on race in her articles, Efron is quoted as saying, "were determined by what I thought would be good for a young, vulnerable black child," a reflection of the issues which Efron herself had faced while bringing up a biracial son in the segregated America of the 1950s.

In 1971, Efron published The News Twisters, a controversial book which claimed to find media bias in the television news coverage of the 1968 U.S. presidential election, one of the first studies of its kind ever conducted. This was followed by her 1972 work, How CBS Tried to Kill a Book, an examination of CBS News's reaction to her study.

She was a contributing editor to Reason magazine from the 1970s until her death in 2001, where she wrote psychological studies of former President Bill Clinton and Supreme Court Justice Clarence Thomas. The latter prompted Justice Thomas to declare that Efron had been the "only person" to understand what was going through his mind during the hearings that made him a household name, according to Reason editor Virginia Postrel.

In 1984, Efron published The Apocalyptics, described as "an exposé of shoddy science and its effects on environmental policy," which systematically examined the regulatory "science" behind the banning of chemicals in consumer products, debunking the alleged "cancer epidemic" claimed to exist by many in the media.
