= The Six Pillars of Self-Esteem =

1994 self-help book by Nathaniel Branden

- Author: Nathaniel Branden
- Language: English
- Publisher: Bantam Books
- Publication date: 1994
- Publication place: United States
- Pages: 346

The Six Pillars of Self-Esteem is a psychology book written by Nathaniel Branden. The book describes what Branden believes are the key elements that raise or lower the self-esteem of an individual. Branden's six pillars are:

- The Practice of Living Consciously
- The Practice of Self-Acceptance
- The Practice of Self-Responsibility
- The Practice of Self-Assertiveness
- The Practice of Living Purposefully
- The Practice of Personal Integrity

== Reviews ==
The book received negative reviews from Library Journal, which called it "repetitive, verbose, and somewhat rambling", and Kirkus Reviews, which called it "Inflated and repetitious". Reason gave a positive review, calling Branden's exploration of self-esteem "an important mission for our time" and the book "a call to consciousness and participation".
