= Who Is Ayn Rand? =

1962 book by Nathaniel and Barbara Branden

Who is Ayn Rand?
- Cover of the first edition
- Authors: Nathaniel Branden; Barbara Branden
- Language: English
- Subject: Ayn Rand
- Publisher: Random House
- Publication date: 1962
- Publication place: United States
- Media type: Print (Hardcover and Paperback)
- Pages: 239 (first edition); 191 (1964 edition)
- ISBN: 0-394-45179-1
- OCLC: 313377536

Who Is Ayn Rand? is a 1962 book about the philosopher Ayn Rand by Nathaniel Branden and Barbara Branden. It comprises four essays addressing Rand's life and writings and her philosophy of Objectivism. The book's title essay is Barbara Branden's authorized biography of Rand. The Brandens subsequently repudiated the book, deeming its approach too uncritical toward Rand.

== Summary ==
The first section of the book contains three essays by Nathaniel Branden, under the heading "An Analysis of the Novels of Ayn Rand". The first discusses the ethical philosophy presented in Rand's novel Atlas Shrugged (1957). The second discusses the implications that Objectivism has for the field of psychology. The final essay in this section discusses Rand's literary techniques.

The book's second section contains a biographical essay of Rand by Barbara Branden, which was written with Rand's full cooperation and review.

== Background and publication history ==
At the time the book was written, Nathaniel and Barbara Branden had been close friends with Rand for over a decade. The couple worked through the Nathaniel Branden Institute and The Objectivist Newsletter to spread Rand's philosophical ideas. The book was inspired by a series of radio talks that Nathaniel Branden gave on radio station WBAI in New York. He suggested the idea of basing a book on the talk to Bennett Cerf, Rand's editor at Random House. Cerf suggested including a biographical essay about Rand. Nathaniel Branden turned this portion of the book over to his wife Barbara, who conducted a series of audiotaped private interviews with Rand to collect biographical information.

In 1968, several years after the publication of Who Is Ayn Rand?, Rand terminated her relationship with both Brandens. Subsequently, the Brandens repudiated their own book, saying the approach they took was too uncritical towards Rand.

The book was first published in June 1962 in a hardcover edition from Random House. A paperback edition was released in June 1964 by Paperback Library.

== Reception ==
Rand scholar Mimi Reisel Gladstein said Nathaniel Branden's essays are "illuminating", but the biography is limited because it required Rand's review and approval. Historian Jennifer Burns called it "hagiographic". In an essay accusing the Objectivist movement of being a cult, Murray N. Rothbard described the book as an "authorized exercise in uncritical adulation". Other critics of Rand have called it "gushingly adulatory" and "sycophantic".
