= Mary Gallagher =

American writer

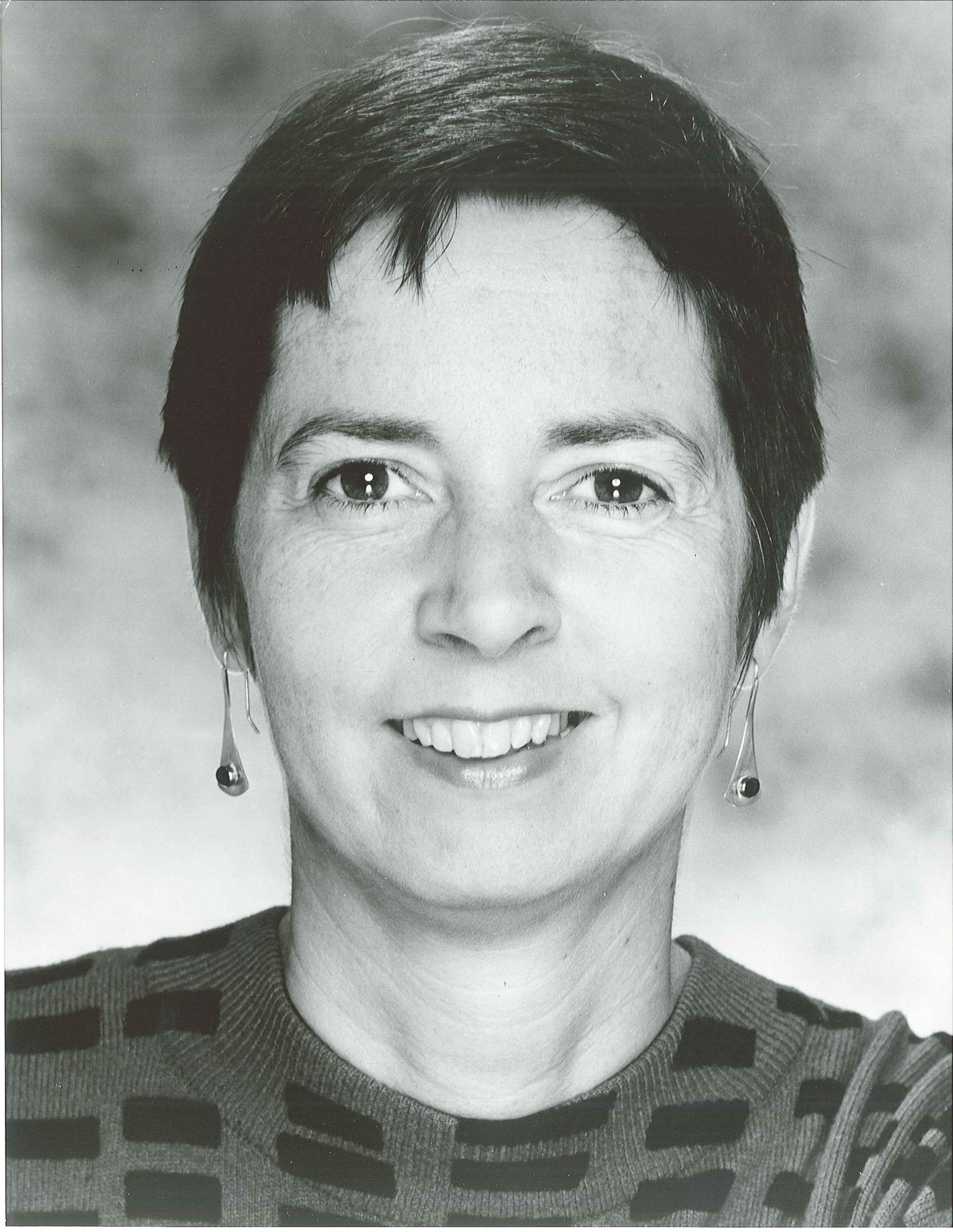
- Occupations: Playwright, screenwriter, novelist, actress, director, teacher

Mary Gallagher is an American playwright, screenwriter, novelist, actress, director and teacher. For six years, she was artistic director of Gypsy, a theatre company in the Hudson Valley, New York, which collaborated with many artists to create site-specific mask-and-puppet music-theatre with texts and lyrics by Gallagher. These pieces included Premanjali and the 7 Geese Brothers, Ama and The Scottish Play. In 1996-97, she directed the Playwrights Workshop at the University of Iowa, and she taught playwriting and screenwriting at New York University/Tisch School of the Arts from 2001 to 2010. She is a member of Actors & Writers, a theater company in the Hudson Valley, and the Ensemble Studio Theater in New York City. She is an alumna of New Dramatists, where she developed many of her plays and created and moderated the series, "You Can Make a Life: Conversations with Playwrights" from 1994 to 2001.

== Plays ==
Mary Gallagher’s plays Father Dreams, Little Bird, Chocolate Cake, Buddies, Dog Eat Dog, Love Minus, How To Say Goodbye, De Donde? and Windshook have been published by Dramatists Play Service and produced at such theatres as the American Conservatory Theater, Actors Theatre of Louisville, Hartford Stage Company, the Alley Theatre, the Main Street Theatre and the Cincinnati Playhouse; in NYC at the Vineyard Theatre, The American Place Theatre, the Ensemble Studio Theatre, the Women’s Project, HOME, the Provincetown Playhouse and the New York Shakespeare Festival; and in many other countries. "De Donde?" was published in American Theater in 1989. Windshook was published in New Plays from Act’s Young Conservatory Vol. I and Best Plays by Women 1996. Many of Gallagher’s short plays are anthologized, including Perfect, Sandwich, Brother and Bedtime.

== Screenplays ==
Her screenplays for Paramount, MGM, HBO, NBC, CBS, Lifetime, and Showtime include Nobody's Child (CBS), co-written by Ara Watson and directed by Lee Grant (Writers Guild Award, Emmy for Marlo Thomas); Bonds of Love (CBS), starring Treat Williams, Kelly McGilliss and Hal Holbrook (Best TV Movie of the Year, Banff International Television Festival); and The Passion of Ayn Rand, starring Helen Mirren, Peter Fonda and Eric Stoltz, which premiered at Sundance and aired on Showtime (Emmy for Mirren, Golden Globe for Fonda). Gallagher was also a staff writer for Jojo's Circus, a hit stop-motion animation show on the Disney Channel.

== Fellowships and honors ==
She has been awarded a Guggenheim Fellowship, a Rockefeller Fellowship, the Susan Smith Blackburn Prize, the Rosenthal New Play Prize, the Writers Guild Award, and three fellowships from the National Endowment for the Arts.

== Theatrical premiers ==
Most of these plays are in print and continue to be produced in the U.S. and other countries:

- Win/Lose/Draw (co-author Ara Watson) Spanish premiere, Palma de Mallorca, Spain, 2005.
- First Communion City Theatre, Miami, FL, 2004
- Farther Along. Musical with composer Louise Beach. Commissioned and produced by the University of New Hampshire, 2000.
- Love Minus. NYC: Players Club, 1998.
- The Scottish Play. Gypsy, Compost West, Capital Repertory Theatre, at the Masonic Temple, Albany, NY, 1998.
- AMA. Gypsy, MaskWork Unltd., Compost West, Kingston Point Park, NY, 1996.
- Premanjali and the Seven Geese Brothers. Gypsy & MaskWork Unltd., Widow Jane Cave, Rosendale, NY, 1994.
- Windshook. Young Conservatory & Professional Company, ACT, 1992, 1996.
- De Donde? Cincinnati Playhouse, 1990. NYC: New York Shakespeare Festival, 1990.
- Adultery, Brother. NYC: Home, 1988.
- Insomnia, Children of Dysfunctional Cooks
- How to Say Goodbye. Humana Festival, 1986. NYC: Vineyard Theatre, 1987.
- Bedtime. NYC: Ark Theatre Company, 1984.
- Special Family Things (co-author Ara Watson). NYC: Women’s Project, 1984.
- Dog Eat Dog. Hartford Stage Company, 1983.
- Buddies. NYC: Ensemble Studio Theatre, 1982.
- Chocolate Cake. Humana Festival, Actors Theatre of Louisville, 1981.
- (Win/Lose/Draw). NYC: Provincetown Playhouse, 1983.
- Little Bird. Berkshire Theatre Festival, 1980. NYC: 78th Street Theatre Lab, 1980.
- Father Dreams. American Conservatory Theater, 1978. Loretto Hilton Repertory Theatre, 1980. NYC: Ensemble Studio Theatre, 1981.
- Fly Away Home. American Conservatory Theater, 1977.
