= Paul Pearsall =

American psychologist, 1942–2007

- Born: 1942
- Died: July 13, 2007
- Education: University of Michigan, BA; Wayne State University, MA, PhD
- Occupations: Neuropsychologist, author
- Known for: Positive psychology; heart transplant personality research

Paul Pearsall (1942 – July 13, 2007) was an American neuropsychologist and author.

== Education ==
Pearsall was a 1963 graduate of the University of Michigan. His postgraduate degrees were earned at Wayne State University: a master's degree in Educational and Clinical Psychology in 1965, and a PhD in Clinical and Educational Psychology in 1968. His postdoctoral work included studies at United States Army War College, and the Arizona, Harvard, and Albert Einstein Schools of Medicine.

== Positive psychology ==
Pearsall is known for his work on positive psychology and often cites the role of emotions such as hope and love in surviving stress, depression, and psychological trauma. For instance, he introduced the notion of personal "strange attractors" drawn to each other to produce a bond that allows a couple to navigate life's obstacles. Several of his books explained how positive thinking, perseverance, and being authentic can be achieved by rearranging one's emotions and outlook, developing a heightened will in the process.

Pearsall is also known for counseling individuals who underwent heart transplantation and claimed that these patients experience significant and inexplicable changes in personality after the surgery, in which they became more like their donors in temperament and personal preferences.

== Death ==
Pearsall died of a spontaneous haemorrhagic stroke on July 13, 2007.

== Published works ==
- Super Joy, Doubleday Books, ISBN 978-0-385-24459-6
- Awe: The Delights and Dangers of Our Eleventh Emotion ISBN 978-0-7573-0585-6
- Ten Laws of Lasting Love, Simon & Schuster, ISBN 978-0-671-76798-3
- Sexual Healing: Using the Power of an Intimate, Loving Relationship to Heal Your Body and Soul, Crown Publishers ISBN 978-0-517-59440-7
- Toxic Success: How to Stop Striving and Start Thriving, Inner Ocean Publishing, ISBN 978-1-930722-09-5
- The Power of the Family, Doubleday Books, ISBN 978-0-385-26005-3
- The Last Self-Help Book You'll Ever Need: Repress Your Anger, Think Negatively, Be a Good Blamer, and Throttle Your Inner Child, Basic, ISBN 978-0-465-05486-2
- The Beethoven Factor: The New Positive Psychology of Hardiness, Happiness, Healing, and Hope, Hampton Roads Publishing Company, 2003, ISBN 978-1-57174-397-8
- The Heart's Code: Tapping the Wisdom and Power of Our Heart Energy, Broadway Books, 1999, ISBN 978-0-7679-0095-9
- Super Immunity: Master Your Emotions and Improve Your Health 1988, ISBN 978-0-449-13396-5
- Super Marital Sex, Futura, 1987, ISBN 978-0-385-24018-5
- Making Miracles, Prentice Hall Press, 1991, ISBN 978-0-13-089350-5
- The Pleasure Prescription: To Love, to Work, to Play-Life in the Balance, Hunter House Publishing, 1996, ISBN 978-0-89793-208-0
- Write Your Own Pleasure Prescription: 60 Ways to Create Balance and Joy in Your Life, Hunter House Publishers, 1997, ISBN 978-0-89793-229-5

== See also ==
- List of psychologists
- Cardiac psychology
- Heart transplantation
- Bruce Lipton
