= Nathaniel Branden =

Canadian-American psychotherapist (1930–2014)

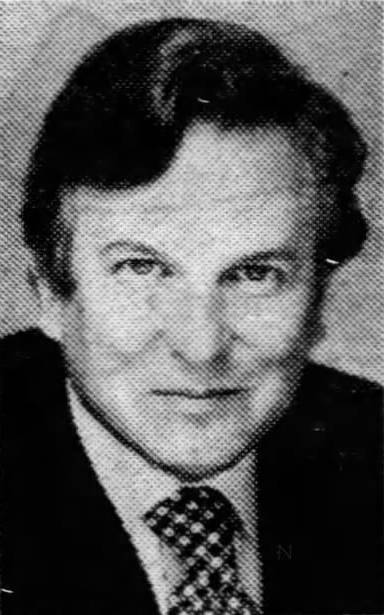
- Branden, c. 1972
- Born: Nathan Blumenthal; April 9, 1930; Brampton, Ontario, Canada
- Died: December 3, 2014 (aged 84); Los Angeles, California, U.S.
- Citizenship: United States
- Known for: Founder of self-esteem movement in psychology, former associate of Ayn Rand
- Spouses: Barbara Weidman (m. 1953; div. 1968); Patrecia Scott (née Gullison) (m. 1969; died 1977); Estelle Devers (m. 1978; div. 2003); Leigh Horton (m. 2006)
- Scientific career
- Fields: Psychotherapy

Nathaniel Branden (born Nathan Blumenthal; April 9, 1930 – December 3, 2014) was a Canadian–American psychotherapist and writer known for his work in the psychology of self-esteem. A former associate and romantic partner of Ayn Rand, Branden also played a prominent role in the 1960s in promoting Rand's philosophy, Objectivism. Rand and Branden split acrimoniously in 1968, after which Branden focused on developing his own psychological theories and modes of therapy.

== Early life and education ==
Nathaniel Branden was born Nathan Blumenthal in Brampton, Ontario, to Dinah (née Copp) and Joseph Blumenthal, who were Jewish immigrants from Russia. He grew up alongside three sisters, Florence, Elayne, and Reva. A gifted student, he became impatient with his studies during his first year of high school and skipped school often in favor of the library. After getting failing grades as a result, he convinced his mother to send him to a special accelerated high school for adults, and subsequently did well in that environment.

After graduating from high school, Branden went on to earn his BA in psychology from the University of California Los Angeles, an MA from New York University, and in 1973, a Ph.D. in psychology from the California Graduate Institute (CGI), then an unaccredited, state-approved school whose graduates may be licensed by the state to practice psychology. (Graduates of unaccredited state-approved schools such as CGI are limited to associate membership in the American Psychological Association.)

== Objectivist movement ==
In 1950, after he had read The Fountainhead and exchanged letters and phone calls with Ayn Rand, Branden and his then-girlfriend Barbara Weidman visited Rand and her husband Frank O'Connor at their Los Angeles home. The four became close friends, with Branden and Rand in particular sharing a vivid interest in philosophical exploration and development. After the publication of Rand's novel Atlas Shrugged, Branden sensed an interest on the part of Rand's readers in further philosophic education. In 1958, he created the Nathaniel Branden Lectures, later renamed the Nathaniel Branden Institute (NBI). The organization disseminated Rand's philosophy of Objectivism by offering live and taped lecture courses by a variety of Objectivist intellectuals, including Rand, Branden, and Alan Greenspan, whom Branden had brought into Rand's fold. During this time, Branden also contributed articles to Rand's newsletters on subjects ranging from economics to politics to psychology. Branden's work at NBI included translating the principles expressed by Rand in her fiction and non-fiction writing into a systematized construct that became known as Objectivism.

NBI expanded considerably over the course of its existence, ultimately offering courses in 80 cities and establishing an office in the Empire State Building. In 1968, Rand publicly broke with Branden and published an article denouncing him and accusing him of a variety of offenses, such as philosophic irrationality and unresolved psychological problems. In response, Branden sent out a letter to the NBI mailing list denying Rand's accusations and suggesting that the actual cause of Rand's denunciation of him was his unwillingness to engage in a romantic relationship with her. (Branden later explained in his memoir that he and Rand had in fact been romantically intimate for a period of time in the late 1950s; see personal life.)

After the break, Branden went on to publish The Psychology of Self-Esteem (many chapters of which he had published originally in Rand's newsletter), and then to develop his theory and mode of therapy more independently of Rand's influence. Though he remained supportive of the broad essentials of Rand's philosophy, he eventually offered criticisms of aspects of her work, naming as problems a tendency to encourage emotional repression and moralizing, a failure to understand psychology beyond its cognitive aspects, and a failure to appreciate adequately the importance of kindness in human relationships. He also apologized in an interview to "every student of Objectivism" for "perpetuating the Ayn Rand mystique" and for "contributing to that dreadful atmosphere of intellectual repressiveness that pervades the Objectivist movement."

== Psychology of self-esteem ==
Branden argued that self-esteem is a human psychological need and that to the extent this need remains unmet, pathology (defensiveness, anxiety, depression, difficulty in relationships, etc.) tends to result. He defined self-esteem formally as "the disposition to experience oneself as competent to cope with the basic challenges of life and as worthy of happiness", and proposed that, while others (parents, teachers, friends) can nurture and support self-esteem in an individual, self-esteem also relies upon various internally generated practices. These consisted, in Branden's framework, of six "pillars" of self-esteem:

- Living consciously: the practice of being aware of what one is doing while one is doing it, i.e., the practice of mindfulness.
- Self-acceptance: the practice of owning truths regarding one's thoughts, emotions, and behaviors; of being kind toward oneself with respect to them; and of being "for" oneself in a basic sense.
- Self-responsibility: the practice of owning one's authorship of one's actions and of owning one's capacity to be the cause of the effects one desires.
- Self-assertiveness: the practice of treating one's needs and interests with respect and of expressing them in appropriate ways.
- Living purposefully: the practice of formulating goals and of formulating and implementing action plans to achieve them.
- Personal integrity: the practice of maintaining alignment between one's behaviors and convictions.

In his book Taking Responsibility Branden defended voluntarism as a moral concept and libertarianism as a political one; likewise, individualism and personal autonomy are seen as essential to human freedom.

Branden distinguished his approach to self-esteem from that of many others by his inclusion of both confidence and worth in his definition of self-esteem, and by his emphasis on the importance of internally generated practices for the improvement and maintenance of self-esteem. For this reason, he at times expressed lack of enthusiasm about the teachings of the "self-esteem movement", which he is sometimes credited with having spawned (he was sometimes referred to as "the father of the self-esteem movement").

== Mode of therapy ==
While Branden began his practice of therapy as, primarily, a cognitivist, starting in the 1970s he rapidly shifted toward a decidedly technically eclectic stance, utilizing techniques from gestalt therapy, psychodrama, neo-Reichian bodywork as introduced to him by Dr. Charles Kelley, Ericksonian hypnosis, as well as original techniques such as his sentence completion method, which he favored. In a piece from 1973, he characterized his mode of therapy as consisting of four aspects: education, emotional unblocking, stimulation of insight, and encouragement of behavior change. In contrast to the exclusively experiential or exclusively cognitive (insight-oriented) methods of the day, Branden saw his mode of therapy as distinguished in part by "the integration of the emotional and the cognitive, the practice of constantly moving back and forth between the experiential and the conceptual."

Sentence completion, a method that figured prominently in Branden's mode of therapy, is an example of this dual focus. In its most common variation, it consists of a therapist giving a client an incomplete sentence—a sentence stem—and having the client repeat the sentence stem over and over, each time adding a new ending, going quickly, without thinking or censoring, and inventing endings when stuck. In this way, a therapist can facilitate the generation of awareness and insight (for example, with a stem such as, "If my fear could speak, it might say—"), and shifts in cognitive-motivational structure (for example, with a stem such as, "If I were to be kinder to myself when I'm afraid—"). By improvising a succession of such stems, many based on endings generated by a previous stem, a therapist can, according to Branden, lead a client on a sometimes dramatically emotional journey of self exploration and self-discovery.

Eventually, Branden integrated techniques from the field of energy psychology, such as Thought Field Therapy and Seemorg Matrix work, into his practice, viewing psychological trauma (which such techniques target) as a significant barrier to growth and development. He has described human problems as occurring both "above the line"—that is, in the realm of cognition and volitional behavior—and "below the line"—that is, in the realm of unconscious trauma stored in the body.

== Personal life ==
Branden married Barbara Weidman in 1953, with Rand and Rand's husband Frank O'Connor in attendance. Branden would later state the marriage was unwise, and troubled from the beginning. In the context of these troubles, and Rand's reported frustrations in her own marriage, Branden and Rand—who had a passionate philosophic bond—developed amorous feelings for each other and began a love affair in 1954. The affair lasted until the publication of Atlas Shrugged in 1957, after which, according to Branden, Rand became depressed, and the affair, practically speaking, ended.

Branden reported that in this period Rand began seeking a resumption of their affair; his own marriage, meanwhile, was deteriorating, although he and Barbara were becoming closer as friends. Branden then met and fell in love with a young model, Patrecia Scott (née Gullison). The two began a secret affair in 1964. In mid-1965, Nathaniel told Barbara of the affair and the two separated (and subsequently divorced). Despite Rand's romantic involvement with Nathaniel, her close intellectual collaboration with him, and her strong public endorsements of him, both Brandens kept Nathaniel's affair with Patrecia secret from Rand, fearing her reaction. In 1968, four years into the affair, Barbara Branden informed Rand of it. In response, Rand morally condemned the Brandens and dissociated herself from them in an article for her journal, The Objectivist, which, without revealing the existence of her romantic involvement with Branden, accused him of "deliberate deception" and financial misdealings in their business partnership.

Branden at this point moved to California with Patrecia; the two married in November 1969. In March 1977, Patrecia drowned accidentally, having fallen into a pool after presumably suffering a mild epileptic seizure. Branden subsequently married businesswoman (and later psychotherapist) Estelle Devers in December 1978. The two later divorced, though they remained friends. Branden subsequently married Leigh Horton.

Branden retained a relationship—sometimes friendly, sometimes acrimonious—with his first wife, Barbara, who wrote a successful biography, The Passion of Ayn Rand, which presented her version of Branden's relationship with Rand and the bitter breakup. The book was made into a motion picture in 1999 titled The Passion of Ayn Rand, starring Helen Mirren as Rand and Eric Stoltz as Branden. Branden went on to write his own memoir of the same events, Judgment Day: My Years with Ayn Rand, published in 1989.

Branden died on December 3, 2014, from complications of Parkinson's disease.

== Books ==
- Who is Ayn Rand? (with Barbara Branden) (1962)
- The Psychology of Self-Esteem (1969)
- Breaking Free (1970)
- The Disowned Self (1971)
- The Psychology of Romantic Love (1980)
- The Romantic Love Question & Answer Book (with Devers Branden) (1982) (later retitled What Love Asks Of Us)
- Honoring the Self (1983)
- If You Could Hear What I Cannot Say (1985)
- To See What I See and Know What I Know (1985) (later retitled The Art of Self Discovery)
- How To Raise Your Self-Esteem (1987)
- Judgment Day: My Years with Ayn Rand (1989)
- The Power of Self-Esteem (1992)
- The Art of Self Discovery (1993)
- The Six Pillars of Self-Esteem (1994)
- Taking Responsibility (1996)
- The Art of Living Consciously (1997)
- A Woman's Self-Esteem (1998)
- Nathaniel Branden's Self-Esteem Every Day (1998)
- Self-Esteem at Work (1998)
- My Years with Ayn Rand (1999) (revised edition of Judgment Day)
- 32nd Anniversary Edition of Psychology of Self-Esteem (2001)
- The Vision of Ayn Rand (2009) (book version of his "Basic Principles of Objectivism" lecture series)
- Layers (2020) (posthumous novel)

Branden's books have been translated into 18 languages, with more than 4 million copies in print. In addition, Branden contributed essays to two of Rand's essay collections, Capitalism: The Unknown Ideal and The Virtue of Selfishness.

== See also ==
- Objectivism and libertarianism
