= Barbara Branden =

Canadian writer (1929–2013)

- Publicity photo of Barbara Branden
- Born: Barbara Weidman; May 14, 1929; Winnipeg, Manitoba, Canada
- Died: December 11, 2013 (aged 84); Los Angeles, California, United States
- Occupation: Writer
- Spouse: Nathaniel Branden (divorced)
- Writing career
- Notable works: The Passion of Ayn Rand; Who Is Ayn Rand?
- Website: www.barbarabranden.com

Barbara Joan Branden (née Weidman; May 14, 1929 – December 11, 2013) was a Canadian-American writer, editor, and lecturer, known for her relationship and subsequent break with novelist-philosopher Ayn Rand.

== Life ==
Born in Winnipeg, Barbara Weidman met Nathaniel Branden because of their mutual interest in Ayn Rand's works. They became personal friends of Rand in 1950, and when they married in 1953, Rand and her husband, Frank O'Connor, served as the matron of honor and best man. She earned her M.A. in philosophy, and authored a thesis on free will, under the direction of Sidney Hook at New York University. Nathaniel and Barbara Branden became founding members of an Objectivist movement that sought to advance Rand's ideas.

In 1954, Nathaniel Branden began a secret romantic affair with Rand with the reluctant permission of both spouses. This relationship continued for three years. While their respective spouses, Barbara Branden and Frank O'Connor, had knowledge of the affair and nominally accepted it, Branden later said it led to "years of pain" and "enormous harm", describing it as a "sacrifice".

Barbara and Nathaniel Branden co-wrote Who Is Ayn Rand? in 1962. Barbara Branden's essay in the book was the first biography of Rand. When it was written, Rand considered Barbara Branden to be one of the most important proponents of Objectivism.

She served as the executive director of the Nathaniel Branden Institute, and gave a series of lectures on "Principles of Efficient Thinking."

In 1968, when Rand terminated her association with Nathaniel Branden after she discovered that he had become involved with actress Patrecia Scott more than four years earlier, she likewise disassociated herself from Barbara Branden for keeping this fact from her. The details of these events remain controversial.

In 1986, Barbara Branden published another biography of Rand, The Passion of Ayn Rand. The book, written after Rand's death in 1982, caused a rift among Rand's followers because it not only stated that Rand and Nathaniel Branden had been lovers, but that Rand had broken with them when she learned of his affair with Scott. Rand had previously claimed that the friendship broke up over other matters, but letters in her estate confirmed Barbara Branden's version of the cause. The book was made into an Emmy Award-winning motion picture in 1999 starring Helen Mirren as Rand, Eric Stoltz as Branden and Julie Delpy playing Barbara.

She contributed the lead essay "Ayn Rand: The Reluctant Feminist" to the anthology Feminist Interpretations of Ayn Rand, wherein she argued that the way Rand lived her life made it a feminist manifesto, even as Rand had disagreements with feminism. Barbara Branden was estranged from her cousin Leonard Peikoff, Rand's chosen intellectual and legal heir after Rand's break with Nathaniel Branden.

Barbara Branden died of a lung infection in Los Angeles on December 11, 2013. Branden had no children.

== Works ==
Books

- Branden, Barbara & Branden, Nathaniel (1964) [1962]. Who is Ayn Rand?. New York: Paperback Library. OCLC 2848682.
- Branden, Barbara (1986). The Passion of Ayn Rand. Garden City, NY: Doubleday. ISBN 0385191715.
- Branden, Barbara (2017). Think as if Your Life Depends on It: Principles of Efficient Thinking and Other Lectures. CreateSpace. ISBN 978-1548486679.

Lecture course

- Branden, Barbara (2007). Principles of Efficient Thinking (10 lectures). Reissued on 19 CDs.

== See also ==
- Atlas Shrugged
