= The Passion of Ayn Rand =

1986 biography by Barbara Branden

- Cover of the first edition
- Author: Barbara Branden
- Language: English
- Subject: Ayn Rand
- Publisher: Doubleday & Company
- Publication date: 1986
- Publication place: United States
- Media type: Print (hardcover and paperback)
- Pages: 442
- ISBN: 0-385-19171-5
- OCLC: 12614728

The Passion of Ayn Rand is a biography of Ayn Rand by writer and lecturer Barbara Branden, a former friend and business associate. Published by Doubleday in 1986, it was the first full-length biography of Rand and the basis for the 1999 film of the same name starring Helen Mirren as Rand.

== Background ==
Branden was a close associate of Rand's for 18 years. She and her husband, Nathaniel Branden, were leading figures in the Objectivist movement based on Rand's philosophy of Objectivism, and they operated the Nathaniel Branden Institute to promote Objectivism. In 1954, Rand began an extramarital affair with Nathaniel Branden. The breakdown of Rand's relationship with Nathaniel Branden in 1968 coincided with the closure of the Nathaniel Branden Institute and the expulsion of both Nathaniel and Barbara Branden from Rand's circle.

The Passion of Ayn Rand was an unauthorized biography intended to replace an earlier, authorized essay about Rand's life that Branden had written for the 1962 book Who Is Ayn Rand? Branden drew in part on the same audiotaped interviews with Rand that she had conducted for the earlier project. Branden also interviewed over 100 people who knew Rand during all phases of her life. The Passion of Ayn Rand also made the first public revelation of the affair between Rand and Nathaniel Branden. In an interview, Branden said that she had undertaken the book in part "to rescue [Rand] from the need to be godlike. As I wrote, she was much more than that: she was a human being and a woman .... it is only in that context that Objectivism can be separated from its founder and its supporters and be seen as a philosophy which stands or falls by its own relationship to reality – not by the virtues or vices of those who espouse it."

== Publication history ==
The book was first published in 1986 in a hardcover edition from Doubleday. A paperback edition was released by Anchor Books in 1987. In 1999 the book was adapted into a movie of the same name that aired on the Showtime Networks.

== Contents ==
The book is a chronological presentation of Rand's life, followed by an epilogue discussing the influence of Rand and her ideas. In the introduction to the book, the author summarized her point of view as follows: "Those who worship Ayn Rand and those who damn her do her the same disservice: they make her unreal and they deny her humanity. I hope to show in her story that she was something infinitely more fascinating and infinitely more valuable than either goddess or sinner. She was a human being. She lived, she loved, she fought her battles, she knew triumph and defeat. The scale was epic; the principle is inherent in human existence."

== Reception ==
=== Acclaim ===
One of the positive reviews that the book received, shortly after publication, came from Joseph Sobran: "...The Passion of Ayn Rand is an excellent book, especially for those (like me) who had their youthful fling with Objectivism. Mrs. Branden ... seems to harbor no rancor toward Miss Rand; in fact she still has enormous admiration for her ideas and celebrates her growing influence. But she admires Miss Rand on her (Mrs. Branden's) own terms."

George Gilder called the book "a superb biography written with much of the sweep, drama and narrative momentum of the great works of Ayn Rand herself – and with the psychological insight and sensitivity that forever eluded her ... [Branden] achieves a remarkable balance of intimacy and objectivity in telling the tempestuous story of a flawed but heroic woman, who bore the moral defense of capitalism on her back like Atlas for nearly two decades – and never shrugged."

Another early review came from the sociologist of religion Peter L. Berger. Although Berger was critical of Rand's antipathy to religion and of her "flat Enlightenment rationalism," he concluded, "And yet there is something appealing, even a touch of grandeur, about the figure who emerges from Ms. Branden's somewhat tortured account .... One can understand why this individual, whatever her intellectual and personal foibles, could command loyalty and inspire commitment."

Florence King included a section on Ayn Rand in her book With Charity toward None which quoted liberally from Branden's book; King also included The Passion of Ayn Rand on a list of books "I particularly enjoyed and recommend for general reading."

According to Mimi Reisel Gladstein, "Branden accomplishes a rare feat for biographers; she is able to illuminate the attractive and repellent aspects of Rand's personality, showing why so many would follow her unreservedly, while others reacted with abhorrence."

In a lengthy essay review, David Ramsay Steele declared that "The tale told by Barbara Branden is absolutely riveting. It is considered high praise to say of a book that, having once begun it, you can't put it down, but for me the more significant accolade is that having finished it you can't put it down, and that is certainly true of this amazing and fascinating story. It recounts Rand's life, partly on the basis of personal recollection and partly on the basis of detailed research." Steele complained, however, that the book makes excuses for its subject: "The attitude Branden has towards Rand is one that individuals generally hold only towards their parents: a burning anger, a rage for self-justification, contained by a rigid insistence that the parent is good and worthy."

=== Criticism ===
In a review that focused mainly on Ayn Rand's ideas, which he rejected, Terry Teachout declared that "Barbara Branden is an excruciatingly bad stylist, trapped in the throes of what Wolcott Gibbs used to call 'ladies'-club rhythm' .... But Mrs. Branden's hopeless style is offset by her intimate knowledge of the details of Ayn Rand's personal life."

Strongly negative reactions to The Passion of Ayn Rand have been expressed by some writers affiliated with the Ayn Rand Institute. According to Steele, "The orthodox Randists, led by Leonard Peikoff, have put it about that anyone who utters a word in praise of the book is to be shunned, boycotted, and cut off root and branch." In 1986 Peter Schwartz declared that The Passion of Ayn Rand is a tissue of arbitrary assertions: "Epistemologically, conclusions reached by a categorically non-objective method have the status of the arbitrary. They are not true and not false, but are, rather, entirely outside the cognitive realm – because they are not genuine attempts at cognition. Admirers of Ayn Rand need not – and should not – feel compelled to try to rebut each and every concrete charge made by Barbara Branden (and others who are sure to follow)." Peikoff pronounced that the biography was motivated by "venomous hatred" and agreed with Schwartz that its entire contents were "non-cognitive"; unlike Schwartz, however, he proclaimed that he had never read it and never intended to.

In 2005, James S. Valliant published a book-length negative review, The Passion of Ayn Rand's Critics, aiming to discredit The Passion of Ayn Rand on grounds of internal inconsistency, inconsistency with other available sources, and inconsistency with previously unpublished diary entries made by Rand in 1967 and 1968. Valliant partly concurred with Schwartz and Peikoff's judgment of arbitrariness, but he also claimed to have shown that much of what The Passion of Ayn Rand said about Rand's character and actions was false, and that it was "valueless" as a historical document.

In her 2009 biography of Rand, Goddess of the Market, historian Jennifer Burns says of the book that "Too often Branden takes Rand's stories about herself at face value, reporting as fact information contradicted by the historical record." She faults Branden for editorial tampering with Rand's statements in the taped interviews: "Sentences presented in quotes as if they were spoken verbatim by Rand have been significantly edited and rewritten." But she also notes that "Barbara and Nathan[iel] were privy to Rand's inner doubts, triumphs, and insecurities as were no others." She wrote that Valliant "often goes overboard" in his attack on Branden's biography and concluded in a retrospect the following year that the biography was largely accurate.
