= Nick Gaetano =

American artist

- Born: Colorado Springs, Colorado, U.S.
- Education: Art Center College of Design
- Known for: Cover art for The Fountainhead and Atlas Shrugged
- Style: Art Deco
- Website: nickgaetano.com

Nick Gaetano is an artist, known for creating the 25th Anniversary Edition cover art for works such as Ayn Rand: Atlas Shrugged, The Fountainhead, Anthem, We the Living, Philosophy: Who Needs It, Capitalism: the Unknown Ideal, For the New Intellectual, The Early Ayn Rand, The Romantic Manifesto, and The Virtue of Selfishness.

Gaetano also created The Ayn Rand Postage Stamp. In 2002, the original art for the Anniversary Editions of The Fountainhead and Atlas Shrugged, which Gaetano had sold to collectors in the 1980s for roughly $5,000 each, sold at auction for $118,000.

== Biography ==
Nick Gaetano was born in Colorado Springs, Colorado. He attended the Art Center College of Design where he received his education. He currently resides in Laguna Beach, California.

== Awards ==
Nick Gaetano received the following awards:

- Fellowship/ New Jersey State Council of the Arts
- Juror's Award/ American Annual Works on Paper/ Jane Livingston
- Juror's Award/ Expo 2003/ Dallas TX/ Vincent Falsetta
- Juror's Award / TVAA / Dallas TX - Nancy Whitenack
- Juror's Award / Best of Show /Rockwell Artists League / Ted Pillsbury
