= Ninety-Three =

1874 novel by Victor Hugo

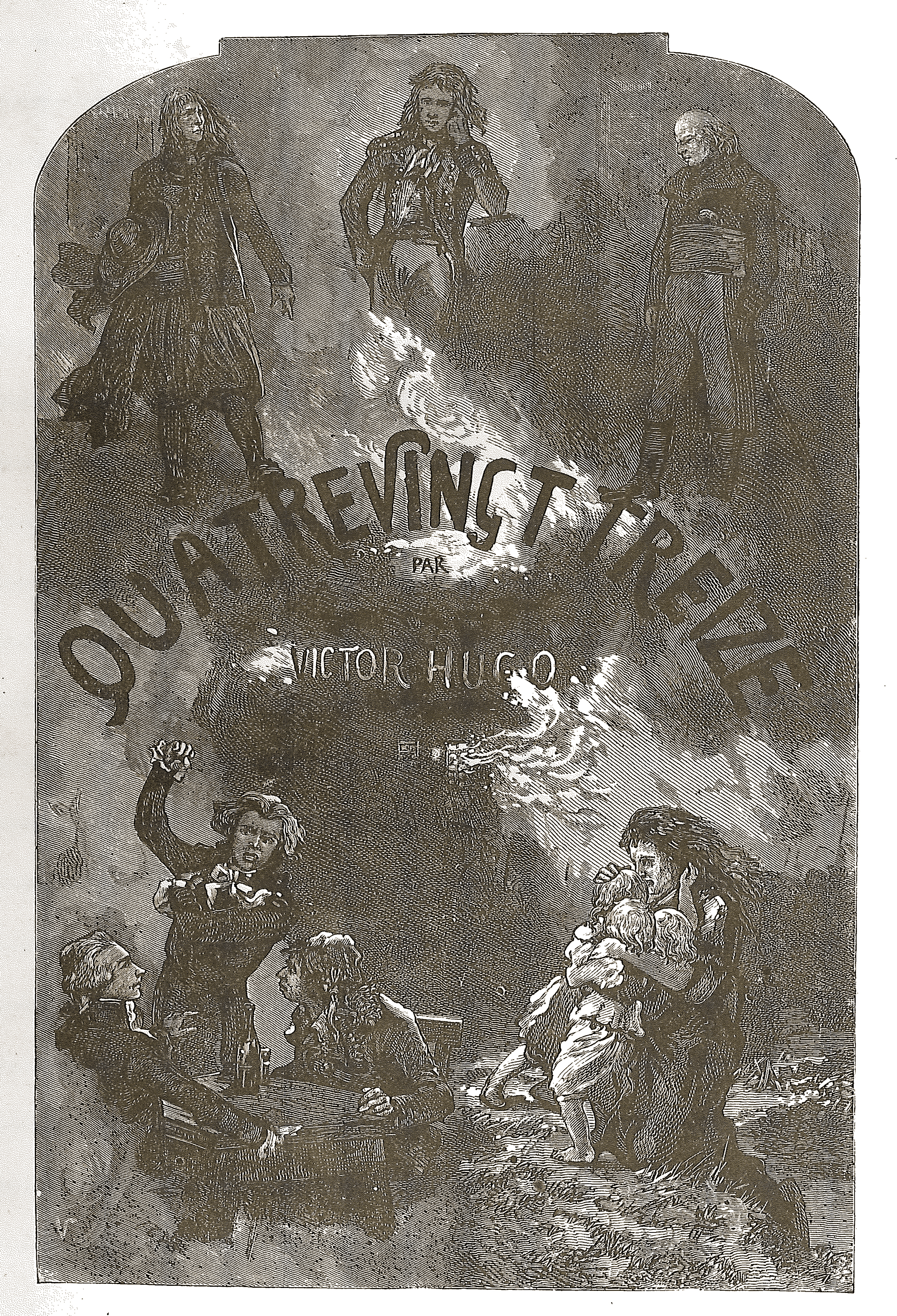
- 1st edition, 1874
- Author: Victor Hugo
- Original title: Quatrevingt-treize
- Translator: E. B. d'Espinville Picot
- Illustrator: Émile Bayard
- Language: French
- Publication date: 1874
- Publication place: France

Ninety-Three (Quatrevingt-treize) is the last novel by the French writer Victor Hugo. Published in 1874, three years after the bloody upheaval of the Paris Commune that resulted out of popular reaction to Napoleon III's failure to win the Franco-Prussian War, the novel concerns the Revolt in the Vendée and Chouannerie – the counter-revolutionary uprisings in 1793 during the French Revolution. It is divided into three parts, but not chronologically; each part tells a different story, offering a different view of historical general events. The action mainly takes place in Brittany and in Paris.

== Plot ==
The year is 1793. In the former Duchy of Brittany during the Royalist insurrection of the Chouannerie, a troop of "Blues" (soldiers of the French Revolutionary Army) encounter in the bocage Michelle Fléchard, a peasant woman, and her three young children, who are fleeing from the conflict. She explains that her husband and parents have been killed in the peasant revolt that started the insurrection. The troop's commander, Sergeant Radoub, convinces them to look after the family.

Meanwhile, at sea, a group of "Whites" (Royalist emigres) are preparing to land the Marquis de Lantenac (a thinly fictionalized combination of real Chouannerie leaders Charles Armand Tuffin, marquis de la Rouërie and Vincent de Tinténiac), a Breton aristocrat and former officer in the French Royal Army whose command experience could transform the fortunes of the rebellion. While at sea, a sailor fails to properly secure his cannon, which rolls out of control and damages the ship. When the same sailor risks his life to secure the cannon and save their ship, Lantenac awards the man a medal for his bravery and then executes him (without trial) for failing in his duty. Their corvette is spotted by ships of the Republic. Lantenac slips away in a boat with one supporter, Halmalo the brother of the executed sailor. The corvette distracts the Republican ships by provoking a naval battle the damaged ship cannot win. The corvette is destroyed, but Lantenac lands safely in Brittany and sends Halmalo ahead as a messenger.

Lantenac is hunted by the Blues, but is protected by a local beggar, to whom he gave alms in the past. He meets up with his supporters, and they immediately launch an attack on the Blues. Part of the troop with the family is captured. Lantenac orders them all to be shot, including Michelle. He takes the children with him as hostages. The beggar finds the bodies, and discovers that Michelle is still alive. He nurses her back to health.

Lantenac's leadership and methods turn the Breton uprising into a major threat to the First French Republic. In Paris, Danton, Robespierre and Marat argue about the threat, while also sniping at each other. They promulgate a decree that all rebels and anyone who helps them will be executed. Cimourdain, a committed revolutionary and former Roman Catholic priest, is deputed to carry out their orders in Brittany. He is also told to keep an eye on Gauvain, the commander of the Republican troops there, who is related to Lantenac and thought to be too lenient to rebels. Unknown to the revolutionary leaders, Cimourdain was Gauvain's childhood tutor, and thinks of him as a son.

Lantenac has taken control of Dol-de-Bretagne, in order to secure a landing place for British troops to be sent to support the Royalists. Gauvain launches a surprise attack and uses deception to dislodge and disperse them. Forced to retreat, Lantenac is constantly kept from reaching the coast by Gauvain. With British troops and supplies unavailable, Lantenac's supporters melt away. Eventually he and a last few followers are trapped in his castle.

Meanwhile, Michelle has recovered and goes in search of her children. She wanders aimlessly, but eventually hears that they are being held hostage in Lantenac's castle. At the castle Sergeant Radoub, fighting with the besiegers, spots the children. He persuades Gauvain to let him lead an assault. He manages to break through the defences and kill several rebels, but with Halmalo's aid, Lantenac and a few survivors escape through a secret passage after setting fire to the building. As the fire takes hold, Michelle arrives, and sees that her children are trapped. Her hysterical cries of despair are heard by Lantenac. Struck with guilt, he returns to the castle through the passage and rescues the children, helped by Radoub. He then gives himself up.

Gauvain knows that Cimourdain will guillotine Lantenac after a show trial. He visits him in prison, where Lantenac expresses his vision of French culture ordered by social hierarchy, deference, and duty. Gauvain insists that humane values transcend tradition. To prove it, he allows Lantenac to escape and then gives himself up to the revolutionary tribunal that was convened to try him. Gauvain's forgiveness and Lantenac's courageous act at the siege both contrast with the execution of the sailor at the beginning of the novel. Gauvain is then tried for treason. The tribunal comprises Cimourdain, Radoub and Gauvain's deputy, Guéchamp. Radoub votes to acquit, but the others vote to condemn Gauvain to be executed, with Cimourdain casting the deciding vote. Visited by Cimourdain in prison, Gauvain outlines his own vision of a future society with minimal government, no taxes, technological progress and sexual equality. The following morning he is executed by guillotine. At the same moment, Cimourdain shoots himself.

== Writing and reception ==
While Hugo clearly favours the revolutionaries in several comments by the omniscient narrator, neither side is depicted as opportunistic, mercenary or cynical. Republicans and Royalists are depicted as idealistic, high-minded, completely devoted to their antagonistic causes and ready to perform cruel and ruthless acts perceived as necessary in the ongoing titanic struggle. Hugo was criticised for portraying the Bretons as "savages" and as speaking "a dead language".

Joseph Stalin read Ninety-Three as a young seminarian in Georgia and the character of Cimourdain, a former priest, "made a deep impression" on him.

Herbert Butterfield expressed admiration for Ninety-Three in his essay The Historical Novel (1924), describing the book as "a striking example of the epic of national freedom".

Ayn Rand greatly praised this book (and Hugo's writing in general), acknowledged it as a source of inspiration, and even wrote an introduction to one of its English-language editions which was later reprinted with edits as an essay in The Romantic Manifesto. Its influence can be especially discernible in the passages describing the Russian Civil War in Rand's We the Living—where, uncharacteristically for this staunchly anti-Communist writer, "Reds" as well as "Whites" are recognized for the sincerity of their convictions and presented as courageous and heroic.
