= Capitalism: The Unknown Ideal =

1966 book by Ayn Rand

- Cover of the first edition
- Author: Ayn Rand
- Language: English
- Subjects: Capitalism; Political philosophy
- Publisher: New American Library
- Publication date: 1966 (1st edition); 1967 (2nd edition)
- Publication place: United States
- Media type: Print (hardcover and paperback)
- Pages: 309 (1st edition); 349 (2nd edition)
- ISBN: 978-0-451-14795-0
- OCLC: 24916193

Capitalism: The Unknown Ideal is a collection of essays, mostly by the Russian-born American philosopher Ayn Rand, with additional essays by her associates Nathaniel Branden, Alan Greenspan, and Robert Hessen. The authors focus on the moral nature of laissez-faire capitalism and private property. They have a very specific definition of capitalism, a system they regard as broader than simply property rights or free enterprise. It was originally published in 1966.

== Summary ==
Rand intended Capitalism: The Unknown Ideal to focus on the moral nature of capitalism, as opposed to focusing on its economic aspects. She contrasts this with what she says is the failure of most other defenders of capitalism to provide a moral defense of that system.

After an introduction by Rand, the book is divided into two main sections. The first section, "Theory and History", contains essays that focus on the theoretical basis for capitalism and historical arguments related to it. This section includes essays arguing against common objections to capitalism. The second section, "Current State", focuses on contemporary political issues from the 1960s. The topics covered in this section include the Vietnam War, student protests, and the papal encyclical Populorum progressio. An "Appendix" section reprints two essays on political theory previously published in Rand's earlier book, The Virtue of Selfishness. A recommended reading list about capitalism is also provided.

== Themes ==
Rand applies her philosophy of Objectivism to the subject of politics. When Rand talks of capitalism, she means laissez-faire capitalism, in which there is a complete separation of state and economics "in the same way and for the same reasons as the separation of church and state". Rand says, "Objectivists are not 'conservatives'. We are radicals for capitalism; we are fighting for that philosophical base which capitalism did not have and without which it was doomed to perish." Rand says that most people do not know what capitalism is, which is why it is "the unknown ideal".

=== What is capitalism? ===
As understood by Rand, capitalism is the system that emerges among a group of free individuals, each applying time and reason to sustain his or her own life, each the owner of the means to do so, freely trading among themselves. Rand regarded a mixed economy as a dangerous and unstable combination of freedom and controls that tends to develop into ever increasing statism.

=== Reason and values ===
Rand held capitalism to be the only moral social system, that is, one consistent with an objective theory of value and ethical individualism. According to Rand, the creation of wealth is a fusion of mind and matter, and she argued that reason is the most fundamental tool of survival for human beings; however, rational thought is rendered inoperative under conditions of compulsion, coercion, or as she puts it, the initiation of physical force. Whether it is the force of an armed robber or the force of a law, an actor's own judgment is rendered irrelevant to his actions by a threat of force, compelling him to act on the judgment or will of another, thus neutralizing the source of wealth and survival itself. Only voluntary trade can ensure that human interaction is mutually beneficial, and an analysis of history shows that only economic and political freedom has worked to create significant growth and economic development, precisely by liberating the rational faculties of ever wider numbers of individuals, according to Rand.

=== Individual rights ===
In its most basic form, the right to life (as understood by Rand) is the right of each human to do any and all activities necessary to sustain his or her own life. Rand further argued that one's selfish interests can never rationally entail the use of physical force or violence against the person or the property of another. Rand saw humans as thriving only as independent beings, reason being a faculty of the individual, with each freely expending their time, effort, and reason to sustain their own life.

Rand suggested that through the division of labor, specialization, and voluntary trade, other people are of enormous value to an individual. Moreover, knowledge, skills, and interests vary from human to human. One person may be better at shaping flint into arrowheads, another may have acquired the skill to turn mud into pottery. If the first wants a pot to cook in, he or she may trade an arrowhead for a pot. The central feature of free trade is that each participant judges that he or she has gained from the transaction.

According to Rand, when physical force is banned, persuasion alone can organize or coordinate human activity, and, consequently, the use of reason is both liberated and rewarded. The technological innovation which characterizes capitalist systems is thus directly related to conditions of economic freedom. A producer profits and becomes wealthy only by satisfying the voluntary choices of other market participants and in direct proportion to the value those participants find in transactions with that producer. In this way, individuals who themselves could have never invented, for example, the light bulb or the steam engine can nonetheless benefit from the creativity of others; this can be only ensured when both the innovator and the consumer are free to refuse the proposed trade. According to Rand, this is the mechanism behind America's rapid economic development, its liberation of human reason.

Freedom being the primary condition for the practical use of reason, the role of government in protecting individual rights is therefore fundamental, according to Rand, and it is equally fundamental that the government itself be limited to its role of protecting rights, for only by rendering all human interaction voluntary, i.e. free from the initiated coercion of criminals and laws, can the market operate to radically improve the lives of everyone. To the extent that it has been permitted to operate, this is what a free market has done, argued Rand. Thus, she held that "a free mind and a free market are corollaries".

== Publication history ==
Most of the essays originally appeared in The Objectivist Newsletter or The Objectivist. The hardcover first edition was published by New American Library in 1966. When the book was published in paperback in 1967, it was revised to include two additional essays. In 1970, Rand revised the introduction to reflect her break with Nathaniel Branden.

== Reception and influence ==
Compared to Rand's earlier books, Capitalism: The Unknown Ideal received relatively few reviews. The Freeman, which had previously published some of Rand's essays that were used in the book, says the book addresses "myths" and "bromides" used against capitalism using "unique arguments" that deserve to be read. A positive review appeared in the Houston Chronicle, and Barron's Magazine published a review by Rand's associate Leonard Peikoff. A negative review appeared in Book Week, and another negative review, in The New Republic, was titled "Here We Go Gathering Nuts".

Economist Walter E. Williams has described the work as "one of the best defenses and explanations of capitalism one is likely to read". A number of American libertarian activists and scholars have described the book as being a key influence in developing their support for free markets, including John A. Allison, Tyler Cowen, Marc Emery, James Ostrowski, Joseph T. Salerno, Chris Matthew Sciabarra, and Larry J. Sechrest. As of 2008, the book had sold over 600,000 copies.
