= The Early Ayn Rand =

1984 Ayn Rand anthology

- Cover of the first edition
- Editor: Leonard Peikoff
- Author: Ayn Rand
- Language: English
- Publisher: New American Library
- Publication date: 1984 (1st ed.); 2005 (revised ed.)
- Publication place: United States
- Media type: Print (hardback & paperback)
- Pages: 383 (1st ed.); 528 (revised ed.)
- ISBN: 0-453-00465-2 (1st ed.)
- OCLC: 10457178

The Early Ayn Rand: A Selection from Her Unpublished Fiction is an anthology of unpublished early fiction written by the Russian-born American author Ayn Rand, first published in 1984, two years after her death. The selections include short stories, plays, and excerpts of material cut from her novels We the Living and The Fountainhead.

== Publishing history ==
Author Ayn Rand died in March 1982, after a long career that included four published novels, two Broadway plays, several produced screenplays, and numerous non-fiction essays and speeches. She left her literary estate, including her unpublished manuscripts, to her longtime friend and protégé Leonard Peikoff. Peikoff compiled a selection of her unpublished fiction into The Early Ayn Rand. Although many of the pieces included were never meant to be published, the collection shows Rand's development as a writer. In the introduction, Peikoff writes he "decided to publish this material because I believe that admirers of Miss Rand will be interested to learn by what steps she developed her literary abilities. They can now see the steps themselves."

This book is volume two of the "Ayn Rand Library" series edited by Peikoff. It was first published in a hardcover edition by New American Library in 1984. They published paperback edition in 1986. A revised and expanded edition was published in 2005.

== Contents ==
The first edition begins with four unpublished short stories written in the 1920s. The next section starts with a synopsis of Red Pawn, a 1932 screenplay that was Rand's first professional sale as a writer. This is followed by unpublished excerpts from Rand's first novel, We the Living, which was completed in 1934 and published in 1936. The section ends with a previously unpublished and unproduced play, Ideal, which was written in the mid-1930s. (Ideal was later produced in 1989 by Michael Paxton.)

The third section begins with Think Twice, a theatrical murder mystery written in 1939. Peikoff writes that in conversation about this play, Rand told him "She could not ... write a series of mysteries, because everyone would know who the murderers were." It is followed by unpublished excerpts from Rand's 1943 novel The Fountainhead – especially, the sections describing the relationship of the protagonist Howard Roark with actress Vesta Dunning, an episode of considerable importance in the original text and removed from the final version.

The revised edition adds two short stories. "The Night King" was a previously unpublished story written in around 1926. "The Simplest Thing in the World" was written in 1940 and previously published in a 1967 issue of The Objectivist and in Rand's 1969 book The Romantic Manifesto.

== Reception ==
Upon its initial publication in 1984, the book received only a few reviews, which were mostly positive. These included reviews in the Los Angeles Times and the Detroit Free Press. In a review for the libertarian magazine Reason, literature professor Stephen D. Cox said the collection was "very interesting" and revealed details of Rand's personality, although the writing in the selections was inferior to her previously published work.

Looking back on the book years later, Rand scholar Mimi Reisel Gladstein said reading it is "a pleasurable experience" that shows Rand's "nascent virtuosity". In her article about Rand for Contemporary Women Philosophers, Jenny Heyl said the selections show Rand's "strong flair for the dramatic" and foreshadow themes from her later work.
