= Sechrest =

Sechrest is a surname. Notable people with the surname include:

- Donald Sechrest (1933–2006), American golfer and golf course architect
- Jason Sechrest (born 1979), American writer and actor
- Larry J. Sechrest (1946–2008), American economist
- Lee Sechrest (1929–2015), American psychologist
