= Ayn Rand =

Russian-American philosopher (1905–1982)

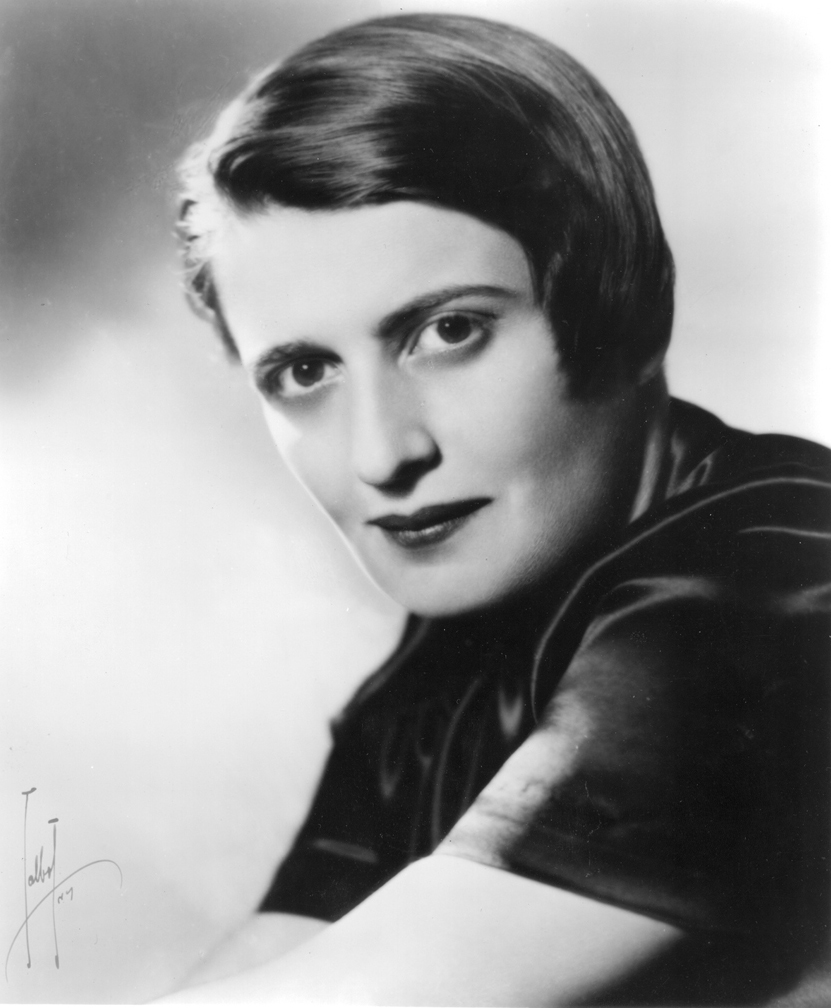
- Rand in 1943
- Born: Alisa Zinovyevna Rosenbaum (Note: Russian: Алиса Зиновьевна Розенбаум, [ɐˈlʲisə zʲɪˈnovʲjɪvnə rəzʲɪnˈbaʊm]. Most sources transliterate her given name as either Alisa or Alissa.); February 2, 1905; Saint Petersburg, Russia
- Died: March 6, 1982 (aged 77); New York City, U.S.
- Citizenship: Russia (until 1931) (Note: Rand's initial citizenship was in the Russian Empire and continued through the Russian Republic and the Russian Soviet Federative Socialist Republic, which became part of the Soviet Union.); U.S. (from 1931)
- Education: Leningrad State University
- Occupations: Author; philosopher
- Spouse: Frank O'Connor (m. 1929; died 1979) (Note: Rand's husband, Charles Francis O'Connor (1897–1979), is not to be confused with the actor and director Frank O'Connor (1881–1959) or the writer whose pen name was Frank O'Connor.)
- Writing career
- Pen name: Ayn Rand
- Language: English; Russian
- Period: 1934–1982
- Notable work: Full list

Alice O'Connor (born Alisa Zinovyevna Rosenbaum; February 2 [O.S. January 20], 1905 – March 6, 1982), better known by her pen name Ayn Rand (/aɪn/), was a Russian-American writer and philosopher. She is known for her fiction and for developing a philosophical system which she named Objectivism.

Born and educated in Russia, she moved to the United States in 1926. After two early novels that were initially unsuccessful and two Broadway plays, Rand achieved fame with her 1943 novel The Fountainhead. In 1957, she published her best-selling work, the novel Atlas Shrugged. Afterward, until her death in 1982, she turned to non-fiction to promote her philosophy, publishing her own periodicals and releasing several collections of essays.

Rand advocated reason and rejected faith and religion. She supported rational and ethical egoism as opposed to altruism and hedonism. In politics, she condemned the initiation of force as immoral and supported laissez-faire capitalism, which she defined as the system based on recognizing individual rights, including private property rights. Although she opposed libertarianism, which she viewed as anarchism, Rand is often associated with the modern libertarian movement in the United States. In art, she promoted romantic realism. She was sharply critical of most philosophers and philosophical traditions known to her, with a few exceptions.

Rand's books have sold over 37 million copies. (Note: This total includes 4.5 million copies purchased for free distribution to schools by the Ayn Rand Institute (ARI).) Her fiction received mixed reviews from literary critics, with reviews becoming more negative for her later work. Although academic interest in her ideas has grown since her death, academic philosophers have generally ignored or rejected Rand's philosophy, arguing that she has a polemical approach and that her work lacks methodological rigor. Her writings have politically influenced some right-libertarians and conservatives, although she has also been criticized by some like William F. Buckley Jr., founder of the National Review, who wrote that Rand did not belong in the conservative movement. She personally criticized conservatives as "intellectual bankrupts." The Objectivist movement circulates her ideas, both to the public and in academic settings.

== Life and career ==
=== Early life ===
Rand was born Alisa Zinovyevna Rosenbaum on February 2, 1905, into a Jewish bourgeois family living in Saint Petersburg, the Russian Empire's capital. She was the eldest of three daughters born to Zinovy Zakharovich Rosenbaum, a pharmacist, and Anna Borisovna (née Kaplan). She was 12 when the October Revolution and the rule of the Bolsheviks under Vladimir Lenin disrupted her family's lives. Her father's pharmacy was nationalized, and the family fled to Yevpatoria in Crimea, which was initially under the control of the White Army during the Russian Civil War. After graduating from high school there in June 1921, she returned with her family to Petrograd, as Saint Petersburg was then named, (Note: The city was renamed Petrograd from the Germanic Saint Petersburg in 1914 because Russia was at war with Germany. In 1924 it was renamed Leningrad. The name Saint Petersburg was restored in 1991.) where they faced desperate conditions, occasionally nearly starving.

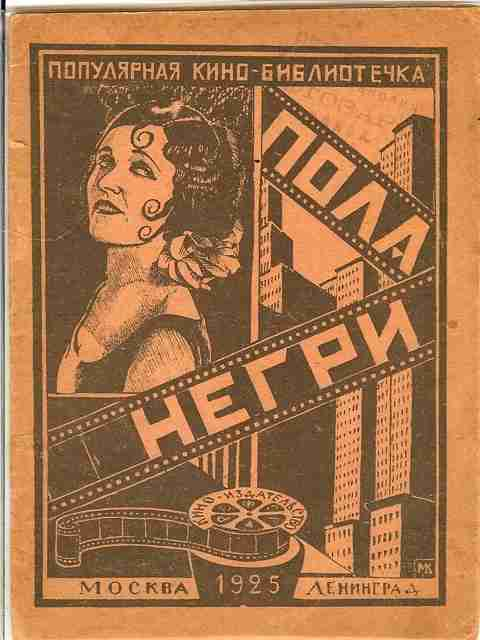
Rand's first published work was a monograph in Russian about actress Pola Negri.

After the Russian Revolution opened up Russian universities to women, Rand was among the first to enroll at Petrograd State University. At 16, she began her studies in the department of social pedagogy, majoring in history. She was one of many bourgeois students purged from the university shortly before graduating. After complaints from a group of visiting foreign scientists, many purged students, including Rand, were reinstated.

In October 1924, she graduated from the renamed Leningrad State University. She then studied for a year at the State Technicum for Screen Arts in Leningrad. For an assignment, Rand wrote an essay about Polish actress Pola Negri. It became her first published work. She decided her professional surname for writing would be Rand, and she adopted the first name Ayn (pronounced /aɪn/). (Note: She may have taken Rand as her surname because it is graphically similar to a vowelless excerpt Рзнб of her birth surname Розенбаум in Cyrillic. Rand said Ayn was adapted from a Finnish name. Some biographical sources question this, suggesting it may come from a nickname based on the Hebrew word עין (ayin, meaning 'eye'). Letters from Rand's family do not use such a nickname.)

In late 1925, Rand was granted a visa to visit relatives in Chicago, Illinois. She arrived in New York City on February 19, 1926. Intent on staying in the United States to become a screenwriter, she lived for a few months with her relatives learning English, before moving to Hollywood, Los Angeles, California.

In Hollywood, a chance meeting with director Cecil B. DeMille led to work as an extra in his film The King of Kings and a subsequent job as a junior screenwriter. While working on The King of Kings, she met the aspiring actor Frank O'Connor. They married on April 15, 1929. She became a permanent American resident in July 1929 and an American citizen on March 3, 1931. (Note: Rand's immigration papers anglicized her given name as Alice; her legal married name became Alice O'Connor, but she did not use that name publicly or with friends.) She tried to bring her parents and sisters to the United States, but they could not obtain permission to emigrate. Rand's father died of a heart attack in 1939. One of her sisters and their mother died during the siege of Leningrad.

=== Early fiction ===
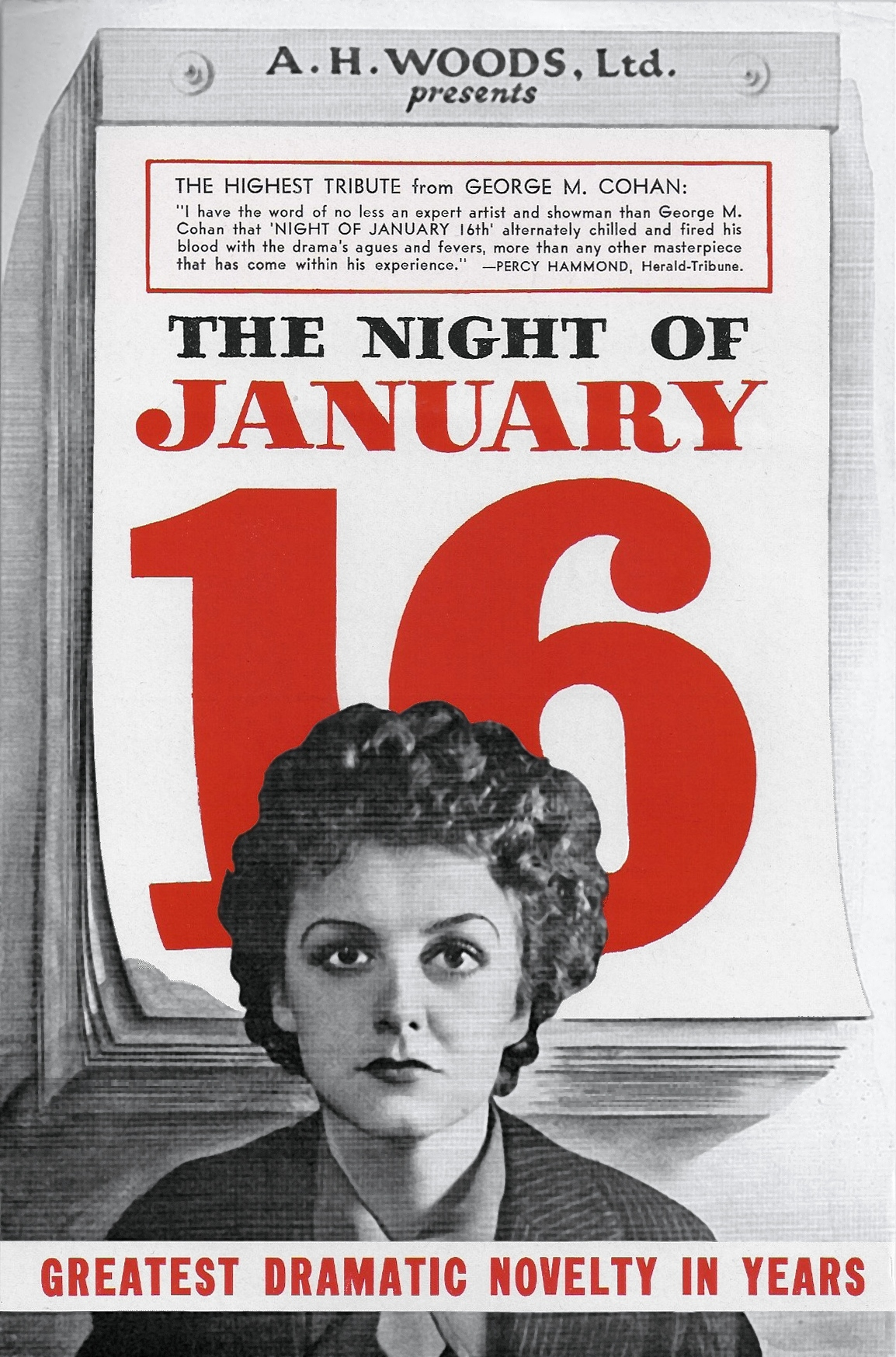
Rand's play Night of January 16th opened on Broadway in 1935.

In 1932, Rand's first literary success was the sale of her screenplay Red Pawn to Universal Studios, although it was never produced. (Note: It was later published in The Early Ayn Rand along with other screenplays, plays, and short stories that were not produced or published during her lifetime.) Her courtroom drama Night of January 16th, first staged in Hollywood in 1934, reopened successfully on Broadway in 1935. Each night, a jury was selected from members of the audience. Based on its vote, one of two different endings would be performed. (Note: In 1941, Paramount Pictures produced a movie loosely based on the play. Rand did not participate in the production and was highly critical of the result.) In December 1934, Rand and O'Connor moved to New York City so she could handle revisions for the Broadway production.

In 1936, Rand's first novel was published, the semi-autobiographical We the Living. Set in Soviet Russia, it focuses on the struggle between the individual and the state. Initial sales were slow, and the American publisher let it go out of print; however, European editions continued to sell. She adapted the story as a stage play, but the Broadway production closed in less than a week. (Note: In 1942, the novel was adapted without permission into a pair of Italian films, Noi vivi and Addio, Kira. After Rand's post-war legal claims over the piracy were settled, the films were re-edited with her approval and released as We the Living in 1986.) After the success of her later novels, Rand released a revised version in 1959 that has sold over three million copies.

In December 1935, Rand started her next major novel, The Fountainhead, but took a break from it in 1937 to write her novella Anthem. The novella presents a dystopian future world in which totalitarian collectivism has triumphed to such an extent that the word I has been forgotten and replaced with we. Protagonists Equality 7-2521 and Liberty 5-3000 eventually escape the collectivistic society and rediscover the word I. It was published in England in 1938, but Rand could not find an American publisher at that time. As with We the Living, Rand's later success allowed her to get a revised version published in 1946; this edition sold over 3.5 million copies.

=== The Fountainhead and political activism ===
In the 1940s, Rand became politically active. She and her husband were full-time volunteers for Republican Wendell Willkie's 1940 presidential campaign. This work put her in contact with other intellectuals sympathetic to free-market capitalism. She became friends with journalist Henry Hazlitt, who introduced her to the Austrian School economist Ludwig von Mises. Despite philosophical differences with them, Rand strongly endorsed the writings of both men; they also expressed admiration for her. Mises once called her "the most courageous man in America", a compliment that particularly pleased her because he said "man" instead of "woman". Rand became friends with libertarian writer Isabel Paterson. Rand questioned her about American history and politics during their many meetings, and gave Paterson ideas for her only non-fiction book, The God of the Machine. (Note: Their friendship ended in 1948 after Paterson made what Rand considered rude comments to valued political allies.)

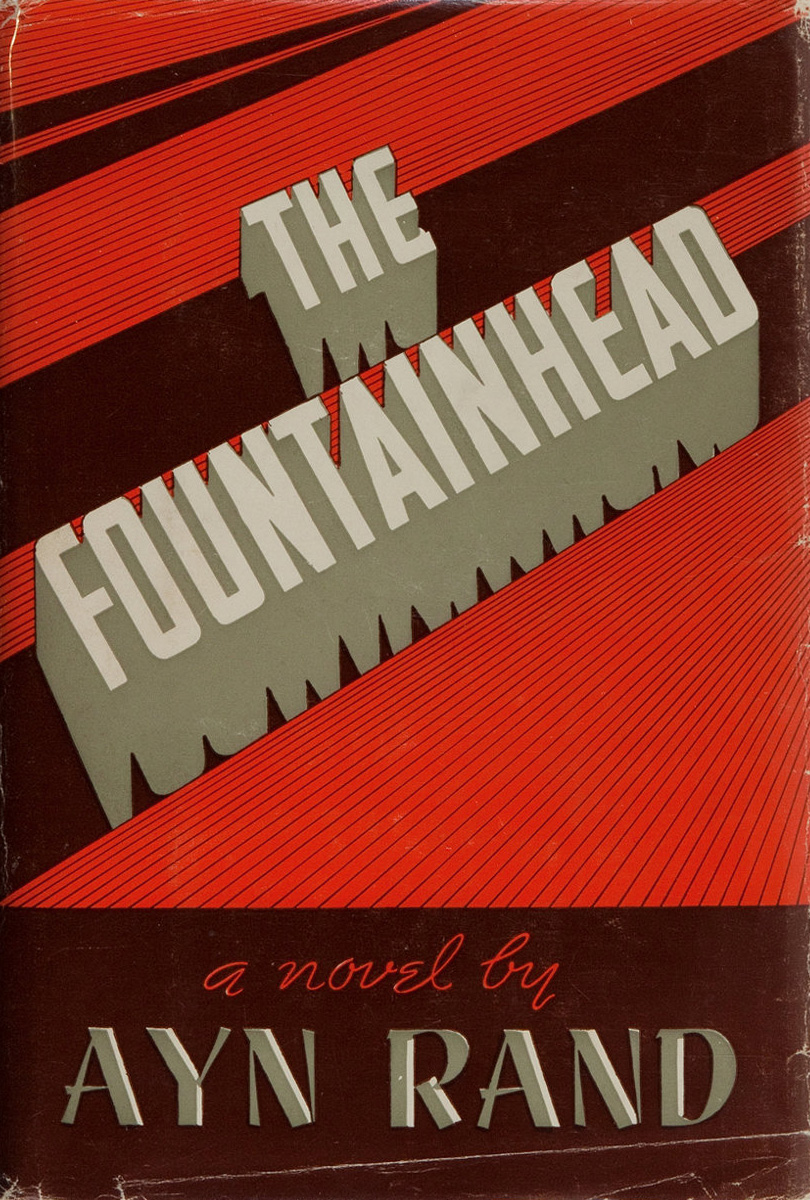
The Fountainhead was Rand's first bestseller.

In 1943, Rand's first major success as a writer came with The Fountainhead, a novel about an uncompromising architect named Howard Roark and his struggle against what Rand described as "second-handers" who attempt to live through others, placing others above themselves. Twelve publishers rejected it before Bobbs-Merrill Company accepted it at the insistence of editor Archibald Ogden, who threatened to quit if his employer did not publish it.

While completing the novel, Rand was prescribed Benzedrine, an amphetamine, to fight fatigue. The drug helped her to work long hours to meet her deadline for delivering the novel; afterwards, however, she was so exhausted that her doctor ordered two weeks' rest. Her use of the drug for approximately three decades may have contributed to mood swings and outbursts described by some of her later associates.

The success of The Fountainhead brought Rand fame and financial security. In 1943, she sold the film rights to Warner Bros. and returned to Hollywood to write the screenplay. Producer Hal B. Wallis then hired her as a screenwriter and script-doctor for screenplays including Love Letters and You Came Along. Rand became involved with the anti-Communist Motion Picture Alliance for the Preservation of American Ideals and American Writers Association.

In 1947, during the Second Red Scare, she testified as a "friendly witness" before the United States House Committee on Un-American Activities that the 1944 film Song of Russia grossly misrepresented conditions in the Soviet Union, portraying life there as much better and happier than it was. She also wanted to criticize the lauded 1946 film The Best Years of Our Lives for what she interpreted as its negative presentation of the business world but was not allowed to do so. When asked after the hearings about her feelings on the investigations' effectiveness, Rand described the process as "futile".

In 1949, after several delays, the film version of The Fountainhead was released. Although it used Rand's screenplay with minimal alterations, she "disliked the movie from beginning to end" and complained about its editing, the acting and other elements.

=== Atlas Shrugged and Objectivism ===
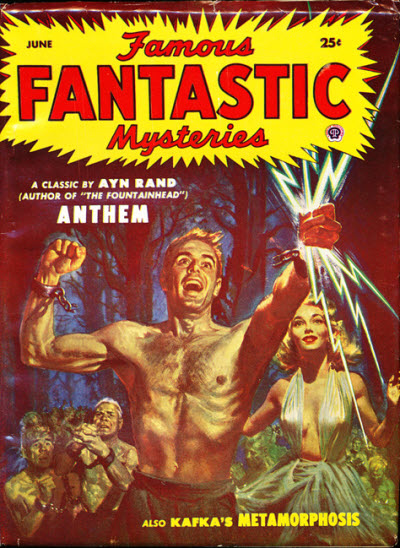
Rand's novella Anthem was reprinted in the June 1953 issue of the pulp magazine Famous Fantastic Mysteries.

Following the publication of The Fountainhead, Rand received many letters from readers, some of whom the book had influenced profoundly. In 1951, Rand moved from Los Angeles to New York City, where she gathered a group of these admirers who met at Rand's apartment on weekends to discuss philosophy. The group included future chair of the Federal Reserve Alan Greenspan, a young psychology student named Nathan Blumenthal (later Nathaniel Branden) and his wife Barbara, and Barbara's cousin Leonard Peikoff. Later, Rand began allowing them to read the manuscript drafts of her new novel, Atlas Shrugged.

In 1954, her close relationship with Nathaniel Branden turned into a romantic affair. They informed both their spouses, who briefly objected, until Rand "sp[u]n out a deductive chain from which you just couldn't escape", in Barbara Branden's words, resulting in her and O'Connor's assent. Historian Jennifer Burns concludes that O'Connor was likely "the hardest hit" emotionally by the affair.

Published in 1957, Atlas Shrugged is considered Rand's magnum opus. She described the novel's theme as "the role of the mind in man's existence—and, as a corollary, the demonstration of a new moral philosophy: the morality of rational self-interest". It advocates the core tenets of Rand's philosophy of Objectivism and expresses her concept of human achievement. The plot involves a dystopian United States in which the most creative industrialists, scientists, and artists respond to a welfare state government by going on strike and retreating to a hidden valley where they build an independent free economy. The novel's hero and leader of the strike, John Galt, describes it as stopping "the motor of the world" by withdrawing the minds of individuals contributing most to the nation's wealth and achievements. The novel contains an exposition of Objectivism in a lengthy monologue delivered by Galt.

Despite many negative reviews, Atlas Shrugged became an international bestseller. However, the reaction of intellectuals to the novel discouraged and depressed Rand. Atlas Shrugged was her last completed work of fiction, marking the end of her career as a novelist and the beginning of her role as a popular philosopher.

In 1958, Nathaniel Branden established the Nathaniel Branden Lectures, later incorporated as the Nathaniel Branden Institute (NBI), to promote Rand's philosophy through public lectures. In 1962, he and Rand co-founded The Objectivist Newsletter (later renamed The Objectivist) to circulate articles about her ideas. She later republished some of these articles in book form. Rand was unimpressed by many of the NBI students and held them to strict standards, sometimes reacting coldly or angrily to those who disagreed with her.

Critics, including some former NBI students and Branden himself, later said the NBI culture was one of intellectual conformity and excessive reverence for Rand. Some described the NBI or the Objectivist movement as a cult or religion. Rand expressed opinions on a wide range of topics, from literature and music to sexuality and facial hair. Some of her followers mimicked her preferences, wearing clothes to match characters from her novels and buying furniture like hers. Some former NBI students believed the extent of these behaviors was exaggerated, and the problem was concentrated among Rand's closest followers in New York.

=== Later years ===
In the 1960s and 1970s, Rand developed and promoted her Objectivist philosophy through nonfiction, media appearances, and speeches, including annual lectures at the Ford Hall Forum. In answers to audience questions, she took controversial stances on political and social issues. These included supporting abortion rights, opposing the Vietnam War and the military draft (but condemning many draft dodgers as "bums"), supporting Israel in the Yom Kippur War of 1973 against a coalition of Arab nations as "civilized men fighting savages", claiming European colonists had the right to invade and take land inhabited by American Indians, and calling homosexuality "immoral" and "disgusting", despite advocating the repeal of all laws concerning it. She endorsed several Republican candidates for president of the United States, most strongly Barry Goldwater in 1964.

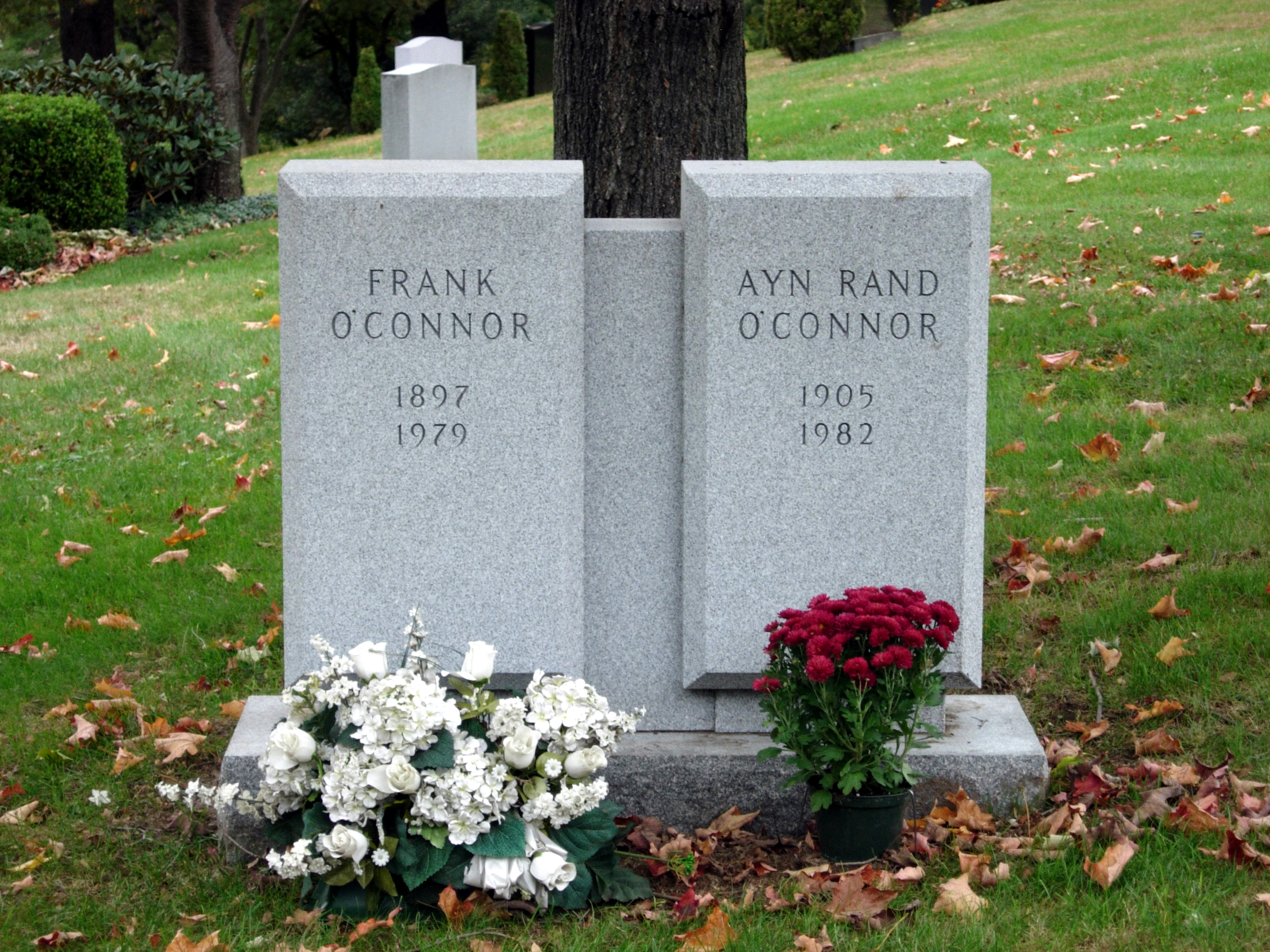
Grave marker for Rand and her husband at Kensico Cemetery in Valhalla, New York

In 1964, Nathaniel Branden began an affair with the young actress Patrecia Scott, whom he later married. Nathaniel and Barbara Branden kept the affair hidden from Rand. As her relationship with Nathaniel Branden deteriorated, Rand had her husband be present for difficult conversations between her and Branden. In 1968, Rand learned about Branden's relationship with Scott. Though her romantic involvement with Nathaniel Branden was already over, Rand ended her relationship with both Brandens, and the NBI closed. She published an article in The Objectivist repudiating Nathaniel Branden for dishonesty and "irrational behavior in his private life". In subsequent years, Rand and several more of her closest associates parted company.

In 1973, Rand learned that her youngest sister, Nora, was still alive in Leningrad. Rand arranged for Nora and her husband to visit New York in April 1974, but the sisters clashed repeatedly over their differing beliefs. After the couple returned to the Soviet Union in May, Rand never spoke to them again.

In December 1974, Rand was diagnosed with lung cancer after decades of heavy smoking; it was successfully treated with surgery in January 1975. In 1976, she retired from her newsletter and, despite her objections to government-run social programs, claimed Social Security and Medicare with the aid of a representative from her lawyers. Her activities in the Objectivist movement declined, especially after her husband died on November 9, 1979. One of her final projects was a never-completed television adaptation of Atlas Shrugged.

On March 6, 1982, Rand died of heart failure at her home in New York City. Her funeral included a 6-foot (1.8 m) floral arrangement in the shape of a dollar sign. In her will, Rand named Peikoff as her heir.

== Literary approach, influences and reception ==
Rand described her approach to literature as "romantic realism". She wanted her fiction to present the world "as it could be and should be", rather than as it was. This approach led her to create highly stylized situations and characters. Her fiction typically has protagonists who are heroic individualists, depicted as fit and attractive. Her villains support duty and collectivist moral ideals. Rand often describes them as unattractive, and some have names that suggest negative traits, such as Wesley Mouch in Atlas Shrugged.

Rand considered plot a critical element of literature, and her stories typically have what biographer Anne Heller described as "tight, elaborate, fast-paced plotting". Romantic triangles are a common plot element in Rand's fiction; in most of her novels and plays, the main female character is romantically involved with at least two men.

=== Influences ===
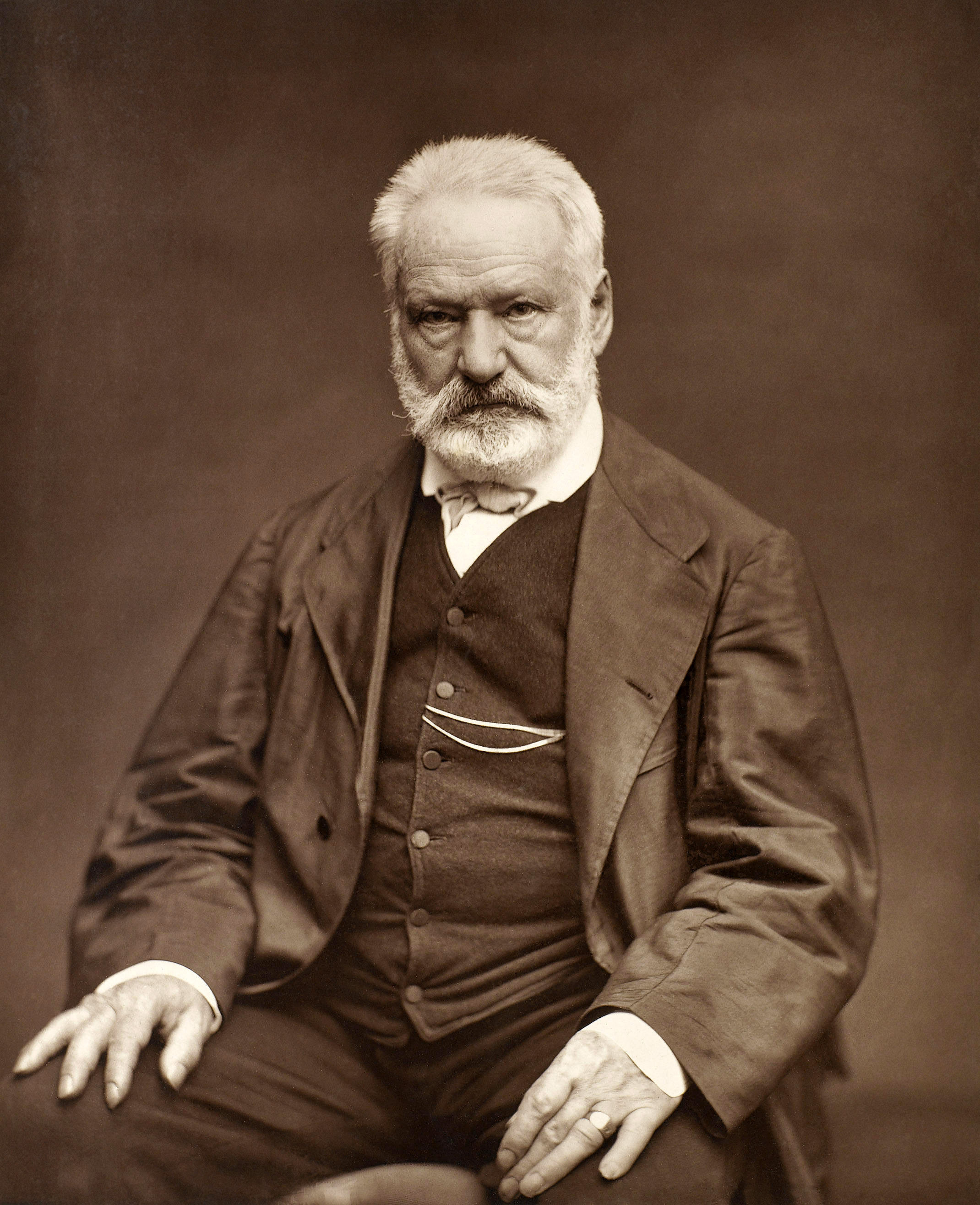
Rand admired the novels of Victor Hugo.

In school, Rand read works by Fyodor Dostoevsky, Victor Hugo, Edmond Rostand, and Friedrich Schiller, who became her favorites. She considered them to be among the "top rank" of Romantic writers because of their focus on moral themes and their skill at constructing plots. Hugo was an important influence on her writing, especially her approach to plotting. In the introduction she wrote for an English-language edition of his novel Ninety-Three, Rand called him "the greatest novelist in world literature".

Although Rand disliked most Russian literature, her depictions of her heroes show the influence of the Russian Symbolists and other nineteenth-century Russian writing, most notably the 1863 novel What Is to Be Done? by Nikolay Chernyshevsky. Scholars of Russian literature see in Chernyshevsky's character Rakhmetov, an "ascetic revolutionist", the template for Rand's literary heroes and heroines.

Rand's experience of the Russian Revolution and early Communist Russia influenced the portrayal of her villains. Beyond We the Living, which is set in Russia, this influence can be seen in the ideas and rhetoric of Ellsworth Toohey in The Fountainhead, and in the destruction of the economy in Atlas Shrugged.

Rand's descriptive style echoes her early career writing scenarios and scripts for movies; her novels have many narrative descriptions that resemble early Hollywood movie scenarios. They often follow common film editing conventions, such as having a broad establishing shot description of a scene followed by close-up details, and her descriptions of women characters often take a "male gaze" perspective.

=== Contemporaneous reviews ===
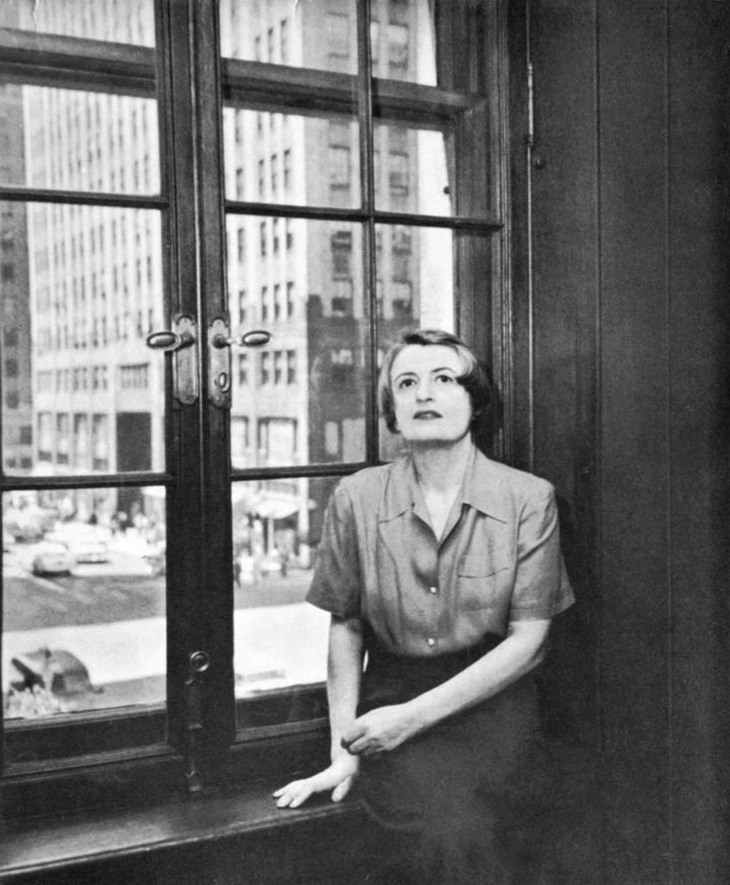
Rand in 1957

The first reviews Rand received were for Night of January 16th. Reviews of the Broadway production were largely positive, but Rand considered even positive reviews to be embarrassing because of significant changes made to her script by the producer. Although Rand believed that We the Living was not widely reviewed, over 200 publications published approximately 125 different reviews. Overall, they were more positive than those she received for her later work. Anthem received little review attention, both for its first publication in England and for subsequent re-issues.

Rand's first bestseller, The Fountainhead, received far fewer reviews than We the Living, and reviewers' opinions were mixed. Lorine Pruette's positive review in The New York Times, which called the author "a writer of great power" who wrote "brilliantly, beautifully and bitterly", was one that Rand greatly appreciated. There were other positive reviews, but Rand dismissed most of them for either misunderstanding her message or for being in unimportant publications. Some negative reviews said the novel was too long; others called the characters unsympathetic and Rand's style "offensively pedestrian".

Atlas Shrugged was widely reviewed, and many of the reviews were strongly negative. Atlas Shrugged received positive reviews from a few publications; however, Rand scholar Mimi Reisel Gladstein later wrote that "reviewers seemed to vie with each other in a contest to devise the cleverest put-downs", with reviews including comments that it was "written out of hate" and showed "remorseless hectoring and prolixity". Whittaker Chambers wrote what was later called the novel's most "notorious" review for the conservative magazine National Review. He accused Rand of supporting a godless system (which he related to that of the Soviets), claiming, "From almost any page of Atlas Shrugged, a voice can be heard ... commanding: 'To a gas chamber—go!'". (Note: Although she was previously friendly with National Review editor William F. Buckley Jr., Rand cut off all contact with him after the review was published. Historian Jennifer Burns describes the review as a break between Buckley's religious conservatism and non-religious libertarianism.)

Rand's nonfiction received far fewer reviews than her novels. The tenor of the criticism for her first nonfiction book, For the New Intellectual, was similar to that for Atlas Shrugged. Philosopher Sidney Hook likened her certainty to "the way philosophy is written in the Soviet Union", and author Gore Vidal called her viewpoint "nearly perfect in its immorality". These reviews set the pattern for reaction to her ideas among liberal critics. Her subsequent books got progressively less review attention.

=== Academic assessments of Rand's fiction ===
Academic consideration of Rand as a literary figure during her life was limited. Mimi Reisel Gladstein could not find any scholarly articles about Rand's novels when she began researching her in 1973, and only three such articles appeared during the rest of the 1970s. Since her death, scholars of English and American literature have continued largely to ignore her work, although attention to her literary work has increased since the 1990s. Several academic book series about important authors cover Rand and her works, (Note: These include Twayne's United States Authors (Ayn Rand by James T. Baker), Twayne's Masterwork Studies (The Fountainhead: An American Novel by Den Uyl and Atlas Shrugged: Manifesto of the Mind by Gladstein), and Re-reading the Canon (Feminist Interpretations of Ayn Rand, edited by Gladstein and Sciabarra).) as do popular study guides like CliffsNotes and SparkNotes. In The Literary Encyclopedia entry for Rand written in 2001, John David Lewis declared that "Rand wrote the most intellectually challenging fiction of her generation." In 2019, Lisa Duggan described Rand's fiction as popular and influential on many readers, despite being easy to criticize for "her cartoonish characters and melodramatic plots, her rigid moralizing, her middle- to lowbrow aesthetic preferences ... and philosophical strivings".

== Philosophy ==
Rand called her philosophy "Objectivism", describing its essence as "the concept of man as a heroic being, with his own happiness as the moral purpose of his life, with productive achievement as his noblest activity, and reason as his only absolute". She considered Objectivism a systematic philosophy and laid out positions on metaphysics, epistemology, ethics, aesthetics, and political philosophy.

=== Metaphysics and epistemology ===
In metaphysics, Rand supported philosophical realism and opposed anything she regarded as mysticism or supernaturalism, including all forms of religion. Rand believed in free will as a form of agent causation and rejected determinism.

Rand also related her aesthetics to metaphysics by defining art as a "selective re-creation of reality according to an artist's metaphysical value-judgments". According to her, art allows philosophical concepts to be presented in a concrete form that can be grasped easily, thereby fulfilling a need of human consciousness. As a writer, the art form Rand focused on most closely was literature. In works such as The Romantic Manifesto and The Art of Fiction, she described Romanticism as the approach that most accurately reflects the existence of human free will.

In epistemology, Rand considered all knowledge to be based on forming higher levels of understanding from sense perception, the validity of which she considered axiomatic. She described reason as "the faculty that identifies and integrates the material provided by man's senses". Rand rejected all claims of non-perceptual knowledge, including "'instinct,' 'intuition,' 'revelation,' or any form of 'just knowing'". In her Introduction to Objectivist Epistemology, Rand presented a theory of concept formation and rejected the analytic–synthetic dichotomy. She believed epistemology was a foundational branch of philosophy and considered the advocacy of reason to be the single most significant aspect of her philosophy.

Commentators, including Hazel Barnes, Nathaniel Branden, and Albert Ellis, have criticized Rand's focus on the importance of reason. Barnes and Ellis said Rand was too dismissive of emotion and failed to recognize its importance in human life. Branden said Rand's emphasis on reason led her to denigrate emotions and create unrealistic expectations of how consistently rational human beings should be.

=== Ethics and politics ===
In ethics, Rand argued for rational and ethical egoism (rational self-interest), as the guiding moral principle. She said the individual should "exist for his own sake, neither sacrificing himself to others nor sacrificing others to himself". Rand referred to egoism as "the virtue of selfishness" in her book of that title. In it, she presented her solution to the is–ought problem by describing a meta-ethical theory that based morality in the needs of "man's survival qua man", which requires the use of a rational mind. She condemned ethical altruism as incompatible with the requirements of human life and happiness, and held the initiation of force was evil and irrational, writing in Atlas Shrugged that "Force and mind are opposites".

Rand's ethics and politics are the most criticized areas of her philosophy. Several authors, including Robert Nozick and William F. O'Neill in two of the earliest academic critiques of her ideas, said she failed in her attempt to solve the is–ought problem. Critics have called her definitions of egoism and altruism biased and inconsistent with normal usage. Critics from religious traditions oppose her atheism and her rejection of altruism.

Rand's political philosophy emphasized individual rights, including property rights. She considered laissez-faire capitalism the only moral social system because in her view it was the only system based on protecting those rights. Rand opposed collectivism and statism, which she considered to include many specific forms of government, such as communism, fascism, socialism, theocracy, and the welfare state. Her preferred form of government was a constitutional republic that is limited to the protection of individual rights. Although her political views are often classified as conservative or libertarian, Rand preferred the term "radical for capitalism". She worked with conservatives on political projects but disagreed with them over issues such as religion and ethics. Rand rejected anarchism as a naive theory based in subjectivism that would lead to collectivism in practice, and denounced libertarianism, which she associated with anarchism.

Several critics, including Nozick, have said her attempt to justify individual rights based on egoism fails. Others, like libertarian philosopher Michael Huemer, have gone further, saying that her support of egoism and her support of individual rights are inconsistent positions. Some critics, like Roy Childs, have said that her opposition to the initiation of force should lead to support of anarchism, rather than limited government.

=== Relationship to other philosophers ===
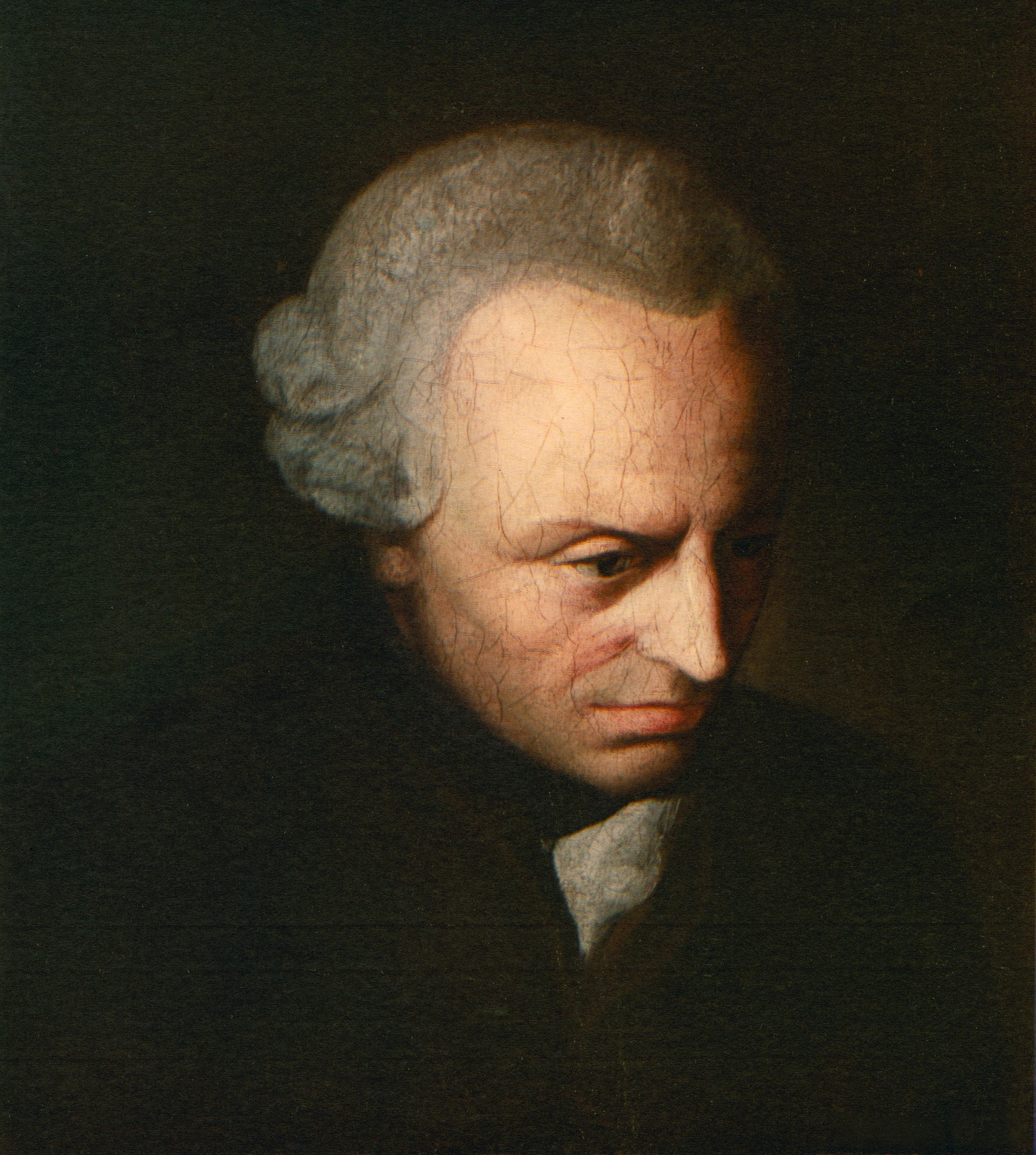
Rand claimed Aristotle (left) as her primary philosophical influence, and strongly criticized Immanuel Kant (right).

Except for Aristotle, Thomas Aquinas and classical liberals, Rand was sharply critical of most philosophers and philosophical traditions known to her. Acknowledging Aristotle as her greatest influence, Rand remarked that in the history of philosophy she could only recommend "three A's"—Aristotle, Aquinas, and Ayn Rand. In a 1959 interview with Mike Wallace, when asked where her philosophy came from, she responded: "Out of my own mind, with the sole acknowledgement of a debt to Aristotle, the only philosopher who ever influenced me."

In an article for the Claremont Review of Books, political scientist Charles Murray criticized Rand's claim that her only "philosophical debt" was to Aristotle. He asserted her ideas were derivative of previous thinkers such as John Locke and Friedrich Nietzsche. Rand took early inspiration from Nietzsche, and scholars have found indications of this in Rand's private journals. In 1928, she alluded to his idea of the "superman" in notes for an unwritten novel whose protagonist was inspired by the murderer William Edward Hickman, whom Rand observed early in the trial before his guilt was decided by jury. There are other indications of Nietzsche's influence in passages from the first edition of We the Living, which Rand later revised, and in her overall writing style.

By the time Rand wrote The Fountainhead, she had turned against Nietzsche's ideas, and the extent of his influence on her even during her early years is disputed. She said in a 1964 radio interview that she was "very anxious to separate Objectivism from Nietzsche altogether. …I don't want to be confused with Nietzsche in any respect."

Rand's views may have been influenced by the promotion of egoism among the Russian nihilists, including Chernyshevsky and Dmitry Pisarev, although there is no direct evidence that she read them.

Rand considered Immanuel Kant her philosophical opposite and "the most evil man in mankind's history". She believed his epistemology undermined reason and his ethics opposed self-interest. Philosophers George Walsh and Fred Seddon have argued she misinterpreted Kant and exaggerated their differences. She was critical of Plato and viewed his differences with Aristotle on questions of metaphysics and epistemology as the primary conflict in the history of philosophy.

Rand's relationship with contemporary philosophers was mostly antagonistic. She was not an academic and did not participate in academic discourse. She was dismissive of critics and wrote about ideas she disagreed with in a polemical manner without in-depth analysis. Academic philosophers viewed her negatively and dismissed her as an unimportant figure who should not be considered a philosopher, or given any serious response.

=== Early academic reaction ===
During Rand's lifetime, her work received little attention from academic scholars. In 1967, John Hospers discussed Rand's ethical ideas in the second edition of his textbook, An Introduction to Philosophical Analysis. In 1967, Hazel Barnes included a chapter critiquing Objectivism in her book An Existentialist Ethics. When the first full-length academic book about Rand's philosophy appeared in 1971, its author declared writing about Rand "a treacherous undertaking" that could lead to "guilt by association" for taking her seriously.

A few articles about Rand's ideas appeared in academic journals before her death in 1982, many of them in The Personalist. One of these was "On the Randian Argument" by libertarian philosopher Robert Nozick, who criticized her meta-ethical arguments. In the same journal, other philosophers argued that Nozick misstated Rand's case. In a 1978 article responding to Nozick, Douglas Den Uyl and Douglas B. Rasmussen defended her positions, but described her style as "literary, hyperbolic and emotional".

After her death, interest in Rand's ideas increased gradually. The Philosophic Thought of Ayn Rand, a 1984 collection of essays about Objectivism edited by Den Uyl and Rasmussen, was the first academic book about Rand's ideas published after her death. In one essay, political writer Jack Wheeler wrote that despite "the incessant bombast and continuous venting of Randian rage", Rand's ethics are "a most immense achievement, the study of which is vastly more fruitful than any other in contemporary thought". In 1987, the Ayn Rand Society was founded as an affiliate of the American Philosophical Association.

In a 1995 entry about Rand in Contemporary Women Philosophers, Jenny A. Heyl described a divergence in how different academic specialties viewed Rand. She said that Rand's philosophy "is regularly omitted from academic philosophy. Yet, throughout literary academia, Ayn Rand is considered a philosopher." Writing in the 1998 edition of the Routledge Encyclopedia of Philosophy, political theorist Chandran Kukathas summarized the mainstream philosophical reception of her work in two parts. He said most commentators view her ethical argument as an unconvincing variant of Aristotle's ethics, and her political theory "is of little interest" because it is marred by an "ill-thought out and unsystematic" effort to reconcile her hostility to the state with her rejection of anarchism. In 1999, The Journal of Ayn Rand Studies, a peer-reviewed, multidisciplinary academic journal devoted to the study of Rand and her ideas, was established.

=== 21st-century academic reaction ===
In 2009, historian Jennifer Burns identified "an explosion of scholarship" about Rand since 2000; however, as of that year, few universities included Rand or Objectivism as a philosophical specialty or research area. From 2002 to 2012, over 60 colleges and universities accepted grants from the charitable foundation of BB&T that required teaching Rand's ideas or works. In some cases, the grants were controversial or even rejected because of the requirement to teach about Rand.

In a 2010 essay for the Cato Institute, Huemer argued very few people find Rand's ideas convincing, especially her ethics. He attributed the attention she receives to her being a "compelling writer", especially as a novelist. In 2012, the Pennsylvania State University Press agreed to take over publication of The Journal of Ayn Rand Studies, and the University of Pittsburgh Press launched an "Ayn Rand Society Philosophical Studies" series based on the Society's proceedings. The Fall 2012 update to the entry about Rand in the Stanford Encyclopedia of Philosophy said that "only a few professional philosophers have taken her work seriously".

In 2012, political scientist Alan Wolfe dismissed Rand as a "nonperson" among academics, an attitude that writer Ben Murnane later described as "the traditional academic view" of Rand. In a 2018 article for Aeon, philosopher Skye C. Cleary wrote: "Philosophers love to hate Ayn Rand. It's trendy to scoff at any mention of her." However, Cleary said that because many people take Rand's ideas seriously, philosophers "need to treat the Ayn Rand phenomenon seriously" and provide refutations rather than ignoring her.

In 2020, media critic Eric Burns said that "Rand is surely the most engaging philosopher of my lifetime", but "nobody in the academe pays any attention to her, neither as an author nor a philosopher". In 2020, the editor of a collection of critical essays about Rand said academics who disapproved of her ideas had long held "a stubborn resolve to ignore or ridicule" her work but that more were engaging with her work in recent years. In 2023, The Journal of Ayn Rand Studies ceased publication.

== Legacy ==
=== Popular interest ===
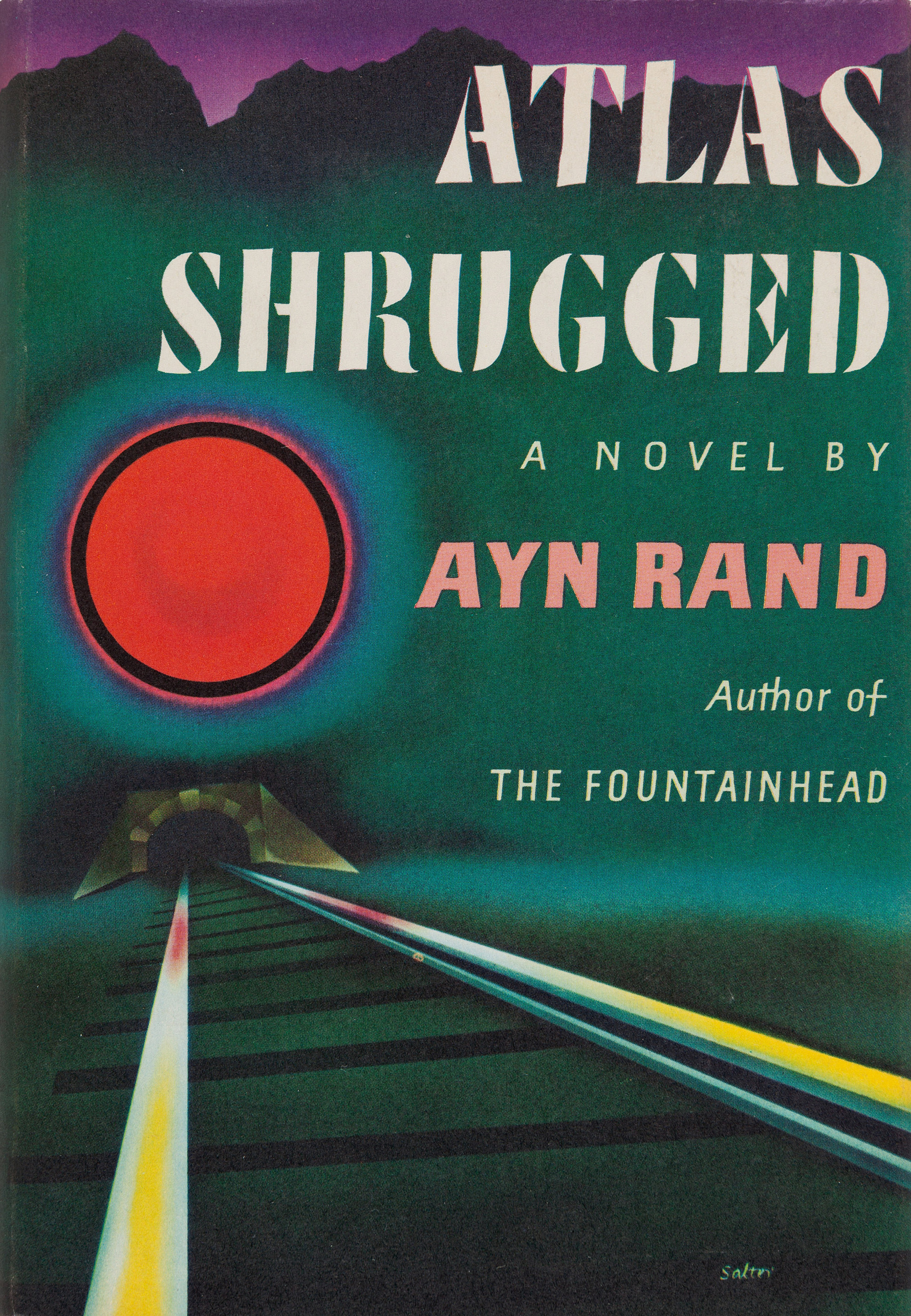
Atlas Shrugged has sold more than 10 million copies.

With over 37 million copies sold as of 2020, Rand's books continue to be read widely. In 1991, a survey conducted for the Library of Congress and the Book of the Month Club asked club members to name the most influential book in their lives. Rand's Atlas Shrugged was the second most popular choice, after the Bible. Although Rand's influence has been greatest in the United States, there has been international interest in her work. (Note: Countries mentioned by sources discussing such interest include Australia, Denmark, France, Germany, Iceland, India, Israel, Monaco, the Netherlands, Spain, Sweden, Switzerland, and the United Kingdom.)

Rand's contemporary admirers included fellow novelists, like Ira Levin, Kay Nolte Smith and L. Neil Smith. She influenced later writers like Erika Holzer, Terry Goodkind, and comic book artist Steve Ditko. Rand provided a positive view of business; subsequently, many business executives and entrepreneurs have admired and promoted her work. Businessmen such as John Allison of BB&T and Ed Snider of Comcast Spectacor have funded the promotion of Rand's ideas.

Television shows, movies, songs, and video games have referred to Rand and her works. Throughout her life she was the subject of many articles in popular magazines, as well as book-length critiques by authors such as the psychologist Albert Ellis and Trinity Foundation president John W. Robbins. Rand or characters based on her figure prominently in novels by American authors, including Kay Nolte Smith, Mary Gaitskill, Matt Ruff, and Tobias Wolff. Nick Gillespie, former editor-in-chief of Reason, remarked: "Rand's is a tortured immortality, one in which she's as likely to be a punch line as a protagonist. Jibes at Rand as cold and inhuman run through the popular culture."

Two movies have been made about Rand's life. A 1997 documentary film, Ayn Rand: A Sense of Life, was nominated for the Academy Award for Best Documentary Feature. The Passion of Ayn Rand, a 1999 television adaptation of the book of the same name, won several awards. Rand's image appears on a 1999 U.S. postage stamp illustrated by artist Nick Gaetano.

Rand's works, most commonly Anthem or The Fountainhead, are sometimes assigned as secondary school reading. Since 2002, the Ayn Rand Institute has provided free copies of Rand's novels to teachers who promise to include the books in their curriculum. The Institute had distributed 4.5 million copies in the U.S. and Canada by the end of 2020. In 2017, Rand was added to the required reading list for the A Level Politics exam in the United Kingdom.

=== Political influence ===
Although she rejected the labels "conservative" and "libertarian", Rand has had a continuing influence on right-wing politics and libertarianism. Rand is often considered one of the three most important women, along with Rose Wilder Lane and Isabel Paterson, in the early development of modern American libertarianism. David Nolan, one founder of the Libertarian Party, said that "without Ayn Rand, the libertarian movement would not exist". In his history of libertarianism, journalist Brian Doherty described her as "the most influential libertarian of the twentieth century to the public at large". Political scientist Andrew Koppelman called her "the most widely read libertarian". Historian Jennifer Burns referred to her as "the ultimate gateway drug to life on the right". In 1971, It Usually Begins With Ayn Rand was the title of a satirical memoir by American libertarian political activist Jerome Tuccille.

The political figures who cite Rand as an influence are usually conservatives, often members of the Republican Party, despite Rand taking some atypical positions for a conservative, like supporting abortion rights and being an atheist. She faced intense opposition from William F. Buckley Jr. and other contributors to the conservative National Review magazine, which published numerous criticisms of her writings and ideas. Nevertheless, a 1987 article in The New York Times called her the Reagan administration's "novelist laureate". Republican congressmen and conservative pundits have acknowledged her influence on their lives and have recommended her novels. She has influenced some conservative politicians outside the U.S., such as Sajid Javid in the United Kingdom, Siv Jensen in Norway, and Ayelet Shaked in Israel.

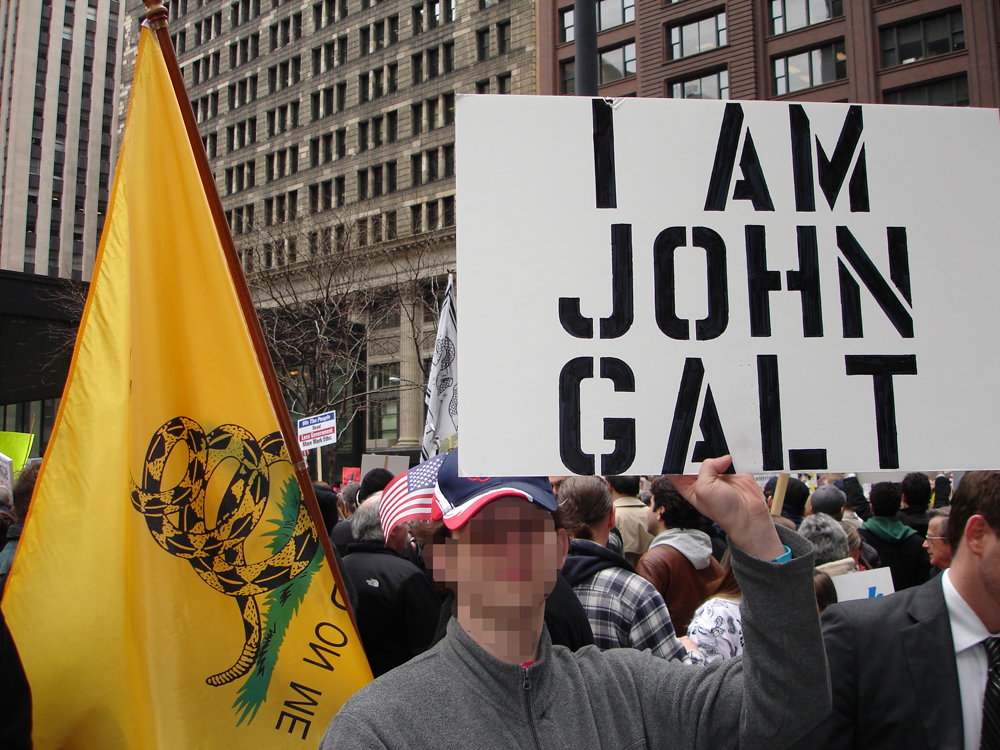
A protester's sign at a 2009 Tea Party rally refers to John Galt, the hero of Rand's Atlas Shrugged.

The 2008 financial crisis renewed interest in her works, especially Atlas Shrugged, which some saw as foreshadowing the crisis. Opinion articles compared real-world events with the novel's plot. Signs mentioning Rand and her fictional hero John Galt appeared at Tea Party protests. There was increased criticism of her ideas, especially from the political left. Critics blamed the Great Recession on her support of selfishness and free markets, particularly through her influence on Alan Greenspan.

In 2015, Adam Weiner said that through Greenspan, "Rand had effectively chucked a ticking time bomb into the boiler room of the US economy". In 2019, Lisa Duggan said that Rand's novels had "incalculable impact" in encouraging the spread of neoliberal political ideas. In 2021, Cass Sunstein said Rand's ideas could be seen in the tax and regulatory policies of the Trump administration, which he attributed to the "enduring influence" of Rand's fiction.

=== Objectivist movement ===
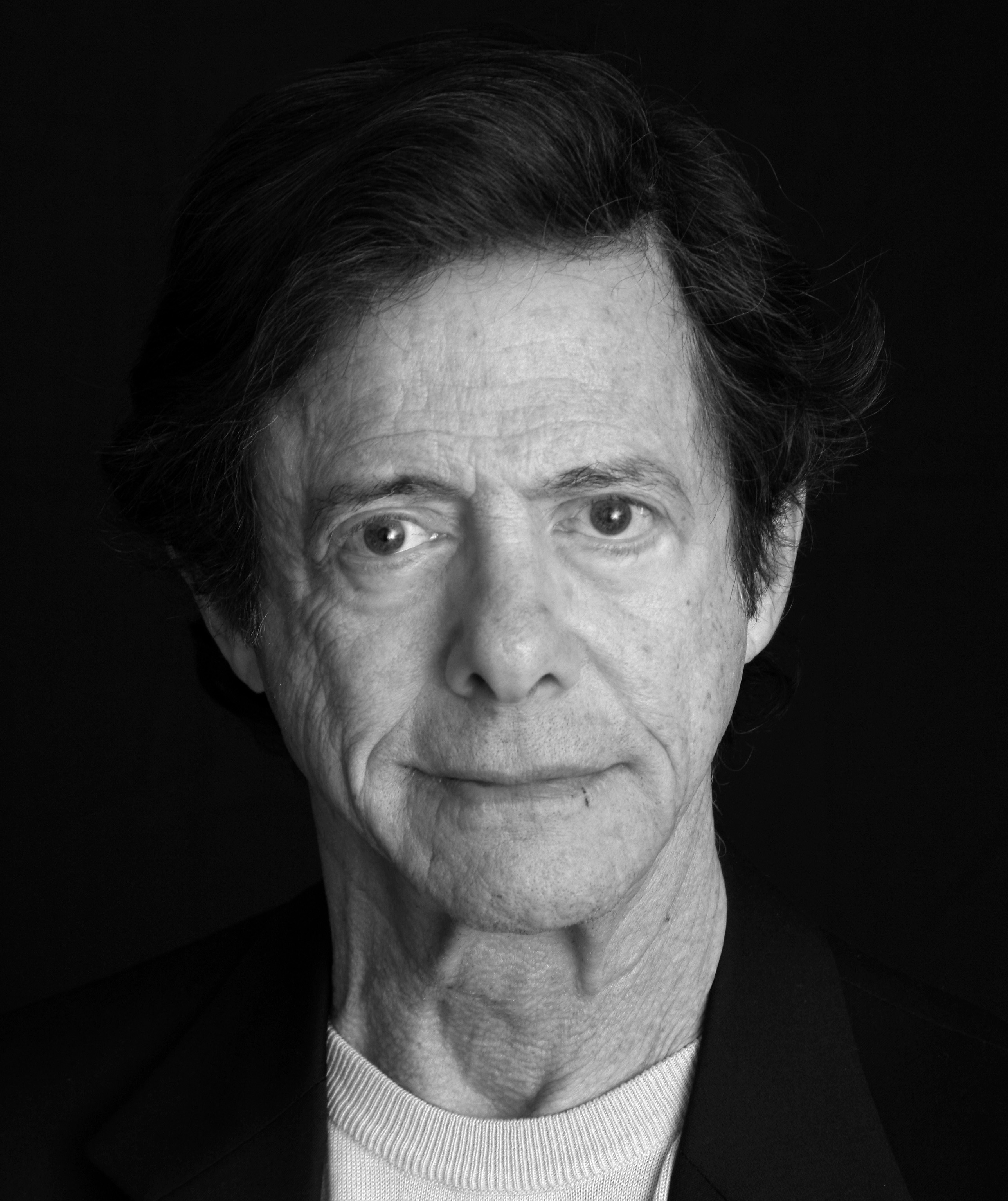
Rand's heir Leonard Peikoff co-founded the Ayn Rand Institute.

After the closure of the Nathaniel Branden Institute, the Objectivist movement continued in other forms. In the 1970s, Peikoff began delivering courses on Objectivism. In 1979, Peter Schwartz started a newsletter called The Intellectual Activist, which Rand endorsed. She also endorsed The Objectivist Forum, a bimonthly magazine founded by Objectivist philosopher Harry Binswanger, which ran from 1980 to 1987.

In 1985, Peikoff worked with businessman Ed Snider to establish the Ayn Rand Institute, a nonprofit organization dedicated to promoting Rand's ideas and works. In 1990, after an ideological disagreement with Peikoff, David Kelley founded the Institute for Objectivist Studies, now known as The Atlas Society. In 2001, historian John P. McCaskey organized the Anthem Foundation for Objectivist Scholarship, which provides grants for scholarly work on Objectivism in academia.

== Selected works ==
Fiction and drama

- Red Pawn
- Night of January 16th (performed 1934, published 1968)
- We the Living (1936, revised 1959)
- Anthem (1938, revised 1946)
- The Unconquered (performed 1940, published 2014)
- The Fountainhead (1943)
- Atlas Shrugged (1957)
- The Early Ayn Rand (1984)
  - Ideal (1936, performed 1989)
  - Think Twice (1939)
- Ideal (based on the eponymous play, 2015)

Non-fiction

- Pola Negri (1925)
- For the New Intellectual (1961)
- The Virtue of Selfishness (1964)
- Capitalism: The Unknown Ideal (1966, expanded 1967)
- The Romantic Manifesto (1969, expanded 1975)
- The New Left (1971, expanded 1975)
- Introduction to Objectivist Epistemology (1979, expanded 1990)
- Philosophy: Who Needs It (1982)
- Letters of Ayn Rand (1995, expanded 2025)
- Journals of Ayn Rand (1997)
