= Erika Holzer =

American novelist and essayist (died 2019)

- Born: Phyllis Tate; 1935 Mechanicville
- Died: 2019 (aged 83–84)
- Occupation: Lawyer, novelist

Erika Holzer was an American novelist and essayist who was a close associate of Ayn Rand. Her novel Eye for an Eye was the basis for a major motion picture of the same name. She also co-authored two nonfiction books with her husband, professor of law Henry Mark "Hank" Holzer.

== Career ==
Erika Holzer was born Phyllis Tate, one of four children of attorney Frank Tate and his wife, also named Phyllis. She grew up in Mechanicville, New York, before attending Cornell University for her undergraduate degree. She received a juris doctor degree from New York University. While in law school, she met and married Henry Mark Holzer. After law school she worked for Battle, Fowler, Stokes & Kheel, a labor law firm, before opening her own law practice with her husband. She later legally changed her first name to 'Erika'.

Erika and her husband were students of Rand's philosophy of Objectivism in New York City during the 1960s. In 1966 Erika and Rand, who was a best-selling novelist, began what would become a series of discussions about the art of writing. Henry Mark Holzer became Rand's personal attorney.

In the late 1960s, the Holzers managed to track down an original negative, thought to have been destroyed, of a 1942 Italian two-part film which had been adapted from Rand's first novel We the Living. Erika Holzer helped Duncan Scott restore the film, edit it under Rand's guidance, and write English subtitles for the 1986 re-release of the film.

Encouraged by Rand, Holzer embarked upon a new career as a writer; her first novel, Double Crossing, received critical acclaim and was a finalist for the 1984 Prometheus Award for Best Novel. The plot revolves around the conflict between two brothers born in the Soviet Union, one becoming a powerful official in the Soviet police and the other secretly planning his escape from the Communist regime.

Her second novel, Eye for an Eye, published in 1993, is about a mother who joins a vigilante group after the criminal justice system releases the murderer of her daughter. In 1996, Paramount Pictures released a film adaptation (also titled Eye for an Eye), directed by John Schlesinger and starring Sally Field and Kiefer Sutherland. Holzer was not involved with the production.

She gave interviews and wrote many essays for Objectivist, libertarian, and conservative websites.

== Human rights ==
As lawyers, the Holzers were involved in several pro bono cases, most notably the struggle of the 12-year-old defector Walter Polovchak to avoid being forcibly returned to the Soviet Union. Another case resulted in political asylum being granted to two defectors from a Romanian circus.

== Published works ==
=== Articles ===
- Holzer, Erika (December 1968). "Preserve and Protect by Allen Drury". The Objectivist. 7 (12). Book review.
- Holzer, Erika; Rand, Ayn (December 1969). "The War of Liberation in Hollywood". The Objectivist. 8 (6). Anti-intellectualism in Hollywood, illustrated by the movies Bullitt, Charly, and 2001: A Space Odyssey.

=== Novels ===
- Holzer, Erika (2001) [1983]. Double Crossing. Putnam. ISBN 0-595-17696-8. A Soviet doctor tries to escape to the West by exchanging identities with an American.
- Holzer, Erika (2001) [1993]. Eye for an Eye. St. Martin's Press. ISBN 0-595-19260-2. A woman turns to a vigilante group for justice after the legal system fails her.

=== Nonfiction books ===
- Holzer, Erika; Holzer, Henry Mark (2006) [2002]. "Aid and Comfort": Jane Fonda in North Vietnam (2nd ed.). McFarland. ISBN 0-7864-2729-9. Argues that Jane Fonda's activities in North Vietnam would support indictment and conviction for treason.
- Holzer, Erika; Holzer, Henry Mark (2003). Fake Warriors. Xlibris. ISBN 1-4010-9675-1. Subtitled "Identifying, Exposing, and Punishing Those Who Falsify Their Military Service", specifically concerning the Vietnam War.
- Holzer, Erika (2005). Ayn Rand: My Fiction-writing Teacher. Madison Press. ISBN 0-615-13041-0. Insight into Ayn Rand's ideas about fiction writing; includes Holzer's short stories and writing exercises.
