= The Virtue of Selfishness =

1964 book by Ayn Rand

- Cover of the 1964 Signet Books edition
- Author: Ayn Rand
- Language: English
- Subject: Ethics
- Publisher: New American Library
- Publication date: 1964
- Publication place: United States
- Media type: Print
- Pages: 173 (Centennial edition)
- ISBN: 0-451-16393-1 (Centennial edition)
- OCLC: 183461

The Virtue of Selfishness: A New Concept of Egoism is a 1964 collection of essays by the Russian-born American philosopher Ayn Rand and the Canadian-American writer Nathaniel Branden. Most of the essays originally appeared in The Objectivist Newsletter. The book covers ethical issues from the perspective of Rand's Objectivist philosophy. Some of its themes include the identification and validation of egoism as a rational code of ethics, the destructiveness of altruism, and the nature of a proper government.

== Summary ==
The book contains 19 essays, 14 of them written by Rand and five by Branden, plus an introduction written by Rand. All but one of the essays had previously been published in The Objectivist Newsletter, a magazine that Rand and Branden had launched in 1962. The exception was the book's first essay, "The Objectivist Ethics", which was a paper Rand delivered at the University of Wisconsin during a symposium on "Ethics in Our Time". "The Objectivist Ethics" explains the foundations of Rand's ethical theory. Her other essays engage a variety of ethical topics, often challenging common perspectives on such issues as compromise and moral judgment. Branden's essays, such as "Counterfeit Individualism" and "The Psychology of Pleasure", present a more psychologically focused view of morality.

Rand defines morality as "a code of values to guide man's choices and actions—the choices and actions that determine the purpose and the course of his life."

The foundation of Rand’s ethics rests on her analysis of the concept of value, which she holds to be the central concept of morality and defines as “that which one acts to gain and/or keep.” Rand argues that the existence of values presupposes a fundamental alternative, which she identifies as the alternative of life or death, as only life is an end in itself and only living organisms face the constant choice of self-sustaining action versus destruction. Rand holds that all values, therefore, are ultimately directed toward the maintenance of life. From this, Rand concludes that ethics is an objective science, with the requirements of an organism’s survival serving as the standard of moral judgment.

Holding that human beings survive by means of reason, Rand derives the principle of rational egoism, in which virtues such as independence, productivity, integrity, and pride serve the requirements of human survival and happiness.

Rand rejects altruism, which she defines as the moral doctrine that holds self-sacrifice as a virtue and regards the service of others as the moral ideal. In contrast, she holds that rational egoism is consistent with human coexistence, since trade and voluntary exchange are mutually beneficial. Rand holds that the political corollary of her ethics is the recognition of individual rights and a system of laissez-faire capitalism, which she regards as the only moral social system because it leaves individuals free to act on their rational judgment.

== Use of selfishness ==
Rand's characterization of selfishness as a virtue, including in the title of the book, is one of its most controversial elements. Philosopher Chandran Kukathas said Rand's position on this point "brought notoriety, but kept her out of the intellectual mainstream". Rand acknowledged in the book's introduction that the term "selfishness" was not typically used to describe virtuous behavior but insisted that her usage was consistent with a more precise meaning of the term as simply "concern with one's own interests". Rand said that the equation of selfishness with evil had caused "the arrested moral development of mankind" and needed to be rejected.

Critics have disputed Rand's interpretation of the term. Libertarian feminist writer Sharon Presley described Rand's use of selfishness as "perversely idiosyncratic" and contrary to the dictionary meaning of the term, Rand's claims to the contrary notwithstanding. Presley believed the use of the term caused Rand's arguments to be frequently mischaracterized. Philosophy professor Max Hocutt dismissed the phrase "the virtue of selfishness" as "rhetorical excess", saying that "without qualification and explanation, it is too paradoxical to merit serious discussion". In contrast, philosophers Douglas J. Den Uyl and Douglas B. Rasmussen described Rand's response to the question of why she uses the term as "neither antagonistic nor defensive, but rather profound". Philosopher Chris Matthew Sciabarra said it is "debatable" whether Rand accurately described the meaning of the term but argued that Rand's philosophical position required altering the conventional meanings of some terms in order to express her views without inventing entirely new words. Philosophy professor Stephen Hicks wrote in the Internet Encyclopedia of Philosophy that Rand's "provocative title" was matched by "an equally provocative thesis about ethics".

== Publication history ==
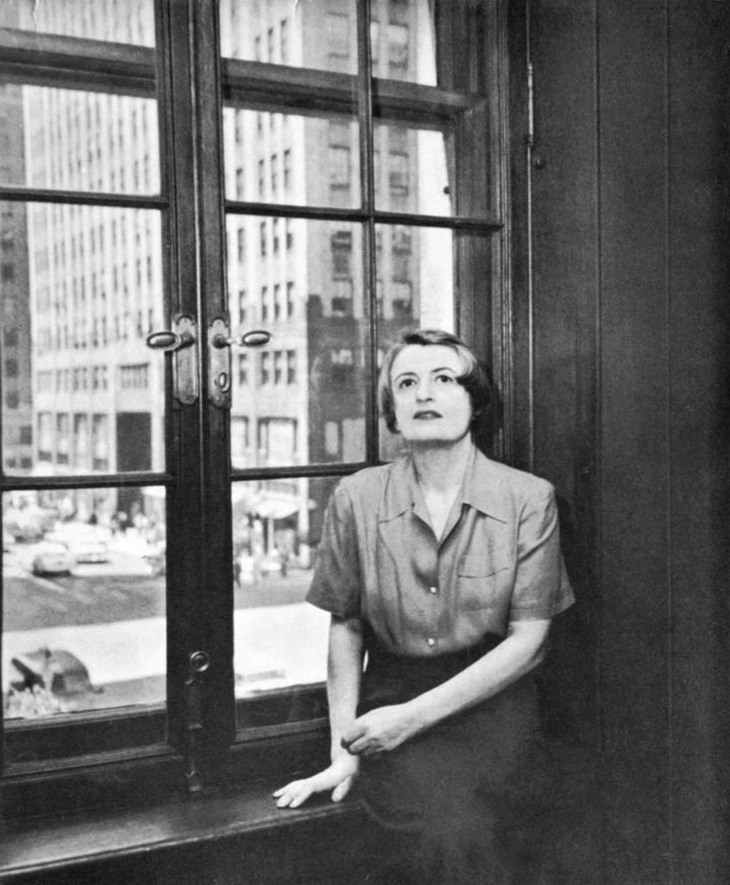
Rand in 1957

The idea of creating a collection of Rand's essays initially came from Bennett Cerf of Random House, who had published two of Rand's previous books, Atlas Shrugged and For the New Intellectual. Rand proposed a collection of articles to be titled The Fascist New Frontier, after a Ford Hall Forum speech she had given criticizing the views of President John F. Kennedy. Uncomfortable with Rand's comparison of Kennedy to Adolf Hitler, Cerf asked that Rand choose a different title essay. She rejected this request and dropped Random House, as well as ending her friendship with Cerf, choosing New American Library as the publisher for her new book. The Virtue of Selfishness bore a different title and did not include her piece on Kennedy; he had been assassinated before it was released, making the point of the essay moot.

== Reception ==
The book became one of Rand's strongest-selling works of nonfiction, selling over 400,000 copies in the first four months of its release, and over 1.35 million copies by 2014. Rand scholar Mimi Reisel Gladstein described the collection of essays as "eclectic" and "appealing to interested nonacademic or nonspecialist readers as well as to the more serious student of Objectivism". Gladstein reported that a number of contemporary reviews compared Rand's views to existentialism.

In his book Winning Through Intimidation, self-help author Robert J. Ringer said The Virtue of Selfishness is Rand's "masterpiece". In a public appearance, writer Christopher Hitchens said, "Though I have some respect for The Virtue of Selfishness, a collection of essays ... I don't think there's any need to have essays advocating selfishness among human beings. I don't know what your impression has been, but some things require no further reinforcement."
