= It Usually Begins with Ayn Rand =

Satirical memoir by Jerome Tuccille

It Usually Begins With Ayn Rand
- Cover of the first edition
- Author: Jerome Tuccille
- Language: English
- Subject: Libertarianism
- Publisher: Stein and Day
- Publication date: 1971
- Publication place: United States
- Media type: Print
- Pages: 192
- ISBN: 0-8128-1402-9

It Usually Begins With Ayn Rand is a satirical memoir by American libertarian political activist Jerome Tuccille. It was first published by Stein and Day in 1971. The title refers to novelist and philosopher Ayn Rand, whose work introduced Tuccille and other activists to libertarian ideas.

In a review of the literature about Rand, literary scholar Mimi Reisel Gladstein complimented Tuccille for his humor, especially in his satire of Rand's followers in the Objectivist movement. She also said that most of the book is not about Rand and instead focuses on other areas of right-wing politics. Roy Childs reviewed the book in Reason. Martin Morse Wooster did a retrospective on it in The American Enterprise.
