= Red Pawn =

Unproduced screenplay by Ayn Rand

- Red Pawn graphic novel cover
- Written by: Ayn Rand
- Production company: Universal Pictures
- Country: United States
- Language: English

Red Pawn is a screenplay written by Ayn Rand. It was the first screenplay that Rand sold. Universal Pictures purchased it in 1932. Red Pawn features the theme of the evil of dictatorship, specifically of Soviet Russia.

Red Pawn is a spy thriller set on Strastnoy Island in an undisclosed location in northern Soviet Russia during the 1920s. On the island is a converted monastery used as an institution for political prisoners. The screenplay follows Joan Harding, a.k.a. Frances Volkontzeva, an American woman who infiltrates Strastnoy Island to free her imprisoned husband, Michael Volkontzev.

Joan enters the prison under the pretext of being the new wife of the prison head Commandant Kareyev given to him by the state. A love triangle develops between the three characters as Joan works to free her husband while fooling the prison staff and Kareyev as to her true intentions.

The rights to the screenplay belong to Paramount Pictures, though the screenplay has never been adapted to film.

== Plot ==
Joan Harding arrives by boat at Strastnoy Island and is presented to Commandant Kareyev as his new, state-granted wife. Kareyev greets Joan coldly, believing that she will leave when the next boat comes six months later. Kareyev takes Joan on a tour around the prison island during which she observes the prisoners. Joan's husband, Michael Volkontzev, recognizes her and calls out to her, but she pretends not to recognize him. It is only later in her room that Joan (real name Frances Volkontzeva) reunites with Michael and tells him of her plan to free him. She will sneak him onto the next boat and help him escape the country through the help of an English merchant in the nearby town of Nijni Kolimsk. She asks that Michael trust her and keep his distance so Kareyev and others do not suspect that they know each other.

Months pass and Joan becomes friends with many of the political prisoners on the island, and slowly Commandant Kareyev begins to feel affection for her. Michael is torn over how his wife seems to return that affection and begins to doubt his wife's intentions. Joan arranges for Michael to sneak onto the next boat while the guard is given leave by Kareyev at her insistence, but she will not be joining Michael on the boat. He is to go alone while she stays with Kareyev. Joan tells Michael to meet up with the merchant and that in order to avoid suspicion, she would follow in the coming months.

The night of his escape, Michael barges into Kareyev's room and tells the Commandant that he has attempted to escape and reveals that Joan is his wife. Kareyev has his assistant, Comrade Fedossitch, place Michael in detention and tell Joan that she will be taking the ferry the next day to leave Strastnoy Island. Joan confesses her love for Kareyev and begs him to leave his post and escape with her and Michael, so that she and Kareyev can live together. Kareyev considers her offer but refuses, saying that he cannot betray his Party and his comrades. He tells Joan to pack her things to depart alone in the morning.

Fedossitch confronts Kareyev, telling him Joan should be arrested for deceiving them and the Party. Kareyev puts Fedossitch under arrest and then goes to Joan's room and tells her to follow him to the detention tower to free Michael, so all three of them can escape. The three board the ferry and make their way to shore where they commandeer a horse sled from a local farmer. As the trio make their way to shore, it is discovered that Michael, Joan, and Kareyev are no longer on the island and Fedossitch is freed by a fellow officer. Fedossitch finds that the radio is destroyed, so he alerts the shore of the escape using the monastery's bell and light signals.

Kareyev, Michael, and Joan attempt to flee to the merchant's house and are forced to seek shelter in an empty barn. The two men begin fighting over who should be with Joan. They ask her who she loves, but before Joan has the chance to answer they are discovered and arrested. The commanding officer reveals that Joan and the traitorous commandant are to be taken to the State Political Directorate headquarters in Nijni Kolimsk, mentioning that it is across the street from an English merchant's house. Joan realizes there is still hope if they can escape their cells and go across the street. However, the commander reveals that Michael is to be taken away for immediate execution. The soldier, unable to distinguish the two male captives, asks Joan to identify which man is her husband. Joan points to Kareyev and tells soldiers he is the one; he makes no objections. The screenplay ends as Kareyev is taken away for execution while Joan and Michael are driven to Nijni Kolimsk with the hope of escape and a future together.

== History ==
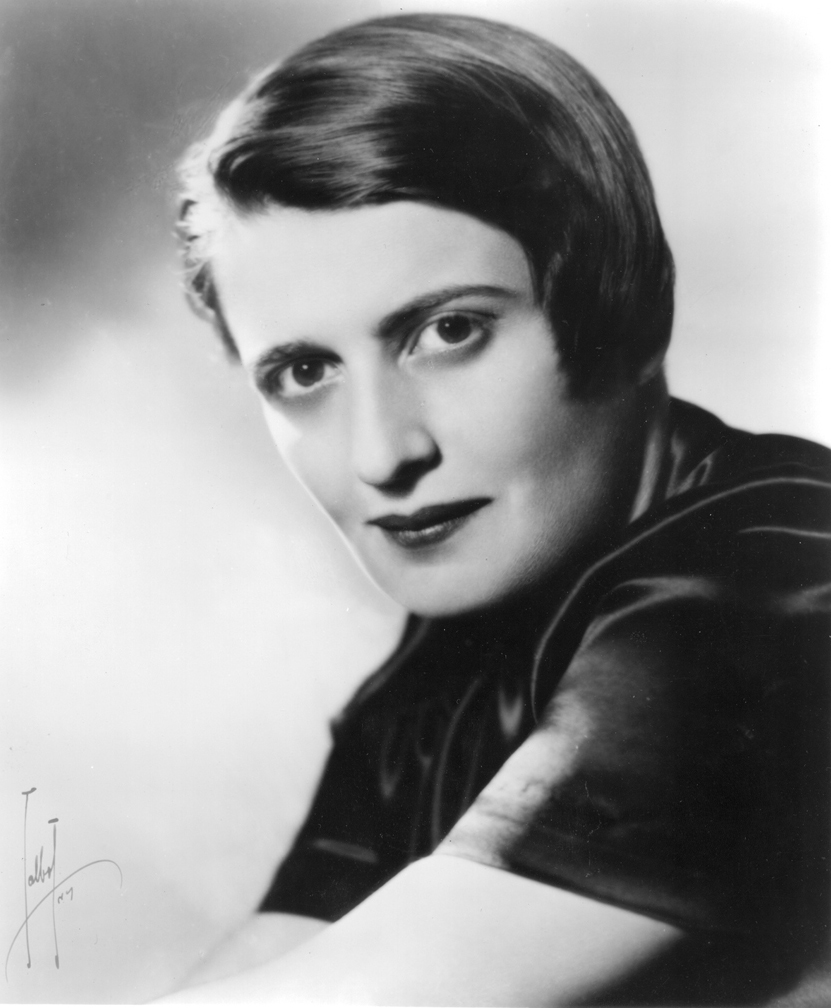
Ayn Rand wrote the screenplay.

Rand began writing Red Pawn in 1931. She had emigrated to the United States from the Soviet Union five years earlier. Prior to starting Red Pawn, she had worked as a junior screenwriter for Cecil B. DeMille; however, by 1931, she was working in the wardrobe department at RKO Studios. She had been writing her debut novel, We the Living, but took a break to write the screenplay in hopes of earning enough money to allow her to write full-time. She sold the screenplay and the synopsis to Universal Pictures in 1932 for $1,500, her first professional sale. The studio postponed the filming of the screenplay several times, and with Hollywood entering its Red Decade, the anti-Soviet themes of the film made it unattractive to filmmakers. Universal later traded the property to Paramount, which has held onto the rights since, although Red Pawn has never been filmed.

== Significance ==
Professor of literature at Anderson College Jena Trammell has cited Red Pawn as a crucial point in Rand's career and in the development of her aesthetic philosophy, romantic realism.

== Graphic novel ==
In March 21, 2021, a graphic novel version of Red Pawn was released by writer Jennifer Grossman and illustrator Daniel Parsons.
