= Larry J. Sechrest =

American economist (1946–2008)

Larry Sechrest
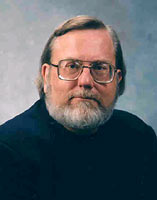
- Larry Sechrest
- Born: October 12, 1946; Detroit, Michigan
- Died: October 30, 2008 (aged 62); Alpine, Texas

Academic background
- Education: University of Texas at Arlington (Ph.D 1990, M.A. 1985, B.A. 1968)
- Influences: Edmund Burke, Friedrich Hayek, Ludwig von Mises, Ayn Rand, Murray Rothbard

Academic work
- Discipline: Economics
- School or tradition: Austrian School
- Institutions: Sul Ross State University (1990–2008)

Larry James Sechrest (/ˈsiːkrɛst/; October 12, 1946 – October 30, 2008) was an American economist who advocated the ideas of the Austrian School. He was a professor of economics at Sul Ross State University and was director of the university's Free Enterprise Institute.

== Career ==
After working as an instructor at the University of Texas at Arlington, Sechrest joined the faculty of Sul Ross State University in 1990. In 1991, he became director of its Free Enterprise Institute. In 1993, his book Free Banking: Theory, History, and a Laissez-Faire Model was published by Quorum Books. He became a full professor in 2002.

Sechrest was a libertarian and promoted the ideas of the Austrian School of economics. His early influences included the Austrian economists Ludwig von Mises, Friedrich Hayek and Murray Rothbard, as well as non-economists such as Edmund Burke and Ayn Rand. He supported free banking and anarcho-capitalism.

In 2004, Sechrest created controversy with an article he wrote for Liberty magazine. In the article, titled "A Strange Little Town in Texas", he described the town of Alpine, Texas, where Sul Ross State is located. He praised its weather, open spaces, and low crime rate, but said the residents were "stupid" and "inbred", dubbing the area "the proud home of some of the dumbest clods on the planet." He extended this critique to his employer, the university, declaring that its graduates were "still operating at about a tenth-grade level" and only got degrees "via the malfeasance of professors and administrators." When copies of the article circulated around town, the reaction was mostly hostile. He received death threats and obscene messages, and his property was vandalized. The president of Sul Ross State disavowed Sechrest's views, but could not take any formal action against him since Sechrest had tenure. Students threatened to boycott his classes. The town's mayor responded by declaring a "We Love Alpine Week" with a rally and parade. The controversy eventually tapered off and Sechrest continued teaching at the university.

Sechrest had numerous articles published in peer-reviewed journals, including the Journal of Economics, the South African Journal of Economic and Management Sciences, the Review of Austrian Economics, and Reason Papers. He also wrote for non-academic outlets such as Liberty, The Freeman, and Free Radical. He served on the editorial board of the Quarterly Journal of Austrian Economics and the advisory board of The Journal of Ayn Rand Studies. He was a member of the New York Academy of Sciences.

== Personal life ==
Sechrest was born on October 12, 1946, in Detroit, Michigan. At the age of 11 he moved with his family to Arlington, Texas. He graduated from Grand Prairie High School, and then received a Bachelor of Arts from the University of Texas at Arlington in 1968. He worked for many years in the hotel business, but eventually returned to the university to obtain his master's degree in 1985 and his Ph.D. 1990.

Sechrest died from heart failure on October 30, 2008. He was survived by his wife and by two children from an earlier marriage.

== Selected bibliography ==
- "White's Free Banking Thesis: A Case of Mistaken Identity". Review of Austrian Economics. November 1987, Vol. II, 247–257.
- "The Internal Paradigm of an Austrian Economist: Economics As If Reality Mattered". South African Journal of Economic and Management Sciences. November 1988, Vol. I, 1–13.
- "Free Banking vs. Central Banking: A Geometrical Analysis". South African Journal of Economic and Management Sciences. November 1989, Vol. II, 83–97.
- "Free Banking in Scotland: A Dissenting View". Cato Journal. Winter 1991, Vol. 10, No. 3, 799–808.
- "The Austrian Conception of Money: An Econometric Exercise". South African Journal of Economic and Management Sciences. Summer 1993, Vol. 11, 13–28.
- "Internal Marketing: The Key for External Marketing Success". Journal of Services Marketing. 1994, Vol. 8, No. 4, 5–13. Co-authored with Walter Greene and Gary Walls.
- "Delegating Pricing Authority in Mature Industries". Review of Business. Fall 1996, Vol. 18, No. 1, 19–24. Co-authored with Walter Greene and Gary Walls.
- "Purchasing Power Parity: An Alternative Approach". South African Journal of Economic and Management Sciences. Winter 1996, Vol. 19, 35–50.
- "Austrian and Monetarist Business Cycle Theories: Substitutes or Complements?". Advances in Austrian Economics. Fall 1997, Vol. 4, 7–31.
- "The Irrationality of the Extended Order: The Fatal Conceit of F. A. Hayek". Reason Papers. Fall 1998, No. 23, 38–65.
- Free Banking: Theory, History, and a Laissez-Faire Model. Westport, Connecticut: Quorum Books. 1993. ISBN 0-89930-815-5
- "Jean-Baptiste Say: Neglected Champion of Laissez-Faire". In 15 Great Austrian Economists. Edited by Randall G. Holcombe. Auburn, Alabama: Ludwig von Mises Institute. 1999. ISBN 0-945466-04-8
- "Rand, Anarchy, and Taxes". Journal of Ayn Rand Studies. Fall 1999, Vol. 1, No. 1, 87–105.
- "Taxation and Government Are Still Problematic". Journal of Ayn Rand Studies. Fall 2000, Vol. 2, No. 1, 163–287.
- "Capital, Credit, and the Medium Run". Quarterly Journal of Austrian Economics. Fall 2001, Vol. 4, No. 3, 63–77.
- "Privateering and National Defense: Naval Warfare for Private Profit". In The Myth of National Defense: Essays on the Theory and History of Security Production. Edited by Hans-Hermann Hoppe. Auburn, Alabama: Ludwig von Mises Institute. 2003. ISBN 0-945466-37-4
- "Public Goods and Private Solutions in Maritime History". Quarterly Journal of Austrian Economics. Summer 2004, Vol. 7, No. 2, 3–27.
- "Private Provision of Public Goods: Theoretical Issues and Some Examples from Maritime History". ICFAI Journal of Public Finance. August 2004, Vol. II, No. 3, 45–73.
- "Praxeology, Economics, and Law: Issues and Implications". Quarterly Journal of Austrian Economics. Winter 2004, Vol. 7, No. 4, 19–40. Reprinted in Philosophers of Capitalism: Menger, Mises, Rand, and Beyond. Edited by Edward W. Younkins. Lanham, Maryland: Lexington Books. 2005. ISBN 0-7391-1076-4
- "Alan Greenspan: Rand, Republicans, and Austrian Critics". Journal of Ayn Rand Studies. Spring 2005, Vol. 6, No. 2, 271–297.
- "Ayn Rand Among the Austrians". Journal of Ayn Rand Studies. Spring 2005, Vol. 6, No. 2, 241–250. Co-authored with Chris Matthew Sciabarra.
- "Public Goods and the Non-Neutrality of Taxes". ICFAI Journal of Public Finance. May 2005, Vol. III, No. 2, 62–71.
- "Explaining Malinvestment and Overinvestment". Quarterly Journal of Austrian Economics. Winter 2006, Vol. 9, No. 4, 27–38.
- "Atlas, Ayn, and Anarchy: A is A is A". In Ayn Rand's Atlas Shrugged: A Philosophical and Literary Companion. Edited by Edward W. Younkins. Burlington, Vermont: Ashgate Publishing. 2007. ISBN 978-0-7546-5533-6
- "Privately Funded and Built U.S. Warships in the Quasi-War of 1797–1801". The Independent Review. Summer 2007, Vol. 12, No. 1: 101–113.
