= Jerome Tuccille =

American libertarian writer (1937–2017)

- Born: May 30, 1937; The Bronx, New York, U.S.
- Died: February 16, 2017 (aged 79); Severna Park, Maryland
- Education: Manhattan College
- Occupations: Writer and activist
- Children: J. D. Tuccille
- Writing career
- Subject: American politics
- Notable work: It Usually Begins With Ayn Rand

Jerome Tuccille (May 30, 1937 – February 16, 2017) was an American writer and activist usually associated with the libertarian movement of American politics. In 1974, he ran for Governor of New York on the ticket of the Free Libertarian Party. His campaign included a publicity stunt where a blonde woman wearing a bodystocking rode a horse named "Taxpayer" through Central Park, alluding to the legend of Lady Godiva.

He worked as an investment manager and authored more than thirty books, including It Usually Begins With Ayn Rand (ISBN 978-0930073251). His other books included the first biography of Donald Trump, as well as biographies of Rupert Murdoch, Alan Greenspan, and the Hunts of Texas. Tuccille also wrote several novels and a memoir entitled Heretic: Confessions of an ex-Catholic Rebel (ASIN B0038M3DF6). He also wrote a history of black soldiers in the Spanish–American War called The Roughest Riders which is highly critical of Theodore Roosevelt.

Tuccille was born in the Bronx, New York, on May 30, 1937 and grew up in Throggs Neck, Bronx. He died at his home in Severna Park, Maryland, on February 16, 2017, due to complications from multiple myeloma.
