= For the New Intellectual =

1961 book by Ayn Rand

- Cover of the first edition
- Author: Ayn Rand
- Language: English
- Subject: Objectivism
- Publisher: Random House
- Publication date: 1961
- Publication place: United States
- Media type: Print (hardcover and paperback)
- Pages: 242 (hardcover); 192 (Centennial edition)
- ISBN: 0-451-16308-7 (Centennial edition)
- OCLC: 36698277

For the New Intellectual: The Philosophy of Ayn Rand is a 1961 work by the Russian-born American writer and philosopher Ayn Rand. It is her first long non-fiction book. Much of the material consists of excerpts from Rand's novels, supplemented by a long title essay that focuses on the history of philosophy.

== History ==
Starting from the mid-1930s, Russian-American author Ayn Rand had worked as a writer of fiction, including plays, screenplays, and novels. Her fiction, especially her novels, contained expressions of her political and philosophical ideas, often in the form of monologues delivered by her characters. Her most successful novels, The Fountainhead (1943) and Atlas Shrugged (1957), had attracted a group of admirers interested in Rand's ideas. She began delivering lectures at colleges, including one at Yale University in November 1960 titled "For the New Intellectual".

A revised version of the Yale speech became the title essay of For the New Intellectual, which was published by Random House in 1961. It was the first of several non-fiction volumes collecting Rand's essays and speeches. It was also the last book Rand published with Random House. She left the publisher following a dispute over her proposed next book. In 1963, a paperback edition was published by New American Library.

== Summary ==
The excerpts from Rand's novels are all speeches on various topics, with the clear majority of the speeches coming from her main novels The Fountainhead and Atlas Shrugged. Her novels Anthem and We the Living each contribute one excerpt. The speech from We The Living is spoken by the main female character Kira Argounova, to the communist Andrei Taganov (one of the two male lead characters).

There are three speeches from The Fountainhead: one by the antagonist Ellsworth Toohey, one which is actually more of a conversation between the sympathetic character Gail Wynand and the hero Howard Roark, and one which is Howard Roark's triumphant courtroom speech. The last is a statement of Rand's philosophy as it existed at the time of writing The Fountainhead, and is a testimony to the human spirit expressed in individual invention and achievement.

There are six excerpts from Atlas Shrugged, all speeches by various protagonists. The topics covered by the speeches are the philosophical nature of money, the psychology of sexual desire (of a man for a woman), the condemnation encountered by successful industrialists, socialized (i.e. government-regulated) medicine, the motivation of profit versus the public good (from the perspective of an industrialist), and a 60-page statement of Rand's philosophy of Objectivism.

The title essay discusses the history of philosophy with particular emphasis on what Rand sees as the grievous missteps and errors committed along the way. She uses two terms to illustrate the most notorious individuals who have played a role in the history of philosophy: "Attila" and "Witch Doctor". She categorizes various participants in human history, who have been a force for evil in her view, as being an "Attila" or "Witch Doctor". An "Attila" is someone in history who used physical ("brute") force to accomplish goals. A "Witch Doctor" is someone (often a philosopher, religious person, or other type of intellectual) who has used the written or spoken word to persuade people to go against their rational minds, often to the advantage of the "Attila" who is currently in power.

She concludes the title essay by saying that she hopes a type of "new intellectual" will gain prominence. The new intellectual will promote the use of reason to persuade others, as opposed to reliance on force, or the threat of force, in order to persuade by fear.

== Reception ==
The book received a number of reviews at the time of its release, although significantly fewer than Rand's novels had received. In The New York Times Book Review, the philosopher Sidney Hook called it a "unique combination of tautology and extravagant absurdity". In a negative review for Esquire, Gore Vidal said Rand "must be read to be believed" and that "[Rand's] 'philosophy' is nearly perfect in its immorality". In The New Republic, reviewer Joel Rosenbloom described Rand's philosophy as "pretentious nonsense" and predicted "little likelihood of an expanding future for Miss Rand's system or her following".

Rand bibliographer Mimi Reisel Gladstein called Rand's title essay the "major attraction for those who have already read the novels". The historian James T. Baker said the essay "represents Rand's first step from fiction to public philosophy", and called the view of history it presents "intriguing and creative if a bit fantastic". Biographer Anne Heller described it as "a mixture of historical parable and madcap fairy tale", and said it began Rand's "almost fanatical crusade" against German philosopher Immanuel Kant, whom Rand describes as a highly negative influence on modern philosophy.

== See also ==
- Bibliography of Ayn Rand and Objectivism
