= Chandran Kukathas =

Australian political scientist

- Born: 12 September 1957 (age 69); The Federation of Malaya
- Education: Australian National University; University of New South Wales; University of Oxford
- Occupation: Political theorist
- Employer: Singapore Management University

Chandran Kukathas (born 12 September 1957) is a Malaysian-born Australian political theorist and the author of several books. Until 2019 he was Head of the Department of Government at the London School of Economics, where he held a Chair in Political Theory. Since 2019, he has been a professor of Political Science at Singapore Management University.

== Early life ==
Chandran Kukathas was born on 12 September 1957 in The Federation of Malaya which later became a part of Malaysia. He obtained a BA in History and Political Science from Australian National University and an MA in Politics from University of New South Wales. He earned his DPhil in Politics from the University of Oxford, where he cofounded the Oxford Hayek Society.

== Career ==
Kukathas has taught at the Australian Defence Force Academy campus of the University of New South Wales, the University of Oxford, and the Australian National University. He was the 1986–87 R.C. Hoiles Postdoctoral Fellow at the Institute for Humane Studies at George Mason University. He was, from 2003 to 2007, the Neal A. Maxwell Professor of Political Theory, Public Policy and Public Service in the Department of Political Science at the University of Utah. He has held visiting positions at the Social Philosophy and Policy Center, Bowling Green State University (1991) and the Murphy Institute, Tulane University (2003). He has also been a visiting professor in the departments of Political Science and Philosophy at the National University of Singapore.

Kukathas held a chair in Political Theory in the Department of Government at the London School of Economics. He serves on the advisory board of the Institute of Economic Affairs. Kukathas is currently a professor of political science at Singapore Management University, where he served as the Dean of the School of Social Sciences from 2019 to 2024.

Kukathas supports a radically minimalist form of political liberalism, where there are multiple forms of authority, each of which is legitimate.

== Bibliography ==
- Kukathas, Chandran (1989). Hayek and Modern Liberalism. Oxford, UK: Oxford University Press. ISBN 9780198273264. OCLC 19325329.
- Kukathas, Chandran; Pettit, Phillip (1990). Rawls: A Theory of Justice and Its Critics. Stanford, CA: Stanford University Press. ISBN 9780804717687. OCLC 23017999.
- Kukathas, Chandran (2003). The Liberal Archipelago: A Theory of Diversity and Freedom. Oxford, UK: Oxford University Press. ISBN 9780199257546. OCLC 60561912.
- Kukathas, Chandran (2021). Immigration and Freedom. Princeton, NJ: Princeton University Press. ISBN 9780691189680. OCLC 1256433970.
