= The Romantic Manifesto =

1969 book by Ayn Rand

- Cover of the first edition
- Author: Ayn Rand
- Language: English
- Subject: Aesthetics
- Publisher: New American Library
- Publication date: 1969 (1st edition); 1975 (2nd edition)
- Publication place: United States
- Media type: Print (Hardcover and Paperback)
- Pages: 199 (Centennial edition)
- ISBN: 0-451-14916-5 (Centennial edition)
- OCLC: 61543

The Romantic Manifesto: A Philosophy of Literature is a collection of essays regarding the nature of art by the writer and philosopher Ayn Rand. It was first published in 1969, with a second, revised edition published in 1975. Most of the essays are reprinted from Rand's magazine The Objectivist.

== Summary ==
Rand defines art as “a selective re-creation of reality according to an artist’s metaphysical value-judgments.” She holds that art functions as a concretization of an artist’s fundamental view of existence, serving the cognitive function of making abstract philosophical values available to direct perception.

The process of artistic selection and of isolating elements of reality for reproduction in an artwork reveals an artist’s implicit worldview and what Rand terms a “sense of life," which she defines as: “a pre-conceptual equivalent of metaphysics, an emotional, subconsciously integrated appraisal of man and of existence.” According to Rand, the pleasure one experiences in response to art arises from a spiritual vision of a world in which one’s most fundamental values and long-range goals have been realized.

Rand maintains that although individual tastes differ, art can be objectively evaluated by reference to the consistency, integration, and clarity of an artist’s philosophical theme. While she holds that art necessarily embodies moral values, she rejects the idea that its purpose is didactic, writing that “the basic purpose of art is not to teach, but to show—to hold up to man a concretized image of his nature and his place in the universe.”

Throughout The Romantic Manifesto, Rand contrasts Romanticism in art—which she associates with the recognition of free will and the portrayal of man as a volitional, goal-directed being—with Naturalism, which she criticizes for depicting humans as passive products of environment or fate. She defends Romantic art, particularly the works of Victor Hugo, as embodying man’s potential for moral purpose and greatness. (In doing so, she distinguishes artistic Romanticism from the philosophical movement of the same name, which she strongly opposed.)

The first eleven of the book’s twelve chapters consist of essays originally published in periodicals and an introduction to an edition of Victor Hugo. The final chapter is a short story entitled “The Simplest Thing in the World.”

== Publication history ==
Most of the essays in the book originally appeared in The Objectivist, except for the "Introduction to Ninety-Three", which was an introduction for an English-language edition of the Victor Hugo novel. The first edition of The Romantic Manifesto was published by The World Publishing Company in 1969. It was Rand's first book to be published after her break with her former protégé Nathaniel Branden, and unlike her two previous essay collections it did not contain material by Branden or any other authors besides Rand. A paperback edition was published by New American Library in 1971. The revised edition in 1975 added the essay "Art and Cognition".

== Reception ==
Upon its initial release, The Romantic Manifesto received only a few reviews. Most of these were brief and negative, and even the longer reviews paid little attention to the details of Rand's aesthetic theory. From then until the late 1990s, The Romantic Manifesto and Rand's aesthetic theory in general received little attention, leading Rand scholar Chris Matthew Sciabarra to refer to it as "a nearly forgotten book in the Randian canon". One of the few exceptions was a 1986 journal article by literature professor Stephen D. Cox, in which he contrasted Rand's formal aesthetic theory from the book with her own practices as an author of fiction, arguing that her practice contradicted some of her theoretical points. Another exception was a chapter on Rand's aesthetics in Objectivism: The Philosophy of Ayn Rand, a detailed presentation of her ideas by her friend and heir Leonard Peikoff. Overall this period was described by one later critic as a time of "benign neglect", when even Rand's admirers wrote little about her ideas on art.

Mimi Reisel Gladstein described the book as "perhaps the most unified and coherent of Rand's nonfiction works." However, the historian James T. Baker contrasted the book with Rand's approach in her book Introduction to Objectivist Epistemology, most of which was written as a single work. Baker described The Romantic Manifesto as lacking the "systematic" approach of the other book. Barry Vacker said that while the book "offers unique and valuable insights", it fails to "present a complete philosophy of fine art".

As of 2008, the book had sold over 350,000 copies.
