= We the Living =

Novel by Ayn Rand

- Cover of the first edition
- Author: Ayn Rand
- Language: English
- Genre: Historical fiction, semi-autobiographic
- Publisher: Macmillan (first); Random House (revised)
- Publication date: 1936 (Macmillan); 1959 (Random House)
- Publication place: United States
- OCLC: 34187185

We the Living is the debut novel of the Russian-born American author Ayn Rand. It is a story of life in post-revolutionary Russia and was Rand's first statement against communism. Rand observes in the foreword that We the Living was the closest she would ever come to writing an autobiography. Rand finished writing the novel in 1934, but it was rejected by several publishers before being released by Macmillan Publishing in 1936. It has since sold more than three million copies.

== Plot ==
The story takes place from 1922 to 1925, in post-revolutionary Russia. Kira Argounova, the protagonist of the story, is the younger daughter of a bourgeois family. An independent spirit with a will to match, she rejects any attempt by her family or the nascent Soviet state to cast her into a mold. At the beginning of the story, Kira returns to Petrograd with her family, after a prolonged exile due to the assault of the Bolshevik revolutionaries. Kira's father had been the owner of a textile factory, which was seized and nationalized. Having given up all hopes of regaining their past possessions after the victories of the Red Army, the family returns to the city in search of livelihood. They find that their home has also been seized and converted to living quarters for several families.

Kira's family eventually manages to find living quarters, and Kira's father gets a license to open a textile shop, an establishment that is but a shadow of his old firm. Life is excruciatingly difficult in these times; living standards are poor, and weary citizens wait in long queues for meager rations of food and fuel. With some effort, Kira manages to obtain her Labor Book, which permits her to study and work. Kira also manages to enroll in the Technological Institute, where she aspires to fulfill her dream of becoming an engineer. At the Institute, Kira meets fellow student Andrei Taganov, an idealistic Communist and an officer in the GPU (the Soviet secret police). The two share a mutual respect and admiration for each other in spite of their differing political beliefs, and become friends.

In a chance encounter, Kira meets Leo Kovalensky, an attractive man with a free spirit. It is love at first sight for Kira, and she throws herself at Leo, who initially takes her to be a prostitute. He is also strongly attracted to her and promises to meet her again. Kira and Leo are shown to be united by their desperate lives and their beliefs that run counter to what is being thrust on them by the state. After a couple of meetings, when they share their deep contempt for the state of their lives, the two plan to escape the country together.

Kira and Leo are caught while attempting to flee the country, but escape imprisonment with the help of a GPU officer who knew Leo's father before the revolution. Kira leaves her parents' apartment and moves into Leo's. She is expelled from the Technological Institute as the result of a purge of all students connected to the bourgeoisie, and she loses her job as well. The relationship between Kira and Leo, intense and passionate in the beginning, begins to deteriorate under the weight of their hardships and their different reactions. Kira keeps her ideas and aspirations alive, but decides to go along with the system until she feels powerful enough to challenge it. Leo, in contrast, sinks slowly into indifference and depression. He contracts tuberculosis and is prescribed treatment in a sanatorium. Kira's efforts to finance his treatment fail, and her appeals to the authorities to get state help fall on deaf ears.

As Kira's relationship with Leo evolves, so does her relationship with Andrei. Despite their political differences, she finds Andrei to be the one person with whom she can discuss her most intimate thoughts and views. Andrei's affection and respect for Kira slowly turns into love. When he confesses his love to Kira, she is dismayed but also desperate, so she feigns love for Andrei and agrees to become his mistress. She uses money from Andrei to fund Leo's treatment.

Leo returns cured of tuberculosis and healthy, but a changed man. He opens a food store that is a front for black market trade, bribing a GPU officer to look the other way. Andrei, who is concerned that corruption is damaging the communist state, starts investigating the store. He arrests Leo and in the process discovers that Kira has secretly been living with Leo. Disillusioned about both his personal relationship and his political ideals, Andrei secures Leo's release and shortly thereafter commits suicide. Kira, perhaps the only genuine mourner at his state funeral, wonders if she has killed him. Having lost any moral sense that he may have left, Leo leaves Kira to begin a new life as a gigolo. After Leo's departure, Kira makes a final attempt to cross the border. Almost in sight of freedom, she is shot by a border guard and dies.

== Publication history ==
=== Background ===
Ayn Rand was born in 1905 in Saint Petersburg, then capital of the Russian Empire, to a bourgeois family whose property was expropriated by the Bolshevik government after the 1917 Russian Revolution. Concerned about her safety due to her strong anti-communist views, Rand's family helped her emigrate to the United States in 1926. She moved to Hollywood, where she obtained a job as a junior screenwriter and also worked on other writing projects. In 1929 she began a novel under the working title Airtight: A Novel of Red Russia; it drew on her experiences to depict life in the Soviet Union in the 1920s and criticize the Soviet government and communist ideology.

=== Initial publication ===
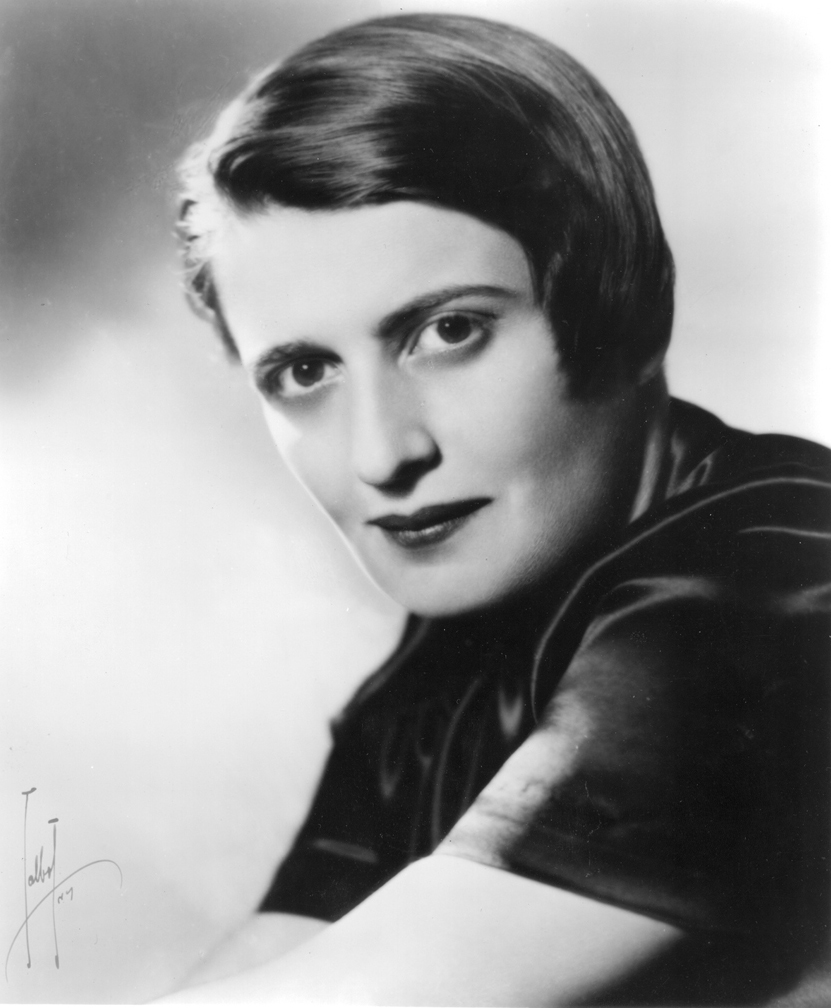
Ayn Rand completed the novel in 1934.

The novel was first completed in 1934. Despite support from H. L. Mencken, who deemed it "a really excellent piece of work", it was rejected by several publishers until September 1935, when George Platt Brett of Macmillan Publishing agreed to publish it. Brett's decision was not without controversy within Macmillan. Associate editor Granville Hicks, then a member of the Communist Party USA, was strongly opposed to publishing Rand's novel. Rand later said that Brett was unsure whether the novel would turn a profit, but he thought it was a book that ought to be published. The first edition was issued on April 7, 1936.

The initial American publication of We the Living was not a commercial success. Macmillan did not expect the novel to sell and did little marketing. Initial sales were slow and although they picked up later, Macmillan destroyed the plates before the first printing of 3000 copies sold out. Eighteen months after its release, the novel was out of print. Rand's royalties from the first American edition amounted to $100.

There was also a British publication by Cassell in January 1937, and editions were published in Denmark and Italy. These did considerably better than the American release, remaining in print into the 1940s.

=== Revised edition ===
In 1957, Rand's novel Atlas Shrugged became a best-seller for Random House. Its success motivated them to republish We the Living in 1959. In preparation for the new edition, Rand made some changes to the text. In her foreword to the revised edition, Rand declared that "In brief, all the changes are merely editorial line changes." Rand's description notwithstanding, some of the changes have been taken to have philosophical significance. In the first edition, Kira said to Andrei, "I loathe your ideals. I admire your methods." In the second edition, this became simply "I loathe your ideals." A few pages later, Kira said to Andrei, "What are your masses but mud to be ground underfoot, fuel to be burned for those who deserve it?" Rand's revision deleted this sentence.

The significance of these and other revisions has been debated. Rand scholar Mimi Reisel Gladstein commented, "She claims that the revision was minimal. Some readers of both editions have questioned her definition of 'minimal'." According to Ronald Merrill, Kira in the first edition "adopts in the most explicit terms possible the ethical position of Friedrich Nietzsche". Rand had made her break with Nietzsche by the time she published The Fountainhead. Canadian writer Barbara Branden said that "Some of her readers were disturbed when they discovered this and similar changes", but insisted that "unlike Nietzsche, she rejected as unforgivably immoral any suggestion that the superior man had the right to use physical force as a means to his end." Robert Mayhew cautioned that "We should not conclude too quickly that these passages are strong evidence of an earlier Nietzschean phase in Ayn Rand's development, because such language can be strictly metaphorical (even if the result of an early interest in Nietzsche)". Susan Love Brown countered that "Mayhew becomes an apologist for Rand's denials of change and smooths over the fact that Rand herself saw the error of her ways and corrected them."

Nearly everyone who reads We the Living today reads the second edition. The first is a rare book; the second has sold over three million copies.

=== Deleted passages ===
Some passages were deleted during publication, which were posthumously published in section 2 of The Early Ayn Rand in 1984 for the first time.

=== Release details ===
- 1936, Macmillan, hardback
- 1937, Cassell, hardback
- 1959, revised edition, Random House, hardback
- 1960, revised edition, New American Library, paperback
- 1996, 60th Anniversary edition, New American Library ISBN 0-451-18784-9, paperback
- 2011, 75th Anniversary edition, Signet, paperback

== Reception and influence ==
Rand believed that We the Living was not widely reviewed; however, Rand scholar Michael S. Berliner says "it was the most reviewed of any of her works", with approximately 125 different reviews being published in more than 200 publications. Overall these reviews were mixed, but more positive than the reviews she received for her later work. In The New York Times, reviewer Harold Strauss said Rand had "a good deal of narrative skill", but the novel was "slavishly warped to the dictates of propaganda" against the Soviets. Kirkus Reviews called it a "first rate" representation of the realities of life in Soviet Russia. In his syndicated "A Book a Day" column, Bruce Catton called it "a tragic story" about the harmful impact of revolution on the middle class. Ethel Lockwood recommended it as a realistic look at the impact of Soviet policies, but warned it was not for the "squeamish" or those unaccustomed to "the continental viewpoint toward sex relationships".

When the book was released in Australia, it received several positive reviews. In the Australian Women's Weekly, news editor Leslie Haylen described the novel as "very vivid, human, and wholly satisfying", saying it described Russian life without taking sides. The Barrier Miner said it was "entertaining" and "intensely moving", and not at all propaganda. The Wodonga and Towong Sentinel called it a "vivid story" that showed Russia "dispassionately, without once imposing any preconceived ideas on the reader".

Rand scholar Mimi Reisel Gladstein compared it to two of her later novels, saying, "While it does not have the power of The Fountainhead or the majestic sweep of Atlas Shrugged, We the Living is still a compelling story about interesting characters." Literary professor Shoshana Milgram connected the novel's themes to those of Rand's 1938 novella Anthem: both address individualism and the word I, and Anthem heroine Liberty 5-3000 is reminiscent of Kira, both being "strong and defiant" women who are submissive with their respective male protagonists. Historian James Baker said it was "preachy" and "indoctrinated without entertaining".

== Adaptations ==
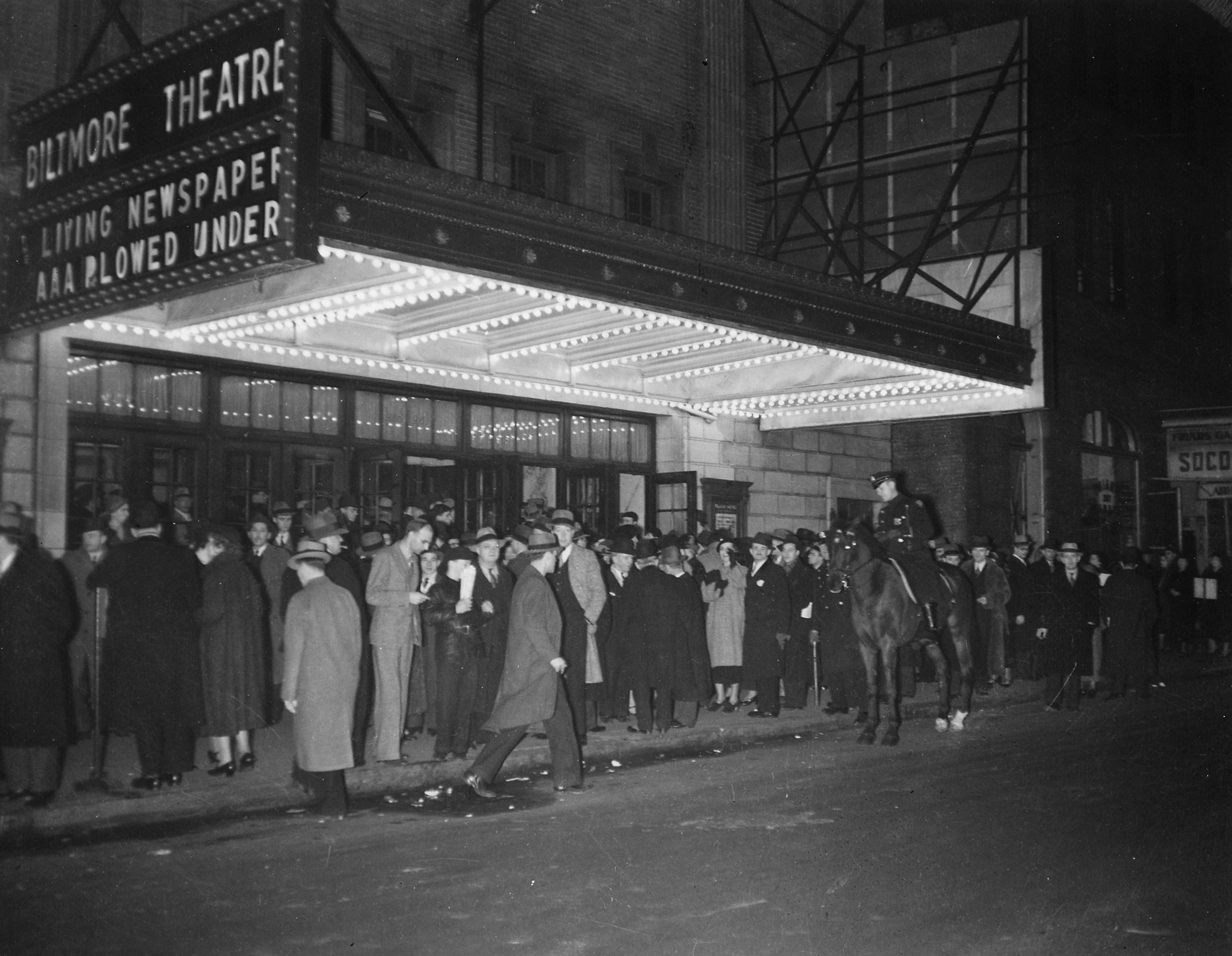
The stage adaptation appeared at the Biltmore Theatre in 1940.

=== Play ===
Shortly after the novel was published, Rand began negotiations with Broadway producer Jerome Mayer to do a theatrical adaptation. Rand wrote the script, but Mayer's financing fell through. Several years later, she was able to interest George Abbott in producing the play. Helen Craig took the lead role as Kira, alongside John Emery as Leo and Dean Jagger as Andrei. It opened under the title The Unconquered at the Biltmore Theatre on February 13, 1940, but closed just five days later after scathing reviews.

The play was not published during Rand's lifetime. In 2014, Palgrave Macmillan published a volume with both the final script and an earlier version, edited by Robert Mayhew.

=== Film ===
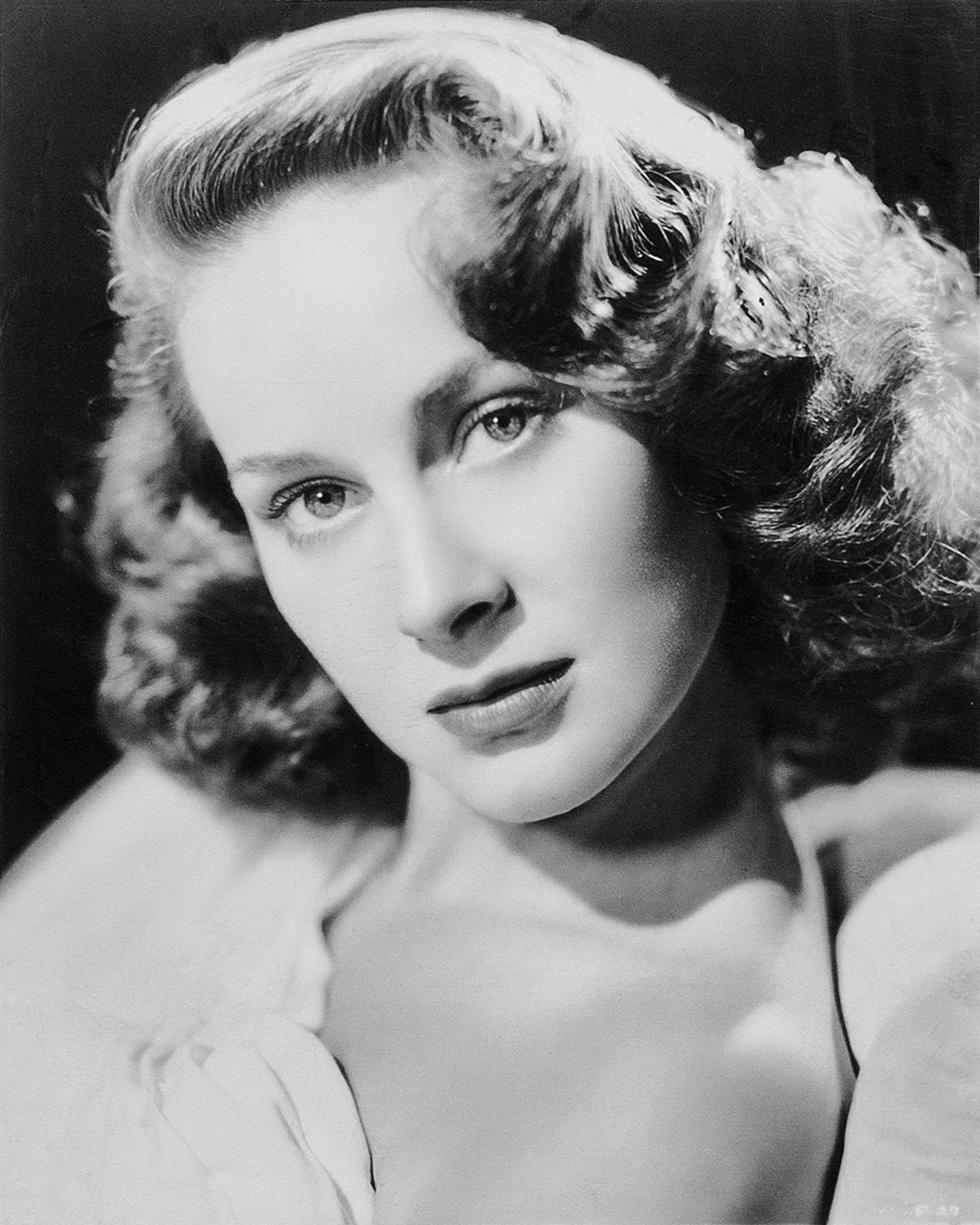
Alida Valli starred in the film adaptation.

We the Living was published in an Italian translation in 1937. Without Rand's permission, it was adapted in 1942 as an Italian film, released in two parts, titled Noi Vivi (We the Living) and Addio Kira (Goodbye Kira). The films were directed by Goffredo Alessandrini for Scalera Films of Rome, and starred Alida Valli as Kira, Fosco Giachetti as Andrei, and Rossano Brazzi as Leo. Prior to their release, the films were nearly censored by Mussolini's government, but they were permitted because the story itself was set in Soviet Russia and was directly critical of that regime. The films were successful, and the public easily realized that they were as much against fascism as communism. After several weeks, German authorities, who were allied with the Italian government, insisted that the film be pulled from distribution because of its anti-Fascist themes.

Rediscovered in the 1960s through the efforts of Rand's lawyers, Erika Holzer and Henry Mark Holzer, these films were re-edited into a new version with English subtitles composed by Erika Holzer and revision co-producer Duncan Scott. This version, approved by Rand and her estate, was re-released as We the Living in 1986.
