= Bibliography of Ayn Rand and Objectivism =

This is a bibliography for Ayn Rand and Objectivism. Objectivism is a philosophical system initially developed in the 20th century by Rand.

== Works by Rand ==
The lists below provide information on Rand's major works and collections. Where there are multiple editions, the primary information listed is for the first regular trade edition, with notes following about other editions if they involve revisions or additions to the content. For dramatic works, date of first production is used instead of date of first publication. Individual essays, short stories and other short items are not listed separately, but most are reproduced in the items below.

=== Fiction ===
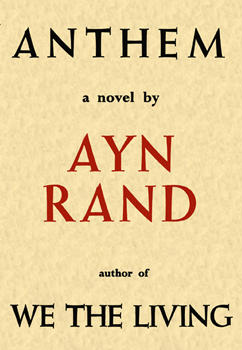
First edition cover of Anthem

==== Novels and short stories ====
- Ideal (written in 1934, published in 2015). NAL. ISBN 0451475550.
- We the Living (1936). New York: Macmillan. Revised edition published by Random House in 1959. 60th anniversary edition published by New American Library in 1996, includes an introduction by Leonard Peikoff, ISBN 0-525-94054-5.
- Anthem (1938). London: Cassell and Company. Revised edition published by Pamphleteers in 1946. 50th anniversary edition published by Dutton in 1995, includes the revised edition text plus a facsimile of the first edition, ISBN 0-525-94015-4.
- The Fountainhead (1943). New York: Bobbs-Merrill. 25th anniversary edition published by New American Library in 1971, includes a new introduction by Rand. 50th anniversary edition published by Bobbs-Merrill in 1993, includes an afterword by Leonard Peikoff, ISBN 0-451-17512-3.
- Atlas Shrugged (1957). New York: Random House. 35th anniversary edition published by Dutton in 1992, includes an introduction by Leonard Peikoff, ISBN 0-525-93418-9.
- The Early Ayn Rand: A Selection from Her Unpublished Fiction (1984). Leonard Peikoff, ed. New York: New American Library. ISBN 0-453-00465-2. Expanded second edition published in 2005, ISBN 0-451-21465-X.

==== Drama ====
- Night of January 16th (1934). Stage play. Produced in Los Angeles as Woman on Trial, then on Broadway as Night of January 16th. Player's book and director's manuscript with edits by Nathaniel Edward Reeid published in 1936. Revised version by Rand published by The World Publishing in 1968.
- The Unconquered (1940). Stage adaptation of We the Living. Two versions of the script, edited by Robert Mayhew, published by Palgrave Macmillan in 2014
- Love Letters (1945). Screenplay.
- You Came Along (1945). Screenplay, co-written with Robert Smith.
- The Fountainhead (1949). Screenplay adaptation of her own novel.
- Ideal (1989). New York: New American Library. ISBN 0-451-47555-0. Stage play, published in The Early Ayn Rand prior to first production.
- Three Plays (2005). Richard E. Ralston, ed. New York: New American Library. ISBN 0-451-21466-8. Anthology of plays, including Night of January 16th, Ideal, and Think Twice.

=== Non-fiction books ===
- For the New Intellectual: The Philosophy of Ayn Rand (1961). New York: Random House.
- The Virtue of Selfishness: A New Concept of Egoism (1964). New York: New American Library. Includes essays by Nathaniel Branden. Introduction was revised in 1970.
- Capitalism: The Unknown Ideal (1966). New York: New American Library. Includes essays by Nathaniel Branden, Alan Greenspan, and Robert Hessen. Expanded second edition published by New American Library in 1967. Introduction was revised in 1970.
- The Romantic Manifesto: A Philosophy of Literature (1969). New York: The World Publishing. Expanded second edition published by New American Library in 1975.
- The New Left: The Anti-Industrial Revolution (1971). New York: New American Library. Expanded second edition published by New American Library in 1975. See also Return of the Primitive below.
- Introduction to Objectivist Epistemology (1979). New York: New American Library. ISBN 0-451-61751-7. Includes an essay by Leonard Peikoff. A booklet of Rand's title essay was published by The Objectivist in 1967. Expanded second edition published by Meridian in 1990, edited by Harry Binswanger and Leonard Peikoff, ISBN 0-453-00724-4.

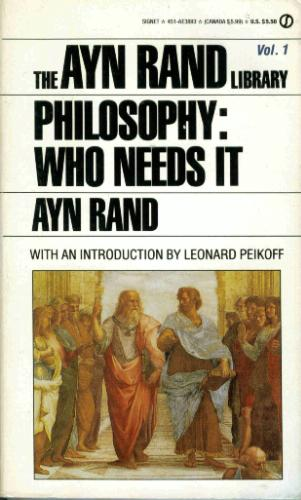
Paperback cover of Philosophy: Who Needs It

- Philosophy: Who Needs It (1982). Leonard Peikoff, ed. New York: Bobbs-Merrill. ISBN 0-672-52725-1.
- The Voice of Reason: Essays in Objectivist Thought (1989). Leonard Peikoff, ed. New York: New American Library. ISBN 0-453-00634-5. Includes essays by Leonard Peikoff and Peter Schwartz.
- The Ayn Rand Column: Written for the Los Angeles Times (1991). Peter Schwartz, ed. Oceanside, California: Second Renaissance Books. ISBN 1-56114-099-6. Expanded second edition published by Second Renaissance Books in 1998, ISBN 1-56114-292-1. A collection of twenty-six newspaper columns that Rand wrote for the Los Angeles Times from 1962 on, as well as six essays (with an additional three in the revised edition).
- Ayn Rand's Marginalia: Her Critical Comments on the Writings of Over 20 Authors (1995). Robert Mayhew, ed. New Milford, Connecticut: Second Renaissance Books. ISBN 1-56114-250-6
- Letters of Ayn Rand (1995). Michael S. Berliner, ed. New York: Dutton. ISBN 0-525-93946-6. Includes an introduction by Leonard Peikoff.
- Journals of Ayn Rand (1997). David Harriman, ed. New York: Dutton. ISBN 0-525-94370-6. Includes a foreword by Leonard Peikoff.
- The Ayn Rand Reader (1999) Gary Hull and Leonard Peikoff, eds. New York: Plume. ISBN 0-452-28040-0.
- Return of the Primitive: The Anti-Industrial Revolution (1999). Peter Schwartz, ed. New York: Meridian. ISBN 0-452-01184-1. Revised edition of Rand's earlier book, The New Left, and includes essays by Schwartz.
- Russian Writings on Hollywood (1999). Michael S. Berliner, ed.; Dina Garmong, trans. Los Angeles: Ayn Rand Institute Press. ISBN 0-9625336-3-7. Reproduces and translates two booklets previously published in Russia without Rand's knowledge.
- Why Businessmen Need Philosophy (1999). Richard E. Ralston, ed. Los Angeles: Ayn Rand Institute Press. ISBN 0-9625336-2-9. Includes essays by Leonard Peikoff, Harry Binswanger, Edwin A. Locke, John Ridpath, Richard M. Salsman, and Jaana Woiceshyn.
- The Art of Fiction: A Guide for Writers and Readers (2000). Tore Boeckmann, ed. New York: Plume. ISBN 0-452-28154-7. Includes an introduction by Leonard Peikoff.
- The Art of Nonfiction: A Guide for Writers and Readers (2001). Robert Mayhew, ed. New York: Plume. ISBN 0-452-28231-4. Includes an introduction by Peter Schwartz.
- Ayn Rand Answers: The Best of Her Q & A (2005). Robert Mayhew, ed. New York: New American Library. ISBN 0-451-21665-2.

=== Periodicals edited by Ayn Rand ===
- The Objectivist Newsletter. Vols. 1–4. 1962–1965. Co-edited with Nathaniel Branden.
- The Objectivist. Vols. 5–10. 1966–1971. Co-edited with Nathaniel Branden through the April 1968 issue (Volume 7, Issue 4), then solely by Rand. Volume numbering carried over from The Objectivist Newsletter.
- The Ayn Rand Letter. Vols. 1–4. 1971–1976.

== Books about Rand or Objectivism ==
The books listed below are either entirely about Ayn Rand/Objectivism or contain multiple relevant chapters/essays. The main body of the list consists of books about Objectivist ideas published by academic, commercial or institutional presses. A special subsection lists books about Rand's life and writing. For books with a single relevant chapter or essay, see the list of other works below.

- Badhwar, Neera K. (2001). Is Virtue Only a Means to Happiness?. Objectivist Studies Monographs. Poughkeepsie, New York: The Objectivist Center. ISBN 1-57724-059-6.
- Bernstein, Andrew (2005). The Capitalist Manifesto: The Historic, Economic and Philosophic Case for Laissez-faire. Lanham, Maryland: University Press of America. ISBN 0-7618-3220-3.
- Bernstein, Andrew (2009). Objectivism in One Lesson: An Introduction to the Philosophy of Ayn Rand. Lanham, Maryland: Hamilton Books. ISBN 978-0-7618-4359-7.
- ———————— (2009). Ayn Rand for Beginners. For Beginners series. Illustrations by Own Brozman. Hanover, New Hampshire: Steerforth Press. ISBN 978-1-934389-37-9.
- Biddle, Craig (2001). Loving Life: The Morality of Self-Interest and the Facts that Support It. Glen Allen, Virginia: Glen Allen Press. ISBN 0-9713737-0-1.
- Binswanger, Harry (1986). The Ayn Rand Lexicon: Objectivism from A to Z. New York: New American Library. ISBN 0-453-00528-4.
- ———————— (1990). The Biological Basis of Teleological Concepts. Los Angeles: Ayn Rand Institute Press. ISBN 0-9625336-0-2.
- Bishop, Lloyd (2001). In Defense of Altruism: Inadequacies of Ayn Rand's Ethics and Psychological Egoism. New Orleans: University Press of the South. ISBN 1-889431-79-6.
- Branden, Nathaniel (1969). The Psychology of Self-Esteem: A New Concept of Man's Psychological Nature. Los Angeles: Nash Publishing. ISBN 0-8402-1109-0.
- ————————— (1983). Honoring the Self. Los Angeles: J.P. Tarcher. ISBN 0-87477-270-2.
- ————————— (2009). The Vision of Ayn Rand: The Basic Principles of Objectivism. Cobden Press. ISBN 978-0-9819536-2-5.
- Brook, Yaron & Watkins, Don (2012). Free Market Revolution: How Ayn Rand's Ideas Can End Big Government. New York: Palgrave Macmillan. ISBN 978-0-230-34169-2. OCLC 775664136.
- Buechner, M. Northrup (2011). Objective Economics: How Ayn Rand's Philosophy Changes Everything about Economics. Lanham, Maryland: University Press of America. ISBN 978-0-7618-5481-4.
- Childs, Roy A. Jr. (1994). Taylor, Joan Kennedy (ed.). Liberty Against Power. San Francisco: Fox & Wilkes. ISBN 0-930073-13-4.
- Den Uyl, Douglas & Rasmussen, Douglas, eds. (1984). The Philosophic Thought of Ayn Rand. Chicago: University of Illinois Press. ISBN 0-252-01033-7. OCLC 9392804.
- Ellis, Albert (2006). Are Capitalism, Objectivism, and Libertarianism Religions? Yes!. Santa Barbara, California: Walden Three. ISBN 1-4348-0885-8. Revised and retitled edition of a 1968 book, originally titled Is Objectivism a Religion?
- Gladstein, Mimi Reisel & Sciabarra, Chris Matthew, eds. (1999). Feminist Interpretations of Ayn Rand. Re-reading the Canon. University Park, Pennsylvania: Pennsylvania State University Press. ISBN 0-271-01830-5.
- Gotthelf, Allan (2000). On Ayn Rand. Wadsworth Philosophers Series. Belmont, California: Wadsworth Publishing. ISBN 0-534-57625-7.
- Gotthelf, Allan & Lennox, James G., eds. (2010). Metaethics, Egoism, and Virtue: Studies in Ayn Rand's Normative Theory. Ayn Rand Society Philosophical Studies. Pittsburgh: University of Pittsburgh Press. ISBN 978-0-8229-4400-3. OCLC 617508678.
- Gotthelf, Allan & Lennox, James G., eds. (2013). Concepts and Their Role in Knowledge: Reflections on Objectivist Epistemology. Ayn Rand Society Philosophical Studies. Pittsburgh: University of Pittsburgh Press. ISBN 978-0-8229-4424-9. OCLC 828682539.
- Gotthelf, Allan & Salmieri, Gregory, eds. (2016). A Companion to Ayn Rand. Blackwell Companions to Philosophy. Chichester, United Kingdom: Wiley Blackwell. ISBN 978-1-4051-8684-1. OCLC 932124553.
- Harriman, David (2010). The Logical Leap: Induction in Physics. New York: New American Library. ISBN 978-0-451-23005-8. OCLC 462902937. With an introduction by Leonard Peikoff.
- Hessen, Robert (1979). In Defense of the Corporation. Stanford, California: Hoover Institution Press. ISBN 0-8179-7071-1. OCLC 4854728.
- Hudgins, Edward (2008). An Objectivist Secular Reader. Washington, DC: The Atlas Society. ISBN 978-978-098-152-5.
- Kelley, David (1986). The Evidence of the Senses: A Realist Theory of Perception. Baton Rouge, Louisiana: Louisiana State University Press. ISBN 0-8071-1268-2. OCLC 12262170.
- —————— (2000). The Contested Legacy of Ayn Rand: Truth and Toleration in Objectivism (paperback ed.). New Brunswick, New Jersey: Transaction Publishers. ISBN 0-7658-0863-3. OCLC 44727861. Revised and retitled edition of a 1990 book, originally titled Truth and Toleration.
- Long, Roderick T. (2000). Reason and Value: Rand versus Aristotle. Objectivist Studies Monographs. Poughkeepsie, New York: The Objectivist Center. ISBN 1-57724-045-6. OCLC 49875339.
- Machan, Tibor R. (2000). Ayn Rand. Masterworks in the Western Tradition. New York: Peter Lang Publishing. ISBN 0-8204-4144-9. OCLC 41096316.
- ———————, ed. (2006). Ayn Rand at 100. New Delhi, India: Pragun Publications. ISBN 81-89645-57-9. OCLC 76829742.
- Merrill, Ronald E. (1991). The Ideas of Ayn Rand. La Salle, Illinois: Open Court Publishing. ISBN 0-8126-9157-1. OCLC 23254190.
- O'Neill, William F. (1971). With Charity Toward None: An Analysis of Ayn Rand's Philosophy. New York: Philosophical Library. ISBN 0-8022-2034-7. OCLC 133489.
- Paul, Ellen Frankel; Miller, Fred D. Jr. & Paul, Jeffrey, eds. (2008). Objectivism, Subjectivism, and Relativism in Ethics. New York: Cambridge University Press. ISBN 978-0-521-71963-6. OCLC 177062528.
- Peikoff, Leonard (1982). The Ominous Parallels: The End of Freedom in America. New York: Stein & Day. ISBN 0-8128-2850-X. OCLC 8172185.
- ——————— (1991). Objectivism: The Philosophy of Ayn Rand. New York: Dutton. ISBN 0-525-93380-8. OCLC 23647748.
- ——————— (2012). The DIM Hypothesis: Why the Lights of the West Are Going Out. New York: New American Library. ISBN 978-0-451-23481-0. OCLC 775418851.
- Peikoff, Leonard (2012). S. Berliner, Michael (ed.). Understanding Objectivism: A Guide to Learning Ayn Rand's Philosophy. New York: New American Library. ISBN 978-0451236296. OCLC 860770765.
- Peikoff, Leonard; Wood, Barry (2013). Objective Communication: Writing, Speaking and Arguing. New York: New American Library. ISBN 978-0451418159. OCLC 837144730.
- Peikoff, Leonard; Trollop, Marlene (2014). Teaching Johnny to Think: A Philosophy of Education Based on the Principles of Ayn Rand's Objectivism. Ayn Rand Institute Press. ISBN 978-0979466168. OCLC 879490675.
- Plasil, Ellen (1985). Therapist. New York: St. Martin's/Marek. ISBN 0-312-79912-8. OCLC 11725819.
- Podritske, Marlene & Schwartz, Peter, eds. (2009). Objectively Speaking: Ayn Rand Interviewed. Lanham, Maryland: Lexington Books. ISBN 978-0-7391-3195-4. OCLC 267048088.
- Raimondo, Justin (1993). Reclaiming the American Right: The Lost Legacy of the Conservative Movement. Burlingame, California: Center for Libertarian Studies. ISBN 1-883959-00-4. OCLC 30055223.
- Robbins, John W. (1997). Without a Prayer: Ayn Rand and the Close of Her System. Hobbs, New Mexico: Trinity Foundation. ISBN 0-940931-50-8. OCLC 37185367. Revised and retitled edition of a 1974 book, originally titled Answer to Ayn Rand.
- Reisman, George (1996). Capitalism: A Treatise on Economics (PDF). Ottawa, Illinois: Jameson Books. ISBN 0-915463-73-3.
- Sciabarra, Chris Matthew (1995). Ayn Rand: The Russian Radical. University Park, Pennsylvania: Pennsylvania State University Press. ISBN 0-271-01440-7. OCLC 31133644.
- ——————————— (2003). Ayn Rand, Homosexuality, and Human Liberation. Cape Town, South Africa: Leap Publishing. ISBN 0-9584573-3-6. OCLC 55972360.
- Seddon, Fred (2003). Ayn Rand, Objectivists, and the History of Philosophy. Lanham, Maryland: University Press of America. ISBN 0-7618-2308-5. OCLC 51969016.
- Simpson, Brian (2005). Markets Don't Fail!. Lanham, Maryland: Lexington Books. ISBN 0-7391-1034-9. OCLC 57579337.
- Smith, George H. (1991). Atheism, Ayn Rand, and Other Heresies. Buffalo, New York: Prometheus Books. ISBN 0-87975-577-6. OCLC 22593041.
- Smith, Tara (1997). Moral Rights and Political Freedom. Lanham, Maryland: Rowman & Littlefield. ISBN 0-8476-8026-6. OCLC 31710378.
- ————— (2000). Viable Values: A Study of Life as the Root and Reward of Morality. Lanham, Maryland: Rowman & Littlefield. ISBN 0-8476-9760-6. OCLC 42397381.
- ————— (2006). Ayn Rand's Normative Ethics: The Virtuous Egoist. New York: Cambridge University Press. ISBN 0-521-86050-4. OCLC 60971741.
- Torres, Louis & Kamhi, Michelle Marder (2000). What Art Is: The Esthetic Theory of Ayn Rand. Chicago: Open Court Publishing. ISBN 0-8126-9372-8. OCLC 43787446.
- Touchstone, Kathleen (2006). Then Athena Said: Unilateral Transfers and the Transformation of Objectivist Ethics. Lanham, Maryland: University Press of America. ISBN 0-7618-3519-9. OCLC 70783649.
- Wortham, Anne (1981). The Other Side of Racism: A Philosophical Study of Black Race Consciousness. Columbus, Ohio: Ohio State University Press. ISBN 0-8142-0318-3. OCLC 6917587.
- Younkins, Edward W. (2005). Philosophers of Capitalism: Menger, Mises, Rand, and Beyond. Lanham, Maryland: Lexington Books. ISBN 0-7391-1076-4. OCLC 59147844.
- ————————— (2007). Champions of a Free Society: Ideas of Capitalism's Philosophers and Economists. Lanham, Maryland: Lexington Books. ISBN 978-0-7391-2647-9. OCLC 228676591.
- ————————— (2011). Flourishing and Happiness in a Free Society: Toward a Synthesis of Aristotelianism, Austrian Economics, and Ayn Rand's Objectivism. Lanham, Maryland: University Press of America. ISBN 978-0-7618-5529-3. OCLC 742512150.

=== Biography and literary analysis ===
The books below focus on Ayn Rand's life or her literary works.

- Baker, James T. (1987). Ayn Rand. Boston, Massachusetts: Twayne Publishers. ISBN 0-8057-7497-1. OCLC 14933003.
- Branden, Barbara (1986). The Passion of Ayn Rand. Garden City, New York: Doubleday & Company. ISBN 0-385-19171-5. OCLC 12614728.
- Branden, Nathaniel (1999). My Years with Ayn Rand. San Francisco: Jossey Bass. ISBN 0-7879-4513-7. OCLC 39391081. Revised and retitled edition of a 1989 book, originally titled Judgment Day.
- Branden, Nathaniel & Branden, Barbara (1962). Who Is Ayn Rand?. New York: Random House. ISBN 0-394-45179-1. OCLC 313377536.
- Britting, Jeff (2004). Ayn Rand. Overlook Illustrated Lives. New York: Overlook Duckworth. ISBN 1-58567-406-0. OCLC 56413971.
- Burns, Jennifer (2009). Goddess of the Market: Ayn Rand and the American Right. New York: Oxford University Press. ISBN 978-0-19-532487-7. OCLC 313665028.
- Den Uyl, Douglas J. (1999). The Fountainhead: An American Novel. Twayne's Masterwork Studies series. New York: Twayne Publishers. ISBN 0-8057-7932-9. OCLC 40193752.
- Doherty, Brian (2007). Radicals for Capitalism: A Freewheeling History of the Modern American Libertarian Movement. New York: Public Affairs. ISBN 978-1-58648-350-0. OCLC 76141517.
- Duggan, Lisa (2019). Mean Girl: Ayn Rand and the Culture of Greed. American Studies Now: Critical Histories of the Present. Oakland, California: University of California Press. ISBN 978-0520294769.
- Gladstein, Mimi Reisel (1999). The New Ayn Rand Companion. Westport, Connecticut: Greenwood Press. ISBN 0-313-30321-5. OCLC 40359365. Revised and retitled edition of a 1984 book, originally titled The Ayn Rand Companion.
- —————————— (2000). Atlas Shrugged: Manifesto of the Mind. Twayne's Masterwork Studies series. New York: Twayne Publishers. ISBN 0-8057-1638-6. OCLC 43569158.
- —————————— (2009). Ayn Rand. Major Conservative and Libertarian Thinkers series. New York: Continuum. ISBN 978-0-8264-4513-1. OCLC 319595162.
- Heller, Anne C. (2009). Ayn Rand and the World She Made. New York: Doubleday. ISBN 978-0-385-51399-9. OCLC 229027437.
- Holzer, Erika (2005). Ayn Rand: My Fiction Writing Teacher. Indio, California: Madison Press. ISBN 0-615-13041-0. OCLC 70662150.
- Johnson, Donald Leslie (2005). The Fountainheads: Wright, Rand, the FBI and Hollywood. Jefferson, North Carolina: McFarland & Company. ISBN 0-7864-1958-X. OCLC 56617298.
- Mayhew, Robert (2005). Ayn Rand and Song of Russia: Communism and Anti-Communism in 1940s Hollywood. Lanham, Maryland: The Scarecrow Press. ISBN 0-8108-5276-4. OCLC 55474309.
- ———————, ed. (2005). Essays on Ayn Rand's Anthem. Lanham, Maryland: Lexington Books. ISBN 0-7391-1030-6. OCLC 57577415.
- ———————, ed. (2006). Essays on Ayn Rand's The Fountainhead. Lanham, Maryland: Lexington Books. ISBN 0-7391-1577-4. OCLC 70707828.
- ———————, ed. (2009). Essays on Ayn Rand's Atlas Shrugged. Lanham, Maryland: Lexington Books. ISBN 978-0-7391-2779-7. OCLC 315237945.
- ———————, ed. (2012). Essays on Ayn Rand's We the Living (2nd ed.). Lanham, Maryland: Lexington Books. ISBN 978-0-7391-4969-0. OCLC 769323240.
- McConnell, Scott (2010). 100 Voices: An Oral History of Ayn Rand. New York: New American Library. ISBN 978-0-451-23130-7. OCLC 555642813.
- Paxton, Michael (1998). Ayn Rand: A Sense of Life (The Companion Book). Layton, Utah: Gibbs Smith. ISBN 0-87905-845-5. OCLC 38048196.
- Perinn, Vincent L. (1990). Ayn Rand: First Descriptive Bibliography. Rockville, Maryland: Quill & Brush. ISBN 0-9610494-8-0. OCLC 23216055.
- Sures, Mary Ann & Sures, Charles (2001). Facets of Ayn Rand. Los Angeles: Ayn Rand Institute Press. ISBN 0-9625336-5-3. OCLC 49870130.
- Thomas, William, ed. (2005). The Literary Art of Ayn Rand. Poughkeepsie, New York: The Objectivist Center. ISBN 1-57724-070-7.
- Valliant, James S. (2005). The Passion of Ayn Rand's Critics. Dallas, Texas: Durban House. ISBN 1-930754-67-1. OCLC 60644506.
- Vilgotsky, Anton (2015). Who is Ayn Rand? (Кто такая Айн Рэнд?). Moscow, Russia: AST. ISBN 978-5-17-088264-9.
- Walker, Jeff (1999). The Ayn Rand Cult. La Salle, Illinois: Open Court Publishing. ISBN 0-8126-9390-6. OCLC 39914039.
- Weiss, Gary (2012). Ayn Rand Nation: The Hidden Struggle for America's Soul. New York: St. Martin's Press. ISBN 978-0-312-59073-4. OCLC 740628885.
- Younkins, Edward W., ed. (2007). Ayn Rand's Atlas Shrugged: A Philosophical and Literary Companion. Burlington, Vermont: Ashgate Publishing. ISBN 978-0-7546-5533-6. OCLC 69792104.

== Other works about Rand or Objectivism ==
The works listed below include articles, pamphlets, individual chapters of books, and materials in non-print media. Articles reproduced in books listed above are not included on this list.

- Aune, James Arnt (2001). "Checking Ayn Rand's Premises (or, The Revenge of the Nerds)". Selling the Free Market: The Rhetoric of Economic Correctness. New York: Guilford Press. ISBN 1-57230-598-3.
- Barry, Norman P. (1987). "Ayn Rand and Egoism". On Classical Liberalism and Libertarianism. New York: St. Martin's Press. ISBN 0-312-00243-2. OCLC 14134854.
- Branden, Nathaniel (Fall 1984). "The Benefits and Hazards of the Philosophy of Ayn Rand: A Personal Statement". Journal of Humanistic Psychology. 24 (4): 39–64. doi:10.1177/0022167884244004. S2CID 144772216. Archived from the original on July 22, 2009.
- Cox, Stephen (Winter 1986). "Ayn Rand: Theory versus Creative Life" (PDF). Journal of Libertarian Studies. 8 (1): 19–29.
- Den Uyl, Douglas & Rasmussen, Douglas (April 1978). "Nozick On the Randian Argument". The Personalist. 59: 184–205.
- Efron, Robert (Autumn 1967). "Biology Without Consciousness – And Its Consequences". Perspectives in Biology and Medicine. 2 (1).
- Forman, Frank (1989). "Ayn Rand and Natural Rights". The Metaphysics of Liberty. Theory and Decision Library, Series A. New York: Kluwer Academic Publishers. ISBN 0-7923-0080-7.
- Gordon, Philip (Autumn 1977). "The Extroflective Hero: A Look at Ayn Rand". Journal of Popular Culture. 10 (4): 701–10. doi:10.1111/j.0022-3840.1977.1004_701.x.
- Hessen, Robert (1999). "Objectivist, 1962–1976". In Lora, Ronald & Henry, William Longton (eds.). The Conservative Press in Twentieth-Century America. Westport, Connecticut: Greenwood Publishing Group. pp. 349–56. ISBN 0-313-21390-9. OCLC 40481045.
- Hicks, Stephen (Winter 2003). "Ayn Rand and Contemporary Business Ethics" (PDF). Journal of Accounting, Ethics & Public Policy. 3 (1): 1–26. Based on a lecture given to the Ayn Rand Society at the American Philosophical Association on December 29, 1995.
- Hospers, John:
  - "Memories of Ayn Rand"
  - "Conversations With Ayn Rand" Part 1 by John Hospers (Originally published in Liberty, 1987)
  - Part 2 (Originally published in Liberty, 1987)
- Kelley, David (1996). Unrugged Individualism: The Selfish Basis of Benevolence. Poughkeepsie, NY: The Objectivist Center. ISBN 1-57724-000-6.
- —————— (1999). A Theory of Abstraction. Poughkeepsie, NY: The Objectivist Center. ISBN 1-57724-062-6.
- —————— (2008). "Objectivism". The Encyclopedia of Libertarianism. Thousand Oaks, CA: SAGE; Cato Institute. pp. 363–64. doi:10.4135/9781412965811.n221. ISBN 978-1-4129-6580-4. LCCN 2008009151. OCLC 750831024.
- Machan, Tibor (April 1977). "Nozick and Rand on Property Rights". The Personalist. 58: 192–95.
- Nozick, Robert (Spring 1971). "On the Randian Argument". The Personalist. 52: 282–304. Reprinted in Nozick, Socratic Puzzles, 1997, ISBN 0-674-81653-6.
- O'Neil, Patrick M. (Spring 1983). "Ayn Rand and the Is–Ought Problem" (PDF). Journal of Libertarian Studies. 7 (1): 81–99.
- Rasmussen, Douglas (1982). "Essentialism, Values and Rights: The Objectivist Case for the Free Society". In Machan, Tibor R. (ed.). The Libertarian Reader. Totowa, New Jersey: Rowman & Littlefield. ISBN 0-8476-7061-9.
- Menaul, Christopher, director (1998) The Passion of Ayn Rand. (Dramatisation of Barbara Branden's The Passion of Ayn Rand; released as a motion picture in 1999; leading players: Helen Mirren, Eric Stoltz, Peter Fonda)
- Sciabarra, Chris Matthew (1996). Ayn Rand: Her Life and Thought. Poughkeepsie, NY: The Atlas Society. ISBN 1-57724-031-6.
- ——————————— (Fall 1998). "A Renaissance in Rand Scholarship" (PDF). Reason Papers. 23: 132–59.
- ——————————— (2008). "Rand, Ayn (1905–1982)". The Encyclopedia of Libertarianism. Thousand Oaks, CA: SAGE; Cato Institute. pp. 412–15. doi:10.4135/9781412965811.n254. ISBN 978-1-4129-6580-4. LCCN 2008009151. OCLC 750831024.
- Smith, George H. (2000). "Belief and Knowledge: Ayn Rand's Theory of Knowledge". Why Atheism?. Buffalo, NY: Prometheus Books. ISBN 1-57392-268-4.
- Stockton, Sharon (2006). "Engineering Fascism: Ayn Rand, Ezra Pound and the Virile Hero". The Economics of Fantasy: Rape in Twentieth-century Literature. Columbus, Ohio: Ohio State University Press Press. pp. 48–70. ISBN 0-8142-1018-X.
- Thomas, William (2003). "Ayn Rand: Radical for Capitalism". In Frost, Bryan-Paul & Sikkenga, Jeffrey (eds.). History of American Political Thought. Lanham, Maryland: Lexington Books. ISBN 0-7391-0623-6.

== Objectivist periodicals ==
- The Intellectual Activist (1979–2010). Peter Schwartz editor (1979–1991), Robert Stubblefield editor (1991–1996), Robert Tracinski editor (1996–2010). Published fortnightly to September 1991; then bi-monthly to November 1998; monthly thereafter.
- The Objectivist Forum. Vols 1–8, 1980–1987. Harry Binswanger, editor and publisher; Leonard Peikoff, consulting editor. Published bi-monthly.
- Full Context. Vols 1–13, 1988–2000. Karen (Reedstrom) Minto, editor. Published monthly to June 1998; bi-monthly thereafter.
- Objectivity. Vols 1–2, 1990–1998. Stephen C. Boydstun, editor. Published occasionally.
- The Journal of Ayn Rand Studies (1999–2023). R.W. Bradford (until his death in 2005), Stephen D. Cox, Roderick Long (replacing Bradford), and Chris Matthew Sciabarra, editors. Published semi-annually.
- The Undercurrent (2005– ). Various student editors. Published occasionally.
- The Objective Standard (2006– ). Craig Biddle, editor and publisher. Published quarterly.
