= Objectivist movement =

Movement of individuals who seek to study and advance Objectivism

The Objectivist movement is a movement of individuals who seek to study and advance Objectivism, the philosophy expounded by novelist-philosopher Ayn Rand. The movement began informally in the 1950s and consisted of students who were brought together by their mutual interest in Rand's novel The Fountainhead. The group, ironically named "The Collective" due to their actual advocacy of individualism, in part consisted of Leonard Peikoff, Nathaniel Branden, Barbara Branden, Alan Greenspan, and Allan Blumenthal. Nathaniel Branden, a young Canadian student who had been greatly inspired by The Fountainhead, became a close confidant and encouraged Rand to expand her philosophy into a formal movement. From this informal beginning in Rand's living room, the movement expanded into a collection of think tanks, academic organizations, and periodicals.

Rand described Objectivism as "the concept of man as a heroic being, with his own happiness as the moral purpose of his life, with productive achievement as his noblest activity, and reason as his only absolute". Objectivism's main tenets are: that reality exists independently of consciousness; direct realism, that human beings have direct and inerrant cognitive contact with reality through sense perception; that one can attain objective conceptual knowledge based on perception by using the process of concept formation and inductive logic; rational egoism, that the moral purpose of one's life is the achievement of one's own happiness through productive work; that the only social system consistent with this morality is one that displays full respect for individual rights embodied in laissez-faire capitalism; and that art is "a selective re-creation of reality according to an artist's metaphysical value-judgments."

== History ==
=== The Collective ===
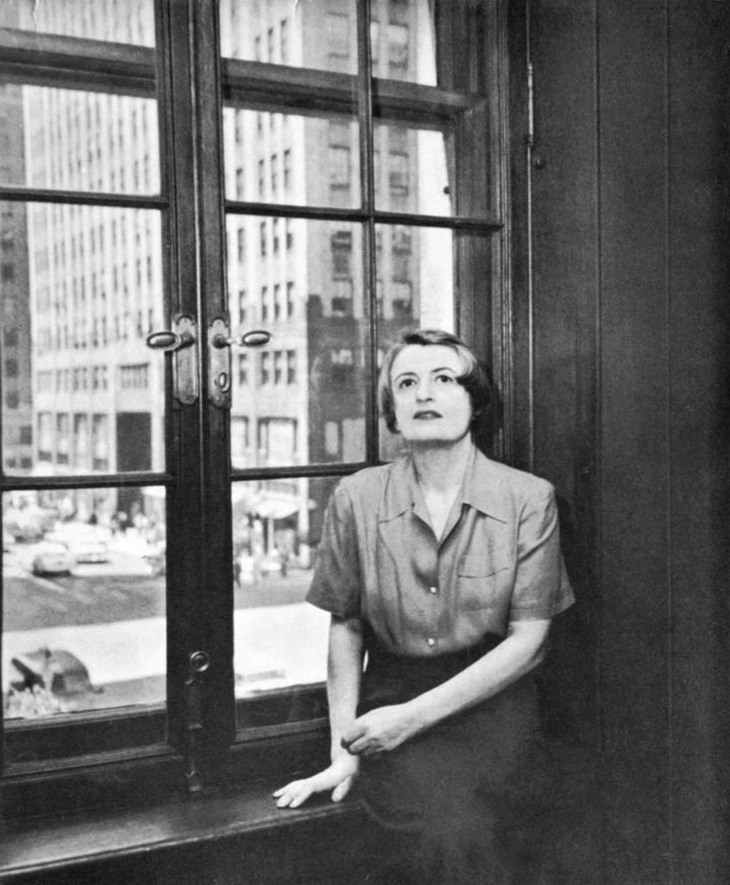
Ayn Rand in 1957

"The Collective" was Rand's private, humorous name for a group of close confidants, students, and proponents of Rand and Objectivism during the 1950s and 1960s. The founding members of the group were Nathaniel Branden, Barbara Branden, Leonard Peikoff, Alan Greenspan, Joan Kennedy Taylor, Allan Blumenthal, Harry Kalberman, Elayne Kalberman, Joan Mitchell, and Mary Ann Sures (formerly Rukavina). This group became the nucleus of a growing movement of Rand admirers whose name was chosen by Rand as a joke based on Objectivism's staunch commitment to individualism and strong objection to all forms of Collectivism.

The Collective originally started out as an informal gathering of friends (many of them related to one another) who met with Rand on weekends at her apartment on East 36th Street in New York City to discuss philosophy. Barbara Branden said the group met "because of a common interest in ideas". Greenspan recalled being drawn to Rand because of a shared belief in "the importance of mathematics and intellectual rigor". The group met at Rand's apartment at least once a week, and would often discuss and debate into the early morning hours. About these discussions, Greenspan said, "Talking to Ayn Rand was like starting a game of chess thinking I was good, and suddenly finding myself in checkmate." Eventually, Rand also allowed them to begin reading the manuscript of Atlas Shrugged (1957) as she completed it. The Collective began to play a larger, more formal role, promoting Rand's philosophy through the Nathaniel Branden Institute (NBI). Some Collective members gave lectures at the NBI in cities across the United States and wrote articles for its newsletters, The Objectivist Newsletter (1962–1965) and The Objectivist (1966–1971).

=== Nathaniel Branden Institute ===
The first formal presentation of Objectivism began with the Nathaniel Branden Lectures (NBL), shortly after the publication of Rand's final novel, Atlas Shrugged. Nathaniel Branden was the first member of The Collective, and later, Rand's "intellectual heir". In time, Branden and Rand became romantically involved. After the publication of Atlas Shrugged, Rand was inundated with requests for more information about her philosophy. Not wanting to be a teacher or leader of an organized movement, she allowed Branden to lecture on her behalf.

Timeline of the Objectivist movement
Year
Event

1943
1950
1957
1958
1961
1968
1971
1980
1982
1985
1987
1989
1990
1999
2000
2001

The Fountainhead published
Branden meets Rand
Atlas Shrugged published
NBI created
Objectivist Newsletter starts
Branden-Rand split
Ayn Rand Letter starts
Objectivist Forum starts
Rand's death
Ayn Rand Institute starts
Ayn Rand Society forms
Peikoff-Kelley split
IOS starts
JARS founded
Objectivist Academic Center
First Anthem Foundation fellowship

The success of NBL prompted Branden to expand his lecture organization into the Nathaniel Branden Institute (NBI). Rand and Branden also co-founded the first publication devoted to the study and application of Objectivism. The Objectivist Newsletter began publication in 1962 and was later expanded into The Objectivist.

The 1960s saw a rapid expansion of the Objectivist movement. Rand was a frequent lecturer at universities across the country. Rand hosted a radio program on Objectivism on the Columbia University station, WKCR-FM. The Nathaniel Branden Institute (NBI) hosted lectures on Objectivism, the history of philosophy, art, and psychology in cities across the country. Campus clubs devoted to studying Rand's philosophy formed throughout the country, though operated independently of NBI. Rand was a frequent guest on radio and television, as well as an annual lecturer at the Ford Hall Forum. At the peak of its popularity, NBI was delivering taped lectures in over 80 cities. By 1967 NBI had leased an entire floor in the Empire State Building (with The Objectivist as a sub-tenant).

In 1968, Rand publicly broke with Nathaniel and Barbara Branden. She accused Nathaniel Branden of a "gradual departure from the principles of Objectivism", financial exploitation of her related to business loans, and "deliberate deception of several persons". In a response sent to the mailing list of The Objectivist in 1968, the Brandens denied many of Rand's charges against them. The result of their conflicting claims was a "schism", as some participants in the Objectivist movement supported the Brandens, while others supported Rand's repudiation of them.

NBI was closed and its offices vacated, in an environment that Barbara Branden described as "total hysteria" as its former students learned about the matter. The Brandens continued for a time to sell some of NBI's recorded lectures through a new company, but otherwise had little involvement with the Objectivist movement until their biographical books about Rand were released. The Objectivist continued publishing with Rand as editor and Leonard Peikoff as associate editor. Peikoff also took over Nathaniel Branden's role as the primary lecturer on Objectivism. Peikoff later described the Brandens' expulsion as the first "of the many schisms that have plagued the Objectivist movement."

=== 1970s ===
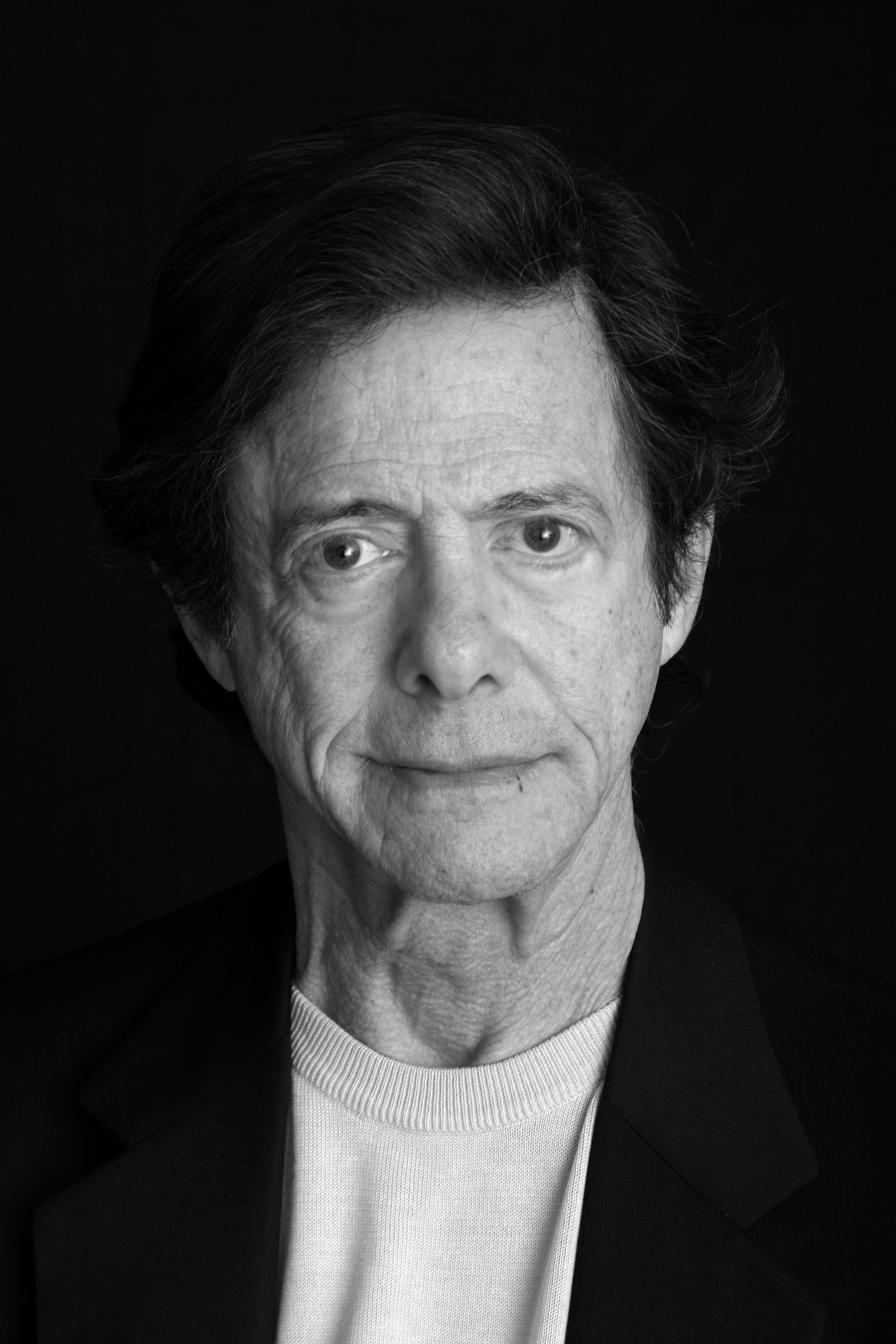
Leonard Peikoff delivered lectures on Objectivism throughout the 1970s.

In the 1970s, Rand gave fewer public speeches. She concentrated instead on nonfiction writing and on helping the work of her students and associates, through efforts such as a series of private workshops on epistemology that she conducted from 1969 through 1971 for about a dozen students and professionals in philosophy, math and physics. The Objectivist was replaced by The Ayn Rand Letter in 1971. While The Objectivist had published articles by many authors, The Ayn Rand Letter, marketed as a personal newsletter from Rand, published only her work (plus occasionally Leonard Peikoff's).

Throughout the decade, Peikoff continued to offer a number of lecture series on various topics related to Objectivism to large audiences, often incorporating new philosophic material. Rand worked closely with Peikoff, helping edit his book, The Ominous Parallels, for which she wrote the introduction. In mid-1979, Peter Schwartz began editing and publishing The Intellectual Activist, a publication which Rand recommended to her audience. One of Rand's associates, philosopher Harry Binswanger, pitched to Rand his idea for a mini-encyclopedia of Objectivism, The Ayn Rand Lexicon: Objectivism from A to Z (1986), and she approved of the project after seeing a sample of the proposed selections. Rand advised him on standards of inclusion but died before the work was completed. After the close of The Objectivist Calendar, a short publication listing upcoming events within the Objectivist movement, Binswanger began editing and publishing The Objectivist Forum, a bimonthly journal on Objectivism which had Rand's support and for which she served as "Philosophic Consultant".

=== 1980s ===
Upon Rand's death on March 6, 1982, Peikoff inherited her estate, including the control of the copyrights to her books and writing (barring Anthem, which is in the public domain). Shortly after Rand's death, Peikoff's first book, The Ominous Parallels, was published. In 1983, Peikoff gave a series of lectures titled Understanding Objectivism, for the purpose of improving the methodology used in studying Objectivism, as a corrective to what he describes as the "Rationalist" and the "Empiricist" methods of thought.

In 1985, Leonard Peikoff and Ed Snider founded the Ayn Rand Institute (ARI), the first organization devoted to the study and advocacy of Objectivism since the closure of NBI in 1968. The institute began by sponsoring essay contests on Rand's novels and distributing op-eds analyzing world events from an Objectivist perspective. In 1987, the institute began teaching aspiring Objectivist academics.

=== Peikoff–Kelley split ===
In 1989, another major split occurred within the Objectivist movement. Peter Schwartz criticized David Kelley, a philosopher and lecturer then affiliated with ARI, for giving a speech under the auspices of Laissez Faire Books (LFB), a libertarian bookseller. Schwartz argued that this activity violated the Objectivist moral principle of sanction. In other words, Kelley was implicitly conferring moral approval on the organization by appearing at an event that it sponsored. LFB, in turn, was morally objectionable because it promoted books, such as The Passion of Ayn Rand (1986), that Schwartz maintained were hostile and defamatory towards Rand and Objectivism as well as being the world's center for literature promoting anarchism, which Rand condemned as "childish" and subjectivist. (Although Schwartz made no mention of it, Leonard Peikoff had signed copies of his book The Ominous Parallels at three LFB events in 1982. According to Peikoff, he later broke off relations with LFB after being told that LFB offered anarchist literature.)

Kelley responded, in a paper titled "A Question of Sanction", by disputing Schwartz's interpretation of the sanction principle in particular and his interpretation of moral principles in general. Subsequently, in an essay appearing in The Intellectual Activist, Peikoff endorsed Schwartz's view and claimed that Kelley's arguments contradicted the fundamental principles of Objectivism. Peikoff maintained that many non-Objectivist systems of thought, such as Marxism, are based on "inherently dishonest ideas" whose advocacy must never be sanctioned. He attributed the fall of NBI and subsequent schisms not to "differences in regard to love affairs or political strategy or proselytizing techniques or anybody's personality", but to a "fundamental and philosophical" cause: "If you grasp and accept the concept of 'objectivity,' in all its implications, then you accept Objectivism, you live by it and you revere Ayn Rand for defining it. If you fail fully to grasp and accept the concept, whether your failure is deliberate or otherwise, you eventually drift away from Ayn Rand's orbit, or rewrite her viewpoint or turn openly into her enemy." Those who criticized his position were to make their exit: "If you agree with the Branden or Kelley viewpoint or anything resembling it—please drop out of our movement: drop Ayn Rand, leave Objectivism alone. We do not want you and Ayn Rand would not have wanted you [...]"

Kelley responded to the Peikoff–Schwartz critique in his monograph, Truth and Toleration, later updated as The Contested Legacy of Ayn Rand. He responded to his ostracism by founding the Institute for Objectivist Studies (IOS), later renamed The Objectivist Center (TOC) and then The Atlas Society (TAS), with the help of Ed Snider, one of the founders of the Ayn Rand Institute. Kelley was joined by Objectivist scholars George Walsh and Jim Lennox, as well as former Collective members Joan and Allan Blumenthal.

=== 1990s ===
Kelley's Institute for Objectivist Studies (IOS) began to publish material on Objectivism and host conferences for Rand scholars in 1990. IOS held a symposium on Chris Matthew Sciabarra's book, Ayn Rand: The Russian Radical. IOS invited Nathaniel and Barbara Branden to participate in the institute's activities, effectively bringing them back into the Objectivist movement, and they continued to appear at events for the organization until their deaths in 2014 and 2013, respectively. In 1999, IOS renamed itself to The Objectivist Center.

In 1991, Peikoff's book Objectivism: The Philosophy of Ayn Rand was published. It was the first comprehensive presentation of Rand's philosophy to appear in print. In 1994, the Ayn Rand Institute expanded its educational programs into the Objectivist Graduate Center (OGC), which held classes led by Peikoff, Binswanger, and Schwartz. In 1996, ARI intellectuals delivered a series of lectures on Objectivism at Harvard. ARI increased its notoriety by staging a protest against President Clinton's volunteerism initiative in 1997. ARI gathered more attention for its activism on behalf of the family of Elian Gonzalez. The Academy Award-nominated documentary Ayn Rand: A Sense of Life, directed by Michael Paxton, was released in 1996.

=== 2000s ===
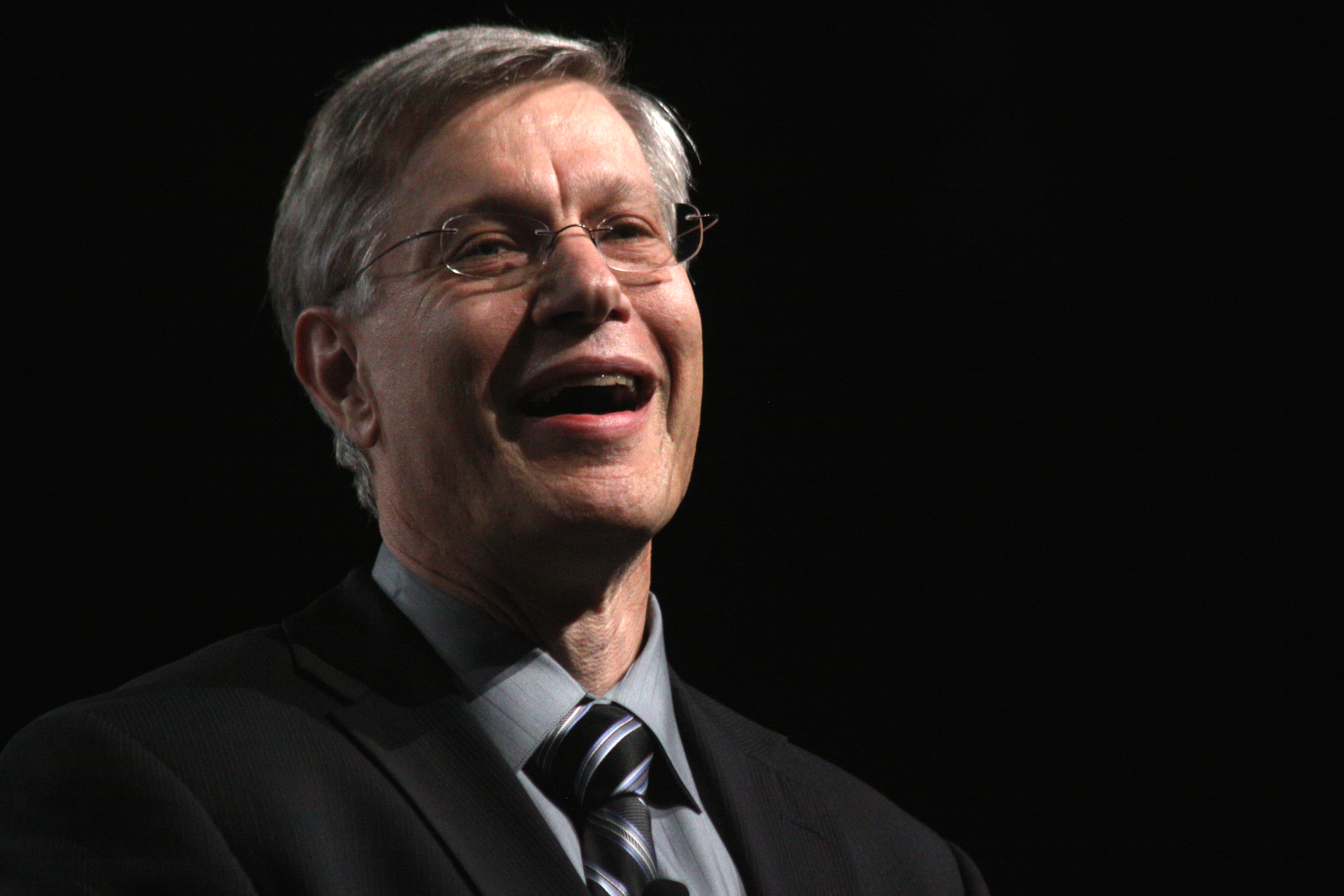
Yaron Brook was executive director of ARI from 2000 to 2017.

In 2000, Yaron Brook succeeded Michael Berliner as head of ARI, and ARI expanded its OGC into the Objectivist Academic Center (OAC), offering undergraduate and graduate courses on Objectivism, writing, history, the history of philosophy, and the history of science. Several OAC classes are now accredited. Throughout the 2000s, ARI increased its media presence, publishing op-eds and providing intellectuals for live interviews. In 2005, ARI helped establish the Ayn Rand Institute Canada, which distributes free books to Canadian schools. In 2006, ARI sponsored a conference on the war on terror. In addition to Objectivist speakers, mid-east scholars Daniel Pipes, Robert Spencer, and Danish newspaper editor Flemming Rose gave lectures. By 2007, ARI had donated 700,000 copies of Rand's novels to high schools around the United States.

The Objectivist Center also went through a number of changes in the 2000s. In 2005, founder David Kelley stepped aside as executive director in favor of former Cato Institute scholar Ed Hudgins, while Kelley stayed on as Chief Intellectual Officer, and the institute relocated to Washington, D.C. In 2006, the organization rebranded itself again, changing its name to The Atlas Society.

In 2009, Domingo García founded Objetivismo Internacional (OI) in Spain to help spread Objectivism in the Spanish-speaking world. OI is not officially affiliated with any other Objectivist organization; however, they closely collaborate with the Ayn Rand Institute. OI is based in Murcia, Spain, and García is its CEO.

=== 2010s ===
A central goal for ARI throughout the 2010s has been to spread Objectivism internationally. ARI helped establish the Ayn Rand Center Israel in October 2012, the Ayn Rand Institute Europe in April 2015, and the Ayn Rand Center Japan in February 2017. Each of these institutions are affiliated with ARI but are separate legal entities. In 2017, Jim Brown replaced Yaron Brook as the operational executive of ARI, while Brook continues as its chairman of the board. In June 2018, Tal Tsfany, co-founder of the Ayn Rand Center Israel, took over as the president and CEO of ARI.

In 2014, Carl Barney launched the Objectivist Venture Fund, originally the Anthem Venture Fund, which has helped fund a number of Objectivist initiatives, including The Undercurrent and the Ayn Rand Center Israel.

In 2016, the Ayn Rand Center Israel launched the Atlas Award for the Best Israeli Start-up, presented annually at the Tel Aviv Stock Exchange. Judges for the award include Yaron Brook and Shlomo Kalish. Moovit was the first recipient of the award in 2016. Zebra Medical Vision won the award in 2017, and Innoviz won in 2018.

In 2016, Objetivismo USA was established as a 501(c)(3) nonprofit organization in New York, New York as a sister organization of Objetivismo Internacional. Its CEO is Edwin Thompson.

The Atlas Society has also undergone a change in leadership in the 2010s. In 2011, Aaron Day replaced Ed Hudgins as the operational executive of The Atlas Society, and on March 1, 2016, The Atlas Society announced Jennifer Grossman as its new CEO.

=== 2020s ===
In the 2020s, the major Objectivist organizations shifted their focus toward digital media and online education. Under the continued leadership of CEO Tal Tsfany, the Ayn Rand Institute (ARI) rebranded its educational programs as "Ayn Rand University" (ARU), aiming to provide a more formalized curriculum for students of Objectivism. ARI also expanded its online journal, New Ideal, which became a primary outlet for the institute's commentary on current events, including its opposition to government lockdowns during the COVID-19 pandemic.

The Atlas Society, led by CEO Jennifer Grossman, increasingly focused on reaching younger audiences through multimedia projects, including graphic novels and animated videos. The organization launched "The Atlas Society Asks," a weekly interview series featuring authors, entrepreneurs, and political commentators.

In academic publishing, The Journal of Ayn Rand Studies, a nonpartisan scholarly journal established in 1999, ceased publication in 2023 after twenty-four years of operation.

== Objectivism in academia ==
Despite the fact that several members of The Collective were philosophy graduate students at NYU, Objectivism did not begin to make serious inroads into academic philosophy until the 1980s. Rand herself had much disdain for modern academia, citing the poor state of American universities, particularly the humanities, as the source of much of the country's problems. Peikoff expressed similar sentiments in the early 1990s, declaring that his book on Objectivism was "written not for academics, but for human beings (including any academics who qualify)". The Ayn Rand Institute initially concentrated on promoting Objectivism independently of academia, supplying free books to high schools and universities, sponsoring essay contests for students and support programs for teachers and professors interested in studying and teaching Rand's ideas.

Some limited academic attention was given to Objectivism in the 1970s. In 1971, William F. O'Neill published With Charity Toward None: An Analysis of Ayn Rand's Philosophy, in which he provides an academic discussion of Objectivism. Although he alleges flaws in Rand's thinking, he expresses admiration for her efforts, and particularly her ability to motivate readers to think about philosophical issues. There was occasional discussion of Rand in scholarly journals throughout the rest of the decade.

Thirteen years later, the second book-length academic study of Objectivism appeared. It was a collection of essays called The Philosophic Thought of Ayn Rand (1984), edited by Douglas Den Uyl and Douglas Rasmussen. It was also the first book about Rand's thought to be published after her death. Den Uyl and Rasmussen made a specific effort to bring more serious scholarly attention to Objectivism by maintaining high scholarly standards for the essays in their book.

In 1987, noted Aristotle scholar and Rand student Allan Gotthelf co-founded the Ayn Rand Society with George Walsh and David Kelley, which is affiliated with the American Philosophical Association. Non-Objectivist participants have included Jaegwon Kim and Susan Haack.

In 1995, Chris Matthew Sciabarra published Ayn Rand: The Russian Radical, an academic study of Rand's ideas and intellectual history. Rand bibliographer Mimi Reisel Gladstein called Sciabarra's work "a significant milestone in Rand studies". Three years later, Sciabarra declared a "renaissance" in the scholarship about Rand, noting that his book was only "one of fifteen book titles dealing with Rand that have been published since 1995, along with countless articles and other references to her work". However, he also noted that not all of the material carried "deep scholarly interest".

In 2001, John P. McCaskey founded the Anthem Foundation for Objectivist Scholarship, which sponsors the work of professors affiliated with the Ayn Rand Institute. As of 2007 there were 13 such fellowships for the study of Objectivism in universities in the U.S., including at the University of Pittsburgh and the University of Texas at Austin. In 2006, the Anthem Foundation in conjunction with the University of Pittsburgh hosted a conference on the philosophy of science called "Concepts and Objectivity: Knowledge, Science, and Values". Participants included Objectivists Onkar Ghate, Allan Gotthelf, James G. Lennox, Harry Binswanger, and Tara Smith, as well as noted analytic philosophers David Sosa, A. P. Martinich, and Peter Railton. Other Objectivists, not all of whom are affiliated with ARI, have received support from the BB&T Charitable Foundation's program to support the study of capitalism. In 2010 McCaskey was forced to resign from the Ayn Rand Institute and subsequently resigned from the Anthem Foundation.

In 2006, Cambridge University Press published Tara Smith's book, Ayn Rand's Normative Ethics: The Virtuous Egoist.

Since 1999, The Journal of Ayn Rand Studies, edited by Stephen D. Cox, Chris Matthew Sciabarra, and R. W. Bradford (until his death in 2005), has been published semi-annually as a "nonpartisan", scholarly forum for the discussion of Rand's work and its application to many fields. The Journal is published by the Pennsylvania University Press and archived at Stanford University's CLOCKSS. None of its editors have been aligned with the Ayn Rand Institute, and no one affiliated with ARI has participated in its exchanges since 2002.

=== Student activism ===
Objectivism has remained popular on college campuses, with dozens of student groups dedicated to promoting and studying the philosophy of Objectivism spread across the U.S., Australia, Canada, Guatemala, Israel, the Netherlands, New Zealand, and Norway. These clubs often present speakers on controversial topics such as abortion, religion, and foreign policy, often allying with conservative (and sometimes liberal) organizations to organize their events. For example, the New York University Objectivism Club hosted a joint panel on the Muhammad cartoons that received nationwide coverage for NYU's censorship of the cartoons. There are several dozen speakers sponsored by the Ayn Rand Institute and other organizations who give nationwide tours each year speaking about Objectivism.

The Ayn Rand Institute has spent $5 million on educational programs advancing Objectivism, including scholarships and clubs. These clubs often obtain educational materials and speakers from ARI. There are also several conferences organized by various organizations, which draw several hundred attendees each summer and feature philosophy courses and presentations of new publications and research. A student-run magazine, The Undercurrent, is published for colleges around the United States.

== Influence ==
There are a number of writers who cannot be classified as Objectivist but who still exhibit a significant influence of Objectivism in their own work. Prominent among these is John Hospers, Emeritus Professor of Philosophy, University of Southern California, who credited Rand's political ideas as helping to shape his own, while in other areas sharp differences remained. Another is Murray Rothbard, who, like Rand, advocated volition, Aristotle and natural rights, but who also advocated anarchism, which was anathema to Rand. Also in this category are journalist Edith Efron, scientist Petr Beckmann, and author Charles Murray.

== Criticisms and responses ==
=== Criticisms ===
Over the years, some critics have accused the Objectivist movement of being a cult or cult-like, and Rand of being a cult figure. The term 'Randroid' (a portmanteau of 'Rand' and 'android') has been used to evoke the image of "the Galt-imitating robots produced by the cult".

Suggestions of cult-like behavior by Objectivists began during the NBI days. With growing media coverage, articles began appearing that referred to the "Cult of Ayn Rand" and compared her to various religious leaders. Terry Teachout described NBI as "a quasi-cult which revolved around the adoration of Ayn Rand and her fictional heroes", one that "disintegrated" when Rand split with Nathaniel Branden. In 1968, psychologist Albert Ellis, in the wake of a public debate with Nathaniel Branden, published a book arguing that Objectivism was a religion, whose practices included "sexual Puritanism", "absolutism", "damning and condemning", and "deification" of Ayn Rand and her fictional heroes. In his memoirs, Nathaniel Branden said of The Collective and NBI that "there was a cultish aspect to our world [...] We were a group organized around a charismatic leader, whose members judged one another's character chiefly by loyalty to that leader and her ideas."

In 1972, libertarian author Murray Rothbard began privately circulating an essay on "The Sociology of the Ayn Rand Cult", in which he wrote:

If the glaring inner contradictions of the Leninist cults make them intriguing objects of study, still more so is the Ayn Rand cult ... [f]or not only was the Rand cult explicitly atheist, anti-religious, and an extoller of Reason; it also promoted slavish dependence on the guru in the name of independence; adoration and obedience to the leader in the name of every person's individuality; and blind emotion and faith in the guru in the name of Reason.

Rothbard also wrote that "the guiding spirit of the Randian movement was not individual liberty ... but rather personal power for Ayn Rand and her leading disciples."

In the 1990s, Michael Shermer argued that the Objectivist movement displayed characteristics of religious cults such as the veneration and inerrancy of the leader; hidden agendas; financial and/or sexual exploitation; and the beliefs that the movement provides absolute truth and absolute morality. Shermer maintained that certain aspects of Objectivist epistemology and ethics promoted cult-like behavior:

[A]s soon as a group sets itself up to be the final moral arbiter of other people's actions, especially when its members believe they have discovered absolute standards of right and wrong, it is the beginning of the end of tolerance, and thus reason and rationality. It is this characteristic more than any other that makes a cult, a religion, a nation, or any other group, dangerous to individual freedom. Its absolutism was the biggest flaw in Ayn Rand's Objectivism, the unlikeliest cult in history.

In 1999, Jeff Walker published The Ayn Rand Cult. In one passage, Walker compared Objectivism to the Dianetics practices of Scientology, which is considered by many to be a cult. Both, argues Walker, are totalist sets of beliefs that advocate "an ethics for the masses based on survival as a rational being." Walker continues, "Dianetics used reasoning somewhat similar to Rand's about the brain as a machine. [...] Both have a higher mind reprogramming the rest of the mind." Walker further notes that both philosophies claim to be based on science and logic. Walker's book has drawn criticism from Rand scholars. Chris Matthew Sciabarra criticized Walker's objectivity and scholarship. Mimi Reisel Gladstein wrote that Walker's thesis is "questionable and often depends on innuendo, rather than logic." R. W. Bradford called it "merely annoying" for scholars.

The claims of cultism have continued in more recent years. In 2004, Thomas Szasz wrote in support of Rothbard's 1972 essay, and in 2006, Albert Ellis published an updated edition of his 1968 book that included favorable references to Walker's. Similarly, Walter Block, while expressing admiration for some of Rand's ideas and noting her strong influence on libertarianism, described the Objectivist movement as "a tiny imploding cult".

=== Responses ===
Rand stated that "I am not a cult", and said in 1961 that she did not want "blind followers". In the wake of NBI's collapse, she declared that she did not even want an organized movement.

Jim Peron responded to Shermer, Rothbard and others with an argument that similarities to cults are superficial at best and charges of cultism directed at Objectivists are ad hominem attacks. Objectivism, he said, lacks layers of initiation, a hierarchy, obligation, cost or physical coercion:

I cannot see how a disembodied philosophy can be a cult. I say Objectivism was disembodied because there was no Objectivist organization to join. The Nathaniel Branden Institute gave lectures, but had no membership. You could subscribe to a newsletter but you couldn't join. Objectivism was, and is, structureless. And without a structure there cannot be cult. [...] The vast majority of self-proclaimed Objectivists are people who read Rand's works and agreed with her. Most have never attended an Objectivist meeting nor subscribed to any Objectivist newsletter.

In 2001, Rand's long-time associate Mary Ann Sures remarked:

Some critics have tried to turn her certainty into a desire on her part to be an authority in the bad sense, and they accuse her of being dogmatic, of demanding unquestioning agreement and blind loyalty. They have tried, but none successfully, to make her into the leader of a cult, and followers of her philosophy into cultists who accept without thinking everything she says. This is a most unjust accusation; it's really perverse. Unquestioning agreement is precisely what Ayn Rand did not want. She wanted you to think and act independently, not to accept conclusions because she said so, but because you reached them by using your mind in an independent and firsthand manner.

Meanwhile, Shermer, who considers himself an admirer of Rand, has tempered his judgment. Contrasting Peikoff's "heavy-hammer approach" with the "big-tent approach" of The Atlas Society, Shermer told Ed Hudgins: "If we're close enough on the same page about many things, I think it's more useful to cut people some slack, rather than going after them on some smaller points. I don't see the advantage of saying, 'You shouldn't have liked that movie because ultimately, if you were an Objectivist, you wouldn't have.' I guess it was those sorts of judgments made by some Objectiv[ists] that I objected to."

== See also ==
- Bibliography of Ayn Rand and Objectivism
- Libertarianism
- Who is John Galt
- Objectivism and libertarianism
