= Letters of Ayn Rand =

1995 book collection of letters

- Cover of the first edition
- Editor: Michael S. Berliner
- Author: Ayn Rand
- Language: English
- Publisher: Dutton
- Publication date: 1995
- Publication place: United States
- Media type: Print
- Pages: 720 (hardcover)
- ISBN: 0-525-93946-6 (hardcover)
- OCLC: 31412028

Letters of Ayn Rand is a book derived from the letters of the Russian-born American writer and philosopher Ayn Rand. It was published in 1995, 13 years after Rand's death. It was edited by Michael Berliner with the approval of Rand's estate.

== Background ==
When Rand died in 1982, the materials in her estate included copies of over 2,000 letters written by her between 1926 and 1981. Berliner selected "approximately 35 to 40 percent of the total" for publication. He also edited the letters to remove "less interesting material", such as opening and closing statements or apologies by Rand for not writing someone sooner after they had written her. Discussing the letters in the context of a later controversy over the editing of Rand's published journals, historian Jennifer Burns affirmed that Berliner had only omitted material rather than changed the content.

The hardcover edition of Letters of Ayn Rand was published by Dutton in 1995. A paperback edition was published by Plume in 1997. An expanded, revised edition was published by Penguin Random House in 2025.

== Contents ==
The organization of the letters is largely chronological, but specific sections are dedicated to Rand's correspondence with Frank Lloyd Wright, Isabel Paterson and John Hospers. An appendix provides a form letter that Rand sent to many fans of The Fountainhead who had written her. Rand's heir, Leonard Peikoff, provides an introduction.

== Reception ==
At the time of its release, about a dozen publications reviewed Letters of Ayn Rand, according to the Ayn Rand Institute. The reviews were mixed.

In The New York Times Book Review, Christopher Cox, then a member of the United States House of Representatives, gave the book a positive review. He said Rand's letters were "an important part of Ayn Rand's intellectual contribution" that are "filled with flashes of emotional insight, surprising facts and unintended humor." This was the first positive review of one of Rand's books in The New York Times Book Review since 1943.

Another positive review came from Rand scholar Chris Matthew Sciabarra. Writing in Reason magazine, he predicted that Rand's letters would "delight and sometimes shock readers", and said "what is most startling about the collection is how well it humanizes Ayn Rand."

Liberty magazine editor R.W. Bradford found the book interesting and said it "allows the reader to see glimpses of the real woman and her development as a thinker and writer." However, he described Berliner's editing as "inept" and Peikoff's introduction as "uninformative". He said Rand wrote relatively few letters for a significant literary figure, and suggested Berliner held back potentially interesting letters for fear of upsetting Rand's "self-made myth," which Bradford considered "inexcusable".

In The Washington Post, Jeffrey Frank described the book as "ultimately tedious". He said her earlier letters are "considerably more interesting than the later ones", which include "an endless amount of whining about various publishers, her detailed responses to editors' suggestions, her hectoring assertions of her beliefs."

In National Review, Florence King said the "book reeks of the sycophancy that Miss Rand always inspired" and noted several letters attacking the National Review itself, "the magazine she loved to hate".

Objectivist magazines praised the book, with one saying, "in her letters we learn more of the style of her soul", while another called the book "the next best thing" to knowing Rand personally.

In a review for the Los Angeles Daily News, Scott Holleran called the book "a treasure chest" in which "Rand emerges as a passionate thinker".

Other reviews included a review by Claudia Roth Pierpont in The New Yorker, and reviews in Booklist, Choice, and the Richmond Times-Dispatch.

Rand scholars writing about the book some years later also expressed mixed opinions. Mimi Reisel Gladstein complimented the "uncommon variety of letters" included, saying it "allows the reader access to the many facets of Rand's private and public personae." However, she noted a mistake regarding Rand's birthday at the beginning of the book, and included it among several posthumous books approved by Rand's estate that "have not always exhibited a confidence-inspiring level of academic rigor." Jennifer Burns said scholars can use the material in the book, but indicated the material omitted by Berliner includes items "of high interest to the historian" so that "important insights can be gleaned only from the originals."

== See also ==
- Bibliography of Ayn Rand and Objectivism
