= Journals of Ayn Rand =

1997 collection of Ayn Rand's letters

- First edition cover
- Editor: David Harriman
- Author: Ayn Rand
- Language: English
- Publisher: Dutton
- Publication date: 1997
- Publication place: United States
- Media type: Print
- Pages: 727 (hardcover)
- ISBN: 0525943706 (hardcover)
- OCLC: 36566117
- Dewey Decimal: 818.5203 B
- LC Class: PS3535.A547

Journals of Ayn Rand is a book derived from the private journals of the Russian-born American writer and philosopher Ayn Rand. Edited by David Harriman with the approval of Rand's estate, it was published in 1997, 15 years after her death. Some reviewers considered it an interesting source of information for readers with an interest in Rand, but several scholars criticized Harriman's editing as being too heavy-handed and insufficiently acknowledged in the published text.

== Background ==
When Rand died in 1982, her private papers were left to her student and heir Leonard Peikoff. Starting in 1983, Peikoff began authorizing the publication of excerpts from her journals and other unpublished writings. From 1983 to 1994, several such excerpts appeared in The Objectivist Forum (Note: The excerpts published in The Objectivist Forum were: "Philosophic Journal" (August 1983) "Notes for Atlas Shrugged" (December 1983) "Notes for Atlas Shrugged" (April 1984) "Philosophic Notes" (August 1984) "Notes for The Fountainhead" (December 1984)) and The Intellectual Activist. (Note: The excerpts published in The Intellectual Activist were: "From Ayn Rand's Notes for Atlas Shrugged" (January 1992) "Notes on Scene in Roark's Apartment" (January 1993) "Notes on the Thomas Committee" (November 1993) "'Memory-Storing' Epistemology" (January 1994) "Ayn Rand's Journals: Selections from The Moral Basis of Individualism" (November 1995) "From Ayn Rand's Journals: Notes on The Fountainhead" (January and March 1997)) David Harriman, a physicist and a speaker for the Ayn Rand Institute, edited Rand's journals for publication in book form. The hardcover edition of the fully edited Journals of Ayn Rand was published by Dutton in 1997. A paperback edition was published by Plume in 1999.

== Contents ==
In a foreword for the book, Peikoff describes Rand's journals, with a few exceptions, as being "written for herself, for her own clarity" and not intended for publication. A preface by Harriman describes the material as being about three-quarters of Rand's "working journals", collected from "numerous boxes of papers she left behind at her death". He describes his editing as consisting of "selection, organization, line editing, and insertion of explanatory comments." He says that "not a great deal of line editing was required", and that his editorial insertions and "omissions of passages" are marked in the published text.

The majority of the book consists of Rand's edited journals, divided into five major sections. The first section, titled "Early Projects" includes scenarios for silent movies that Rand developed when she first moved to Hollywood in the 1920s. There are also notes and outlines for her first published novel, We the Living, and for another early novel that was never completed, to be entitled The Little Street. The Little Street was meant to center around protagonist Danny Renahan, who was based on real-life murderer and kidnapper William Hickman. In this first section, she also devotes her own thoughts to Hickman, romanticizing his words (“I am like the state: what is good for me is right.”) and detachment from others ("He does not understand, because he has no organ for understanding, the necessity, meaning or importance of other people.") as indicative of a "real man". Entries in an early "philosophic journal" from April and May 1934, are described by Rand as "the vague beginnings of an amateur philosopher."

The second section, titled "The Fountainhead", consists of material related to her novel of that name. She took extensive notes from her research on architecture, and created profiles for each character, often based on information about real people. There are several outlines of the plot and notes she made while the novel was being written.

The third section, titled "Transition Between Novels", includes draft material for three unfinished projects. The first was a non-fiction book to be called The Moral Basis of Individualism. The second was a movie about the development of the atomic bomb, tentatively titled Top Secret. The third was an essay called "To All Innocent Fifth Columnists", to be circulated by a proposed organization of conservative intellectuals that never formed. This section also reprints a transcript of Rand's 1949 testimony before the House Un-American Activities Committee, along with her own notes about the committee's efforts to investigate Communism.

The fourth section, "Atlas Shrugged", has her notes and outlines for her final novel. In addition to planning for characters and plot points, her notes include research on the railroad and steel industries, and thoughts on various philosophical issues to be addressed in the novel.

The fifth and final section, "Final Years", covers the years 1955 to 1977. It includes notes about "psycho-epistemology" and ideas for two possible books. One was a non-fiction book about Rand's philosophy of Objectivism. The other was a novel to be titled To Lorne Dieterling.

== Reception ==
Objectivist philosopher David Kelley described the material in Rand's journals as "contain[ing] a number of passages that explain key points in her philosophy more fully and clearly than anything she published." Kelley called the book "a treasure" and said Harriman's editing was "skillful", although he criticized Harriman for not providing more complete notes on cases where Rand had later changed her positions from those documented in the journal entries. Writing for the libertarian magazine Reason, Walter Olson said the book was "a less-than-ideal place to start for those not already closely familiar with the Russian-born author's work." However, he said it did "furnish a deep popcorn bowl of sheer fan value" for those interested in Rand. A brief review in The Washington Post called it a "valuable sourcebook" for those interested in Rand.

In The New York Times Book Review, conservative writer David Brooks offered his "harsh assessment" that the insights Rand had about the dangers of collectivism were "made absurd only by the philosophy she piled on top of it." For aspiring writers, he said, "The journals' central lesson is that one should never underestimate the importance of pomposity." This review produced responses in the form of a short article in Liberty calling it an "uninformed hatchet job" and a letter from philosopher Allan Gotthelf calling it "the usual sneers".

In a bibliography of Rand's works, Mimi Reisel Gladstein said the book "illustrates Rand’s dedication to her craft and her meticulous preparation for writing." Both Brooks and Gladstein indicated that the term 'journals' was misleading because the material focuses on Rand's works and ideas, instead of more personal thoughts.

Describing Rand as a rigorous but misanthropic thinker, Booklist said her journals would "be of vital interest to many". In contrast, Publishers Weekly said it was of interest only for those who were "lovers and loathers" of Rand, describing the book as being "As intriguing yet sometimes numbing as her fiction". Choice recommended the book for academic libraries, saying it would be welcomed by "Rand aficionados". Reviews of the book were also published in Kirkus Reviews and the Los Angeles Times.

=== Concerns about editing ===
In a review of the book in Liberty magazine, Stephen Cox questioned the editorial choices made by Harriman. He said that Harriman tried "to steer a middle course" between casual and scholarly readers of Rand's work, but he wondered "where should the line be drawn?" He cited examples given by Harriman as the types of passages omitted, saying some of them were "precisely the kind of note that scholars want to see". Cox also said that Harriman's editing for grammar and "wordiness" was insufficiently explained, which acted "to undermine the objective authority of the text."

In an article in the next issue of Liberty, Rand scholar Chris Matthew Sciabarra raised additional concerns about how Harriman had edited the material. Sciabarra compared a passage that had been published previously in The Intellectual Activist with the corresponding passage in the book. He found differences between the two, including the omission of a reference to Albert Jay Nock in the book version. He quoted Harriman's preface about how changes from the original were supposed to be noted in the text, and said, "When such editorial changes are not made explicit, when not even ellipsis points are provided to indicate missing text, doubt is cast unnecessarily on the volume's authenticity." Citing Sciabarra's essay, Gladstein gave the book as an example of publishing efforts by Rand's estate that "have not always exhibited a confidence-inspiring level of academic rigor." In his book The Ayn Rand Cult, journalist Jeff Walker suggested the published journals might be "completely unreliable and ... may have been thoroughly twisted in the interests of the present-day cult".

While writing a biography of Rand, historian Jennifer Burns worked with the original journals in the Ayn Rand Archives, and compared the material there with published versions. She said Rand's journals had been edited in ways that are "significant and problematic." Burns said Harriman's changes "significantly alter Rand's meaning" in a number of cases, transforming the tentative and evolving ideas in Rand's notes into "a slick manufactured world in which all her ideas are definite, well formulated, and clear." In an entry on her blog describing her experiences at the archives, Burns said the staff of the archives "heartily disapproved" of how the book was edited.

== See also ==
- Murder of Marion Parker
