= The Ayn Rand Cult =

Nonfiction book by journalist Jeff Walker

- First edition cover
- Author: Jeff Walker
- Language: English
- Subjects: Objectivist movement Ayn Rand
- Publisher: Open Court
- Publication date: 1999
- Publication place: United States
- Media type: Print (paperback)
- Pages: 396
- ISBN: 0-8126-9390-6
- OCLC: 39914039

The Ayn Rand Cult is a book by journalist Jeff Walker, published by Open Court Publishing Company in 1999. Walker discusses the history of the Objectivist movement started by novelist and philosopher Ayn Rand, which he describes as a cult.

== Background ==
The Objectivist movement began with a small group of Rand's confidants and students who supported her philosophy of Objectivism. This group was at first known informally as "The Collective", and later gained more structure in the form of the Nathaniel Branden Institute (NBI), named after Rand's protege Nathaniel Branden, and a magazine that Rand and Branden co-edited. From its early days, Rand's following was sometimes criticized as a "cult" or "religion". Walker's book is another entry in this vein of criticism, and the first full-length book to focus entirely on the "cult" allegation.

Walker worked on a two-hour radio program about Rand for the Canadian Broadcasting Corporation. The program was called Ideas: The Legacy of Ayn Rand and aired in 1992. Walker used the interviews he conducted for that program when writing his book.

== Contents ==
After Walker's introduction, the opening chapter discusses the dynamics of the movement during Rand's lifetime, including her behavior at NBI events and her relationships with her followers. The second chapter tackles directly the question of whether Objectivism is a cult, arguing that it displays elements of thought control and meets many criteria for a "destructive cult". The third chapter discusses the development of the movement since Rand's death, including the founding of the Ayn Rand Institute by Leonard Peikoff, and Peikoff's disputes with other movement figures. The fourth covers Rand's views on subjects such as art and human sexuality, and how these impacted her followers.

Three chapters focus on individuals other than Rand. The first discusses her former protege and lover, Branden. The next covers her heir, Peikoff. The last of these chapters is about the most famous member of the Collective, former Federal Reserve Board chairman Alan Greenspan. Walker then turns to Rand's ideas, accusing her of dogmatism, ignorance, and flawed thinking. A chapter about her "dark side" describes her as hostile and domineering.

Two chapters discuss Walker's theories about the origin of Rand's ideas. The first, "The Roots of Objectivism", discusses various influences and precursors that Walker believes contributed to Rand's ideas. The other discusses possible influences on Rand's novel Atlas Shrugged. The final chapter discusses Rand's legacy.

== Reception ==
Kirkus Reviews says Walker is "too shrill, repetitive, and even snide", but nonetheless the book "does convey vividly the frightful mess that was Ayn Rand." A reviewer for The Globe and Mail said the book is "often clumsily written", but nonetheless provides "an absorbing portrait" of the movement that offers "striking glimpses" of its participants.

In a review for Liberty magazine, R.W. Bradford describes the book as overly one-sided in its hostility and accuses Walker of hyperbole, fallacies and factual errors. In The Guardian, David Cohen said Walker's book "may be even more hysterical than the movement he seeks to disparage".

An overview of Rand's ideas aimed at businesspeople says the book "deserves a read, if only for its unremittingly negative interpretation of every facet of its topic." In a bibliographical guide to Rand's works and the literature about her, Mimi Reisel Gladstein says Walker "often depends on innuendo, rather than logic" and concludes, "There is material of interest here, but one has to pick through a lot of muck to get at it."

In a review for the Objectivist magazine Full Context, Chris Matthew Sciabarra says that Walker has some "valuable insights" and "theoretical points [that] need to be grappled with", but his book "ultimately disappoints" because Walker "exhibits the characteristics of a tabloid journalist" and engages in "endless tirades, strung together in a rather disorganized fashion, amounting to a series of vitriolic ad hominems directed toward most of the major figures in Objectivism."
