= The Art of Fiction: A Guide for Writers and Readers =

Book by Ayn Rand

- Paperback cover
- Editor: Tore Boeckmann
- Author: Ayn Rand
- Language: English
- Subject: Fiction writing
- Publisher: Plume
- Publication date: 2000
- Publication place: United States
- Media type: Print (paperback)
- Pages: 180
- ISBN: 0-452-28154-7
- OCLC: 41488890

The Art of Fiction: A Guide for Writers and Readers is a book about fiction writing by the Russian-born American author and philosopher Ayn Rand, published posthumously. Edited by Tore Boeckmann, it was published by Plume in 2000. The book is based on a 1958 series of lectures about fiction writing which Rand gave to a group of student readers and writers in her living room. A companion book is The Art of Nonfiction.

== Background ==
In 1958, Rand delivered a series of private lectures about writing fiction. A successful novelist, playwright and screenwriter, Rand had released her last novel, Atlas Shrugged, the previous year. Rand's heir (and lecture attendee) Leonard Peikoff says in his introduction for the book that she "was at the peak of her powers as a novelist". The lectures were informal, delivered in the living room of her New York apartment to around a dozen people, by invitation only. These included personal friends and students from the Nathaniel Branden Lectures, a lecture series developed by Rand's protege Nathaniel Branden. Rand led 12 four-hour sessions over six months. The sessions were recorded and later made available for purchase. Boeckmann edited the book out of transcripts of those recordings and related materials, including a follow-up lecture Rand gave in 1959 and comments from a 1969 lecture series she did about non-fiction writing.

== Publishing history ==
The book was published as a paperback by Plume, an imprint of the Penguin Group, in January 2000. It has also been published as an e-book.

== Contents ==
After an introduction by Peikoff and preface by Boeckmann, the material from Rand begins with a discussion of the role of the subconscious in writing. The second chapter discusses literature as an art form. Several chapters then discuss plotting, including the relationship between plot and theme, and how to create a climax. There is a chapter on characterization and three chapters on style. The final chapter is titled "Special Forms of Literature" and discusses such matters as humor, fantasy and tragedy.

== Reception ==
Literature professor Stephen D. Cox reviewed the book for The Journal of Ayn Rand Studies. He says the book provides valuable insights into Rand's literary views and techniques, which go beyond what was included in her earlier book The Romantic Manifesto. However, he describes some of her claims as exaggerated, and says some of her ideas are "provocative but insufficiently developed".

In her biography of Rand, Goddess of the Market, historian Jennifer Burns mentions The Art of Fiction as one of several books that "are derived from archival materials but have been significantly rewritten." Cox also expresses concerns about how the material was edited, saying that the nature and extent of the changes is not made clear enough in the finished text.
