= The New Left: The Anti-Industrial Revolution =

1971 book by Ayn Rand

- Cover of the first edition
- Author: Ayn Rand
- Language: English
- Subject: New Left
- Publisher: New American Library
- Publication date: 1971 (1st edition); 1975 (2nd edition); 1999 (retitled edition)
- Publication place: United States
- Media type: Print (paperback)
- Pages: 204 (1st edition); 239 (2nd edition); 352 (retitled edition)
- ISBN: 978-0-452-01184-7 (retitled edition)

The New Left: The Anti-Industrial Revolution is a 1971 collection of essays by the philosopher Ayn Rand, in which the author argues that religion, the New Left, and similar forces are irrational and harmful. A revised edition appeared in 1975, and an expanded edition edited by Peter Schwartz was published in 1999 under the title Return of the Primitive: The Anti-Industrial Revolution. Most of the essays originally appeared in The Objectivist.

== Background ==
The inspiration for collecting these essays into a book came from a reader, who wrote Rand a letter complimenting several of the essays and suggesting she put them out as a book to counteract the influence of the New Left among college students.

== Publication history ==
The first edition of the book was published by New American Library in 1971, as a paperback under its Signet imprint. A revised edition, adding the essay "The Age of Envy", appeared in 1975.

In 1999, Rand's estate authorized publication of an expanded edition titled Return of the Primitive: The Anti-Industrial Revolution. It was edited by Peter Schwartz and added a new introduction by Schwartz, as well as two essays by Rand ("Racism" was included in The Virtue of Selfishness, and "Global Balkanization" was in The Voice of Reason) and three by Schwartz ("Gender Tribalism", "The Philosophy of Privation", and "Multicultural Nihilism").

== Reception ==
The book received little attention from reviewers when it was first released. In a survey of Rand's works, historian James T. Baker described the book's essays as "shrill proclamations" that are "more negative than positive, more destructive than constructive." Rand bibliographer Mimi Reisel Gladstein said the book's topics "seem dated", but "as Rand's predictions about the negative results of some of the practices she rails against come about, one begins to appreciate the perceptiveness of her logic."
