= Michelle Marder Kamhi =

Scholar and critic of the arts

- Born: June 9, 1937
- Died: April 27, 2025 (aged 87)
- Citizenship: United States
- Education: Barnard College, Hunter College
- Occupations: Scholar and critic of the arts
- Spouse: Louis Torres
- Writing career
- Language: English
- Website: www.mmkamhi.com

Michelle Marder Kamhi (June 9, 1937 - April 27, 2025) was an independent scholar and critic of the arts. She co-edited Aristos (an online review of the arts) with her husband, Louis Torres, and is the author of Who Says That’s Art? A Commonsense View of the Visual Arts (2014) and Bucking the Artworld Tide: Reflections on Art, Pseudo Art, Art Education & Theory (2020). She also co-authored What Art Is: The Esthetic Theory of Ayn Rand (2000) with Torres. Kamhi has written on all the fine arts, but her particular focus is on the visual arts and art education. Throughout her work, she argues for a traditional view of art. But she differs from other conservative critics in regarding the invention of abstract painting and sculpture in the early twentieth century as the "decisive turning point in the breakdown of the concept of art."

Kamhi was a member of the American Society for Aesthetics, the National Art Education Association (NAEA), the National Association of Scholars, and AICA-USA (the U.S. branch of the International Association of Art Critics). Articles by her have appeared in The Wall Street Journal, Art Education (published by the NAEA), Arts Education Policy Review, The Journal of Ayn Rand Studies, and Academic Questions, among other publications. Following the release of Who Says That’s Art?, she began a blog, entitled For Piero’s Sake, to honor the artistic values represented by Piero della Francesca—that is, "consummate skill and sensitivity in the embodiment of things of enduring human significance." She further noted: "Since those values should adhere to the terms art and artist today, For Piero’s Sake aims in no small measure to serve as an antidote to the bogus art and pseudo artists dominating the contemporary artworld."

== Early life and education ==
Born in New York City in 1937, Kamhi (née Marder) was a graduate of Hunter College High School and Barnard College, where she obtained her B.A. in 1958. Having majored in Geology, she went to Paris as a Fulbright Scholar to study vertebrate paleontology. The year she spent abroad sparked an interest in fine art. After returning to New York, she took a course on Italian Renaissance Painting at Columbia University with the now-legendary professor of art history Howard McParlin Davis. When she later earned an M.A. in Art History at Hunter College, he served as the advisor for her Master's thesis on Piero della Francesca’s double portrait of Federico da Montefeltro and his wife, Battista Sforza, and the allegorical triumphs on the reverse of the portraits.

== Career ==
Prior to joining Aristos in 1984, Kamhi worked in book publishing, first doing editorial work at Houghton Mifflin Company and then serving as an editor at Columbia University Press, on such titles as Salo Wittmayer Baron’s Social and Religious History of the Jews. She was later active as a freelance editor and writer on a variety of subjects. An article she wrote about a nutrition education project she organized at her son’s public school gained national attention. The article received a 1980 Health Journalism Award from the American Chiropractic Association, and was featured in the revised edition of Frances Moore Lappé’s best-selling book Diet for a Small Planet. Kamhi later served as the principal researcher and writer for a nationwide survey sponsored by the American Library Association, the Association for Supervision and Curriculum Development, and the Association of American Publishers on controversies regarding reading materials in public school classrooms and libraries. Following that, she wrote about a constructive response to such controversy by teachers in a rural Ohio school district. She subsequently conceived, produced, and directed Books Our Children Read, a half-hour film documenting that response. Completed in 1984, it was distributed by Films Incorporated.

Since then, Kamhi has focused on the arts and art education, writing articles for Aristos and other publications in addition to her books:

- Bucking the Artworld Tide: Reflections on Art, Pseudo Art, Art Education & Theory. New York: Pro Arte Books, 2020.
- Who Says That’s Art? A Commonsense View of the Visual Arts. New York: Pro Arte Books, 2014.
- What Art Is: The Esthetic Theory of Ayn Rand (co-authored with Louis Torres). Chicago: Open Court, 2000.

== Critical response to work ==
=== Aristos ===
Founded by Louis Torres as a modest six-page journal in 1982, Aristos advocates objective standards in arts scholarship and criticism. Rejecting the inventions of both modernism and postmodernism, it champions contemporary work "that, like the great art of past centuries, is concerned with fundamental human values, and is both intelligible and well crafted." Its editorial viewpoint is "broadly informed" by Ayn Rand's Objectivist philosophy—in particular, by the theory of art she outlined in the first four essays of The Romantic Manifesto.

Library Journal (May 15, 1988) recommended Aristos, noting: "The value is there, particularly as the point of view is unique." Magazines for Libraries (6th ed., 1989) observed:

Although its format is that of a six-page newsletter, Aristos is actually a journal . . . with a unique point of view. Encompassing the literary, performing, and fine arts . . ., it seeks to promote the traditional values of the past in its dedication "to an artistic spirit which projects and celebrates the best and noblest aspects of man and his universe." Hence, its title is derived from the Greek for "best, finest.". . . Aristos is not just a passive, idealistic publication; it vigorously challenges modernist scholars and critics. . . . A scholarly but gutsy little periodical that, because it argues an unfashionable thesis, should be part of serious, large art history collections.

The 7th & 8th eds. (1993, 1997) of Magazines for Libraries further noted: "Aristos looks like a negligible newsletter, but [its feature articles carry] more weight than those found in more substantial periodicals. . . . [It] is a necessary adjunct to any good research collection."

Publication of the print journal was suspended in the fall of 1997 to enable the editors to focus on researching and writing What Art Is: The Esthetic Theory of Ayn Rand, based on a series of articles they had published in Aristos in 1991 and 1992. Following the book's publication in 2000, Torres and Kamhi published What Art Is Online. A chapter-by-chapter supplement to What Art Is, it included a number of articles comparable to those previously published in Aristos. In January 2003, Aristos was reborn online.

An article by Kamhi in the inaugural online issue of Aristos—on art and cognition (an important aspect of Rand's theory)—was listed in the popular online aggregator ArtsJournal.com. It generated a protracted online debate about abstract art with the painter Kirk Hughey. An updated and expanded version of the article was later published in After the Avant-Gardes, edited by Elizabeth Millán, professor of philosophy at DePaul University.

=== What Art Is ===
Published by Open Court in 2000, What Art Is is the first book-length study of Ayn Rand's little-known theory of art. A review in Choice magazine (April 2001) recommended it for all academic levels as well as for general readers—noting, in part, that "Torres and Kamhi show an encyclopedic knowledge of twentieth-century art." It concluded: "Dogmatic followers of Rand will resent their fair-minded criticisms, but their devotion to Rand's basic ideas is unquestioned. Well-documented, a major addition to Rand scholarship, and a humorous debunking of twentieth-century art, museum exhibits, and art theory."

Midwest Book Review deemed What Art Is "Highly recommended, insightful, and challenging reading for students of philosophy and arts criticism."

A review in Reason argued: "Torres and Kamhi make a provocative case for Rand's concept of art . . . by jettisoning some of her more ill-conceived and rash pronouncements. In the end, however, we are still left with a philosophy that doesn't just criticize much modern art but seems to open it up to censorship." In their response to the review, published as a letter in a subsequent issue, the authors rejected as "ill-founded" the "assumption that, because we favor an objective definition of art, we would approve the acts of censorship (and abrogation of property rights) that might result from it under present law."

Cultural critic Roger Kimball reviewed What Art Is for the neoconservative journal The Public Interest (Spring 2001). The review, entitled "Can art be defined?," was reprinted in his book Art's Prospect (2003). Beginning by dismissing the "certainty" of Ayn Rand "disciples," Kimball goes on to observe that the book is "a rich, opinionated mélange . . ., full of notes, asides, and second thoughts, but positively steely in . . . laying down the law about what does, and what does not, qualify as art." He argues that "art is not susceptible to the sort of definition [the authors] seek," and concludes that "the real issue is not whether a given object or behavior qualifies as art but rather whether it should be regarded as good art." To support his view, he quotes passages from Aristotle's Nicomachean Ethics and Immanuel Kant's Critique of Judgment. In a response published by the authors on the Aristos website, they point out alternative passages from the same works that actually support their view. In particular, they note that Kant's concept of "aesthetical Ideas" was remarkably similar to Rand's view that, through the "selective re-creation of reality," art "brings man's concepts to the perceptual level of his consciousness and allows him to grasp them directly, as if they were percepts." They also argue that "the very notion of 'good art' presupposes an objective understanding of what art is."

In a C-Span In Depth interview, cultural historian Jacques Barzun was asked what he thought of Ayn Rand and responded that he had not read her work but that her theory of art had been "the subject of a large and very interesting and thorough book by Louis Torres [and Michelle Marder Kamhi]"—which "not only remedied [his prior] ignorance" of Rand's work but prompted him to "admire a great part (not all) of her theory of art."

A review in The Art Book (September 2001), published by the British Association of Art Historians (renamed the Association for Art History), observed that Rand's esthetic theory is "not likely to find many converts in the contemporary art world," but that Torres and Kamhi have offered "a balanced critical assessment of her arguments, finding justification for [them] from archaeology, cognitive science and clinical psychology, and applying Rand's ideas to every area of contemporary culture." In a response to that review, Torres and Kamhi noted that its author had also reviewed But Is It Art? An Introduction to Art Theory, by Cynthia Freeland, in the same issue of The Art Book and was critical of her failure to define art. They add: "Freeland's book . . . is yet another instance—added to the many from today's artworld which we cited in What Art Is (pp. 7–8)—of a writer's raising the question 'But is it art?' without even attempting to answer it. That this failure on Freeland's part does not escape Vickery is reassuring."

Inspired by the publication of What Art Is . . . and by the Journal's publication of the authors' "Critical Neglect of Ayn Rand's Theory of Art" (Fall 2000), The Journal of Ayn Rand Studies featured "Ayn Rand and Art: A Symposium." Contributors included Gene Bell-Villada, Randall Dipert, David Kelley, and John Hospers. The views presented in it are too numerous to note here but can be gleaned from the responses offered by the authors in subsequent issues of the journal.

Art critic Jillian Steinhauer (who specializes in "the intersection of art and social forces") published an opinion piece on What Art Is entitled "Ayn Rand's Theory of Art" in Hyperallergic, which was reprinted in Salon as "Ayn Rand's Wacky Art Theory." Her piece was based not on reading the book but on "excerpted bits . . . as well as chapter summaries online." While she agrees with Rand's view that the primary purpose of art is nonutilitarian and psychological in nature and that its cognitive function is "to bring man's fundamental concepts and values 'to the perceptual level of his consciousness' and allow him 'to grasp them directly, as if they were percepts,'" she cannot understand why that would entail rejecting so much of the contemporary art she admires. In a response to the piece, Kamhi points out what she sees as Steinhauer's logical inconsistencies and politically inspired animus against Rand.

=== Who Says That's Art? ===
Published in 2014, Who Says That's Art? is both an analysis and defense of traditional visual art and a critique of the many avant-garde inventions since the early twentieth century, from "abstract art" to "conceptual art." Expanding on Ayn Rand's basic principles regarding the nature and function of art, Kamhi offers an extended analysis of the essentially mimetic nature of what she regards as genuine art, arguing: "Mimetic representation is not in itself the goal of art. It is the indispensable means by which art performs its psychological function."

Kirkus Reviews deemed Who Says That's Art? "an impressive companion for advanced studies in visual arts, accessible enough for general-interest readers," and further observed: "Online links to dozens of artists' works help bring the text to life, and the extensive chapter endnotes offer solid supporting resources for further study. Kamhi’s writing is forceful and persuasive." First Things noted: "Who Says That's Art? . . . offers anyone who has ever left a contemporary art museum scratching his head or muttering under his breath the chance to release a big, therapeutic sigh of relief. Kamhi first . . . legitimiz[es] this natural aversion to most modern art . . . and then gets to work on methodically proving her point." The Journal of Information Ethics observed: "This perceptive study, an 'indictment of the avant-garde's spurious inventions,' is so encompassing that it would be impossible in a brief review even to mention the many interconnected issues and areas the author covers in superb exemplified detail." In the view of Academic Questions: "Who Says That's Art? occupies some of the same debunking gallery space as Tom Wolfe's The Painted Word, except that Kamhi seems less interested in puncturing pretension than she is in teaching us how to look."

In sharp contrast with those reviews largely agreeing with Kamhi's thesis, an artist who reviewed Who Says That's Art? for the Canadian e-zine Arts & Opinion wrote that it "made [her], by stages, angry, contrary, furious, dismissive," adding: "but, most importantly, thoughtful." While she considered the book "well written [and] scrupulously researched," she vehemently objected to Kamhi's rejection of avant-garde work, arguing: "Twentieth century art requires a different language and means of representation than nineteenth century art in order to accurately, convincingly reflect the zeitgeist."

Since a chapter of Who Says That's Art? is devoted to a critique of art education, the book has generated controversy among art educators. See "On art education," below.

=== On art education ===
In "Rethinking Art Education," chapter 8 of Who Says That's Art?, Kamhi focuses on two trends in the field that she thinks "should be of concern to thoughtful citizens, even to those with little interest in art." They are "a growing politicization of the field by educators bent on establishing what they deem to be social justice" and "an increasing focus on dubious works of 'contemporary art' that are often nothing more than political gestures under the guise of art."

Reviewing the book in Canadian Art Teacher, David Pariser (a professor of art education at Concordia University, Montreal) wrote: "As an introduction to a number of perennial problems of art, this book is a stimulating first look. Many of the key issues related to responding to art, making art, evaluating art, decoding aesthetic theory and criticism are laid out from a provocative perspective—one that may resonate with viewers who are baffled by 'contemporary art.'" While he was "cheered by Kamhi's commentary on the politicization of art, and art education," he objected to other aspects, however, such as her "dogmatic approach" regarding abstract work—which he imputed to an unwavering "faith in [Ayn] Rand." Despite his "significant reservations" about the book, he nevertheless endorsed it as "a useful addition to any undergraduate or graduate reading list, . . . for it will generate debate and engaged discussion."

Another professor of art education, Richard Ciganko, reviewed Who Says That's Art? in Studies in Art Education, the research journal of the National Art Education Association (NAEA). He observed that "[f]rom the point of view of the art-world establishment," the book "may at worst be ignored, or at best be cynically derided as out of date and irrelevant. On the other hand, ordinary readers may welcome [it] as a confirmation of their sense that the story of 'The Emperor's New Clothes' best describes today's 'art.'"

Others in art education have taken issue with various articles by Kamhi. An opinion piece she published in the Wall Street Journal criticizing the politicization of art education, prompted R. Barry Shauck—a Boston University professor of art education then serving as president of the NAEA—to post a response on the organization's website. In it he defended Judi Werthein's Brinco (a "performance art" piece whose inclusion in art education Kamhi had questioned) as if it were a work of "graphic" art comparable to Pablo Picasso's Guernica. In a rejoinder, Kamhi pointed out that Werthein's piece ("consisting mainly of [her] passing out specially equipped sneakers to illegal immigrants") was by no means a work of graphic art. In Kamhi's view, including it in art education revealed a "glaring disconnect" between the NAEA's professional code—which characterized art as works "in graphic form" and had even been quoted by Shauck—and what he and other prominent members of the organization treat as art.

In addition, Kamhi's Wall Street Journal article prompted Richard Kessler—who then headed The Center for Arts Education (he later became dean of the Mannes School of Music)—to dub her the "Joe McCarthy of Art Education." Years later, in a blog post entitled "How NOT to Be an Arts Advocate," Kamhi argued that Kessler's "scurrilous" post revealed "arrogance compounded with ignorance."

Edward O. Stewart, an associate professor of art education in the College of Fine Arts at Illinois State University, wrote "A Response to Michelle Kamhi" in Art Education magazine (published by the NAEA). He aimed to defend "visual culture studies" and "social justice art education" against objections raised by Kamhi in several articles. In a response entitled "At Least He Spelled My Name Right," Kamhi argued: "[Stewart] often misrepresents my views in key respects. He cites only three of the many articles I've written on these and related matters over the past decade. And he is far from having fully grasped or responded to my viewpoint."

=== Bucking the Artworld Tide ===
Published in 2020, Bucking the Artworld Tide is a collection of essays comprising more than three decades of Kamhi's writing and speaking. It offers both an appreciation of traditional visual art and a critique of various avant-garde inventions since the early twentieth century, as well as of the underlying theoretical assumptions. A section of the book also deals with art education.

Kirkus Reviews wrote that Bucking the Artworld Tide is "solidly argued and thoughtfully presented. . . . The collection's eloquent prose and well-developed point of view make it a thought-provoking and often enjoyable read even for those who disagree. Kamhi's passion for her subject is undeniable and makes even the more technical aspects of the work accessible. An illuminating, strongly opinionated, and enthusiastically acerbic critique of today's art world."

Midwest Book Review observed that the book "shakes the foundation of today's art establishment, challenging its basic tenets. . . . Buttressed by ample scholarship, extensively footnoted, Bucking the Artworld Tide. . . . merits a place in any collection of books of interest to visual artists, art lovers, and art educators."

In the view of BookLife (a division of Publishers Weekly): "[T]his pull-no-punches essay collection deriding abstract art and its postmodernist successors. . . . makes a passionate and effective argument that such work is 'incomprehensible to the poor viewer' and advocates for representational art to regain its primacy. . . . [T]hough [Kamhi] may not win over devotees of modernism, readers who find abstract and conceptual art baffling will be thrilled to encounter a kindred spirit."

An in-depth review in the Journal of Ayn Rand Studies argues that "Kamhi presents a compelling case against the modernist and postmodernist inventions that have come to dominate the artworld since the early twentieth century." It further maintains: "While acknowledging her profound indebtedness to Rand's major insights regarding the nature and function of art, Kamhi takes issue with [her] on particular works and periods of art, noting that Rand was 'a generally poor mentor when it came down to specifics.'"

Kamhi was interviewed about the book by Mark Bauerlein of First Things and Eric Metaxas.
