= Ayn Rand: The Russian Radical =

Book by Chris Matthew Sciabarra

- Cover
- Author: Chris Matthew Sciabarra
- Language: English
- Subjects: Ayn Rand; Objectivism
- Publisher: Pennsylvania State University Press
- Publication date: 1995
- Publication place: United States
- Media type: Print (Hardcover and Paperback)
- Pages: 477
- ISBN: 0-271-01440-7
- OCLC: 31133644
- Preceded by: Marx, Hayek, and Utopia
- Followed by: Total Freedom: Toward a Dialectical Libertarianism

Ayn Rand: The Russian Radical is a 1995 book by Chris Matthew Sciabarra tracing the intellectual roots of 20th-century Russian-American novelist and philosopher Ayn Rand and the philosophy she developed, Objectivism.

The book is the second volume in a trilogy on dialectics and libertarianism. The Russian Radical explores Rand's college influences and intellectual roots—particularly the role of Rand's philosophy teacher, Nicholas Onufrievich Lossky—and argues that Rand's philosophical method was dialectical in nature.

== Background ==
Sciabarra was introduced to Rand's ideas while in high school. He began serious study of her in relation to dialectical thinking while working on his doctoral degree at New York University. In 1984, he began a "systematic study of the dialectical aspects of Rand's philosophy," research that eventually led to the book.

Sciabarra had difficulty securing a publisher. As he described it ten years later, many academic presses were uninterested in publishing a book about Rand, while commercial presses were put off by the scholarly nature of the content. The book was eventually published by the Pennsylvania State University Press in August 1995. It is the second volume in a three-book series by Sciabarra called "Dialectics and Liberty", which he conceived while working on his dissertation. On account of publishing delays, its predecessor, Marx, Hayek, and Utopia, came out that same month.

== Summary ==
=== Part One: The Process of Becoming ===
In his introduction, Sciabarra briefly describes the difficulties facing the Rand scholar, then provides a quick overview of dialectics. Part One, "The Process of Becoming," examines Rand's intellectual development out of her Russian background. Chapter 1 describes the various currents in Russian philosophy during Rand's childhood and youth, including the views of the Slavophiles, of Vladimir Solovyov, of various literary figures of the Silver Age, and of Russian Marxists. Chapter 2 focuses on Lossky's teachings, which "exhibited a Russian proclivity to synthesize opposites and resolve antagonisms. He rejected the dualistic obsession with dichotomies of rationalism or empiricism, idealism or materialism, knowledge or existence. These alternatives were, for him, partial and incomplete. Like other thinkers in Russian philosophy, however, Lossky achieved the ultimate integration through a mystical Absolute." According to Sciabarra, Rand would join Lossky in rejecting all of these dichotomies, but did not accept his appeal to religious faith. In Chapter 3 discusses Rand's education at the Stoiunin Gymnasium, at a high school in the Crimea, and at Leningrad State University, where she majored in history. Chapter 4 surveys Rand's maturation as a thinker after she emigrated to the United States in 1926, taking on such controversies as whether she was in a "Nietzschean phase" when she wrote her first novel, We the Living.

=== Part Two: The Revolt against Dualism ===
In Part Two, "The Revolt against Dualism," Sciabarra presents Rand's mature philosophical system, emphasizing its dialectical aspects. Chapter 5 offers a treatment of the Objectivist metaphysics, including Rand's emphatic opposition to the ideas of Immanuel Kant. Sciabarra says that Lossky was "the chief Russian translator of Kant's works. He too had criticized Kant's contention that true being (things-in-themselves) transcends consciousness and remains forever unknowable." Chapter 6 surveys Objectivist epistemology, including Rand's views on perception, concepts, and free will; Sciabarra ties Rand's emphasis on the role of contextuality in concept formation to the importance of internal relations in dialectical thinking. In Chapter 7 Sciabarra takes on Rand's conception of the relations between reason and emotion, drawing attention to the psychological theories that she developed in collaboration with Nathaniel Branden. Chapter 8 brings together Rand's theories about the nature and function of art, and her critiques, subsequently elaborated by Leonard Peikoff, of rationalism and empiricism. Chapter 9 offers a lengthy examination of Rand's ethical theory, focusing on her reworking of egoism, her critique of altruism, and the relationship between her conception of morality and Aristotle's eudaimonism. Chapter 10 completes the survey with Rand's political philosophy, which Sciabarra identifies as a form of libertarianism. Sciabarra discusses the reciprocal relations between reason and freedom, and between faith and force; Rand's defense of individual rights; her distinctive "nondualistic conception of government, one that is neither anarchistic nor statist in its orientation"; and her defense of capitalism, which he contrasts with Marx's critique.

=== Part Three: The Radical Rand ===
Part Three of Sciabarra's book discusses the application of Rand's ideas to political, social and historical issues. In Chapter 11, he diagrams Rand's analysis of power relations, in which Level 3 (economic and political functioning), Level 2 (linguistic and ideological functioning) and Level 1 (individual psycho-epistemological and ethical functioning) are all interrelated. He connects Rand's insight that "a leash is only a rope with a noose at both ends" (The Fountainhead) and her conception of "the sanction of the victim" (Atlas Shrugged) with Hegel's analysis of the codependency between master and slave. Chapter 12, "The Predatory State," traces Rand's account of the dynamics of the mixed economy, her analyses of racism and tribalism, and her rejection of both political conservatism and political liberalism. Chapter 13 is concerned with Rand's philosophy of history, which rejects Marxist materialism in favor of the view that "a society's history is a logical unfolding of the philosophical premises it has internalized," He concludes with her vision of the rise of the New Intellectuals, who "conquer dualism and reunite the prodigal sons of capitalism: the intellectual and the businessman" and the ultimate emergence of an Objectivist society.

=== The second edition ===
In 2013, Pennsylvania State University Press published an expanded second edition of the book, which included a new preface and three new appendices. The first appendix is a reprint of a 1999 essay, "The Rand Transcript," first published in The Journal of Ayn Rand Studies, which includes an examination of the actual transcript of Rand's coursework at Petrograd University. The second appendix is a reprint of a 2005 Journal of Ayn Rand Studies essay, "The Rand Transcript, Revisited." The third appendix answers a critique of Sciabarra's historical work by Shoshana Milgram. The second edition also includes an expanded discussion of Rand's radical critique of U.S. foreign policy, "The Welfare-Warfare State," now included in Chapter 12 of the book. The book also includes a much expanded index and bibliography.

== Reception ==
In a review for The Freeman, David Brown wrote, "Much to my surprise the author of Ayn Rand: The Russian Radical, a comprehensive new study of Rand's thought and its genesis in Russian culture, has persuaded me that something called 'dialectics' is integral to Ayn Rand's philosophic approach and crucial to its success. Russian Radical is a different kind of look at Ayn Rand, a full-fledged 'hermeneutic' on the contours, development, and interpretation of her thought." According to a review by Lester H. Hunt in Liberty, "It is indicative of the interest of this book that I have so far engaged in an argument with it instead of saying how good I think it is on the whole. Among other things, it is an excellent synthesis of the Objectivist literature, both the works of Rand and those of her immediate successors. Sciabarra's mastery of enormous amounts of material is almost literally incredible. He also manages to break entirely new ground on several different issues."

In her biography Goddess of the Market, Jennifer Burns wrote, "The first author to integrate Rand's life and thought was Chris Sciabarra […]. Though written without access to Rand's personal papers, Sciabarra's book employed original research and brought to light hitherto unknown information about Rand's educational background."

A mixed review by James G. Lennox said, "Its author has an encyclopedic familiarity with the writings of Ayn Rand and with virtually everyone who has advocated, commented on, or written critically about Objectivism. ... He is the first of her commentators to explore the intellectual milieu of Rand's early, formative years, providing a deeper appreciation for her occasional scathing remarks about Russian culture as she had experienced it. All of this material is discussed, and exhaustively referenced, in the interests of providing a comprehensive analysis of Objectivism, not merely as a philosophical system, but as a philosophical and cultural movement." However, Lennox questioned whether Ayn Rand had ever taken a philosophy course from Lossky, let alone been influenced by his own philosophical method, and he recommended against construing Rand's method of challenging dichotomies or "false alternatives" as dialectical.

The Russian Radical received a negative review from John Ridpath, a director of the Ayn Rand Institute. Ridpath claimed that The Russian Radical was postmodern and deconstructionist in its overall orientation, that it was one of the "worthless products" of contemporary academia, and that on the whole it was "preposterous in its thesis, destructive in its purpose, and tortuously numbing in its content."
