= Peter Schwartz (writer) =

American journalist (born 1949)

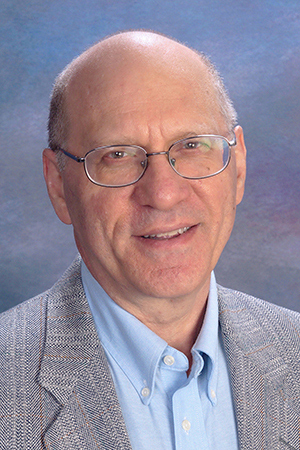
- Born: 1949 (age 76–77)
- Education: Syracuse University (MA)
- Writing career
- Subject: Philosophy
- Notable work: In Defense of Selfishness
- Website: PeterSchwartz.com

Peter Schwartz (born 1949) is an American journalist. He is an Objectivist and writes opinion pieces and books from that viewpoint.

== Career ==
A former chairman of the board, and currently a distinguished fellow, of the Ayn Rand Institute, Schwartz writes and lectures on a variety of topics, including environmentalism, foreign policy, political philosophy and ethics. He received a Master of Arts in journalism from Syracuse University and has taught advanced writing classes at the Ayn Rand Institute's Objectivist Academic Center.

He is the author of In Defense of Selfishness: Why the Code of Self-Sacrifice Is Unjust and Destructive; The Foreign Policy of Self-Interest: A Moral Ideal for America; Libertarianism: The Perversion of Liberty; and The Battle for Laissez-Faire Capitalism. He also writes on current issues for his blog, PeterSchwartz.com.

His articles have been published in The Washington Post, the Chicago Tribune, ForbesOnline, Huffington Post and the Hartford Courant.

He was the founding editor and publisher of The Intellectual Activist (1979–1991), a periodical that covered political and social issues from a pro-individual rights perspective. From 1987 to 2003, he was president and editor-in-chief at Second Renaissance Books, a book publisher and distributor.

Schwartz edited two collections of essays by Ayn Rand: The Ayn Rand Column and 1999's Return of the Primitive: The Anti-Industrial Revolution, for which he was also a contributing author. In Return of the Primitive Schwartz included an essay entitled 'Multicultural Nihilism' in which he characterized lifeism as a prejudice of evaluating of life over death. He was also co-editor, with Marlene Podritske, of Objectively Speaking: Ayn Rand Interviewed.

== Published works ==
- "Libertarianism: The Perversion of Liberty" (chapter) in The Voice of Reason: Essays in Objectivist Thought (New American Library, 1988) ISBN 0452010462
- "Israel Does Not Violate Palestinian Civil Rights" (chapter) in Israel: Opposing Viewpoint (Greenhaven Press, 1989) ISBN 0899084354
- "Gender Tribalism," "The Philosophy of Privation" and "Multicultural Nihilism" (chapters) in Return of the Primitive: The Anti-Industrial Revolution (Meridian, 1999) ISBN 0452011841
- Introduction to The Art of Nonfiction (Plume., 2001) ISBN 0452282314
- "Racial 'Diversity' Is Racism" (chapter) in Racism: Current Controversies (Greenhaven Press, 2003) ISBN 0737744626
- The Foreign Policy of Self-Interest: A Moral Ideal for America (ARI Press, 2004) ISBN 0962533661
- "Moral Values Without Religion" in Indianapolis Post-Tribune, June 2, 2005
- "Israel Has a Right to Exist" (chapter, co-authored with Yaron Brook) in Israel: Opposing Viewpoints (Greenhaven Press, 2005) ISBN 0737725893
- "In Defense of Income Inequality" in Tampa Tribune, March 10, 2007
- "Why Is the Tea Party 'Extremist'"? at Forbes Online, November 11, 2013
- "The Opponents of ObamaCare Are Completely Missing The Point" at Forbes Online, December 12, 2013
- "Objecting to the 'Season of Giving'" in the Washington Post, December 19, 2014
- "Christmas with Ayn Rand" in the Chicago Tribune, December 23, 2014
- "A Real Right to Life" at Huffington Post, January 12, 2015
- In Defense of Selfishness: Why the Code of Self-Sacrifice Is Unjust and Destructive (Palgrave Macmillan, June 2015) ISBN 1137280166

== Lectures ==
Schwartz lectures on college campuses and at various conferences. He has been interviewed on radio and TV by such personalities as Geraldo Rivera and Thom Hartmann. His lectures include:

- The Writing Process
- Capitalism and Selfishness
- Clarity in Conceptualization: The Art of Identifying “Package-Deals”
- Barriers to Cognition
- The Epistemology of Altruism
- The “Diversity” Delusion
- The Virtue of Selfishness: Why Achieving Your Happiness Is Your Highest Moral Purpose
- America's Foreign Policy: Self-Interest vs Self-Sacrifice
- Free Minds and Free Markets
