= R. W. Bradford =

American writer (1947–2005)

Raymond William Bradford
- Born: September 20, 1947; Detroit, Michigan, US
- Died: December 8, 2005 (aged 58); Port Townsend, Washington, US
- Occupation: Magazine editor
- Known for: Founder of Liberty magazine

Raymond William "Bill" Bradford (September 20, 1947 – December 8, 2005), who used R. W. Bradford as his pen name, was an American writer chiefly known for editing, publishing, and writing for the libertarian magazine Liberty.

== Early life ==
Bradford was born on September 20, 1947, in Detroit, Michigan. He was the son of Raymond Bradford and Eleanor Ritter Bradford.

He edited his first periodical, a short-lived mimeographed zine called Eleutherian Forum, while a teenager.

During the 1970s he developed a prosperous precious metals and numismatic business in Lansing, Michigan, Liberty Coin Service. He partially retired in 1980, moving to Port Townsend, Washington, with his wife.

== Liberty magazine ==
For Liberty, which he started in 1987, he wrote under his own name as well as several pseudonyms: as "Chester Alan Arthur" he engaged in political reportage and commentary, and as "Ethan O. Waters" he wrote deliberately provocative philosophical criticism and essays. ("Ethan O. Waters" was an anagram for "Owen Hatteras", a pseudonym used by H. L. Mencken, a writer and editor much admired by Bradford. Some of the "Waters" essays were written in collaboration with Timothy Virkkala.)

Bradford was a consequentialist who favored a pragmatic approach to libertarian philosophy, grounding his limited government beliefs in a view of individual rights as social constructs, rather than a result of natural law. This approach differentiated Bradford from many other libertarian writers, as well as Ayn Rand. Bradford, however, was extremely tolerant of differences of opinion, and often published articles and essays by those with whom he disagreed; despite being against the war machine and opposed to the Iraq War, Bradford published articles written by proponents of the war. After Bradford's death, Liberty was edited by Stephen Cox, first as a magazine and then as a website.

In later years, Bradford was noted for his published criticisms of the Libertarian Party, whom he viewed as excessively didactic and electorally ineffective. He also reported on what he viewed as financial mismanagement and cronyism by Libertarian Party officials.

In 1999, Bradford was a founding coeditor of The Journal of Ayn Rand Studies, along with Stephen Cox and Chris Matthew Sciabarra.

== Death ==
He died of kidney cancer on December 8, 2005, in Port Townsend, Washington, aged 58.
