= Plume (publisher) =

American publishing company

- Parent company: New American Library (Penguin Group)
- Founded: 1970
- Country of origin: United States
- Headquarters location: New York City
- Official website: us.penguingroup.com

Plume is a publishing company in the United States, founded in 1970 as the trade paperback imprint of New American Library. Today it is a division of Penguin Group, with a backlist of approximately 700 titles.
