= Choice (publisher) =

American publisher and review magazine

Choice: Current Reviews for Academic Libraries
- Frequency: Monthly
- Founded: 1964
- Company: Association of College and Research Libraries
- Country: United States
- Based in: Middletown, Connecticut
- Language: English
- Website: www.choice360.org
- ISSN: 0009-4978

Choice is a publishing unit of the Association of College and Research Libraries (ACRL). It includes the magazine Choice as well as other products including the Choice Reviews database. The magazine was established in 1964. It is considered the premier source for reviews of academic books, electronic media, and Internet resources of interest to those in higher education. The magazine is headquartered in Middletown, Connecticut.

== Reviews ==
Reviews are done by scholars. For a print book, they are to be no longer than 190 words, and slightly longer for internet resources.

== Scope of influence ==
Most academic libraries in the United States use Choice and/or Choice Reviews for selecting and purchasing materials.

Reviews are published monthly in Choice magazine and are added in real time to the Choice Reviews subscription database. Choice publishes approximately 500–600 reviews each month in subdisciplines spanning the humanities, science and technology, and the social and behavioral sciences.

== Outstanding Academic Titles ==
According to the American Library Association, the Outstanding Academic Titles list "reflects the best in scholarly titles... and brings with it the extraordinary recognition of the academic library community." The list is administered by the ALA's Association of College & Research Libraries (ACRL).

Every year, in its January issue, Choice chooses a selection of the books reviewed in the last year as "Outstanding Academic Titles" ("Outstanding Academic Books" until 2000). The selection covers around 10% of the roughly 7000 books reviewed annually. Most academic libraries in the United States use Choice for selecting and purchasing materials. According to the ACRL, Choice reaches 22,000 librarians and an estimated 13,000 higher education faculty in almost every undergraduate college and university library in the United States, along with many larger public libraries, and special and governmental libraries.

Reviews are published monthly in Choice magazine and Choice Reviews online. Choice publishes approximately 7,000 reviews per year in 50 subdisciplines spanning the humanities, science and technology, and the social and behavioral sciences. Selections for Outstanding Academic Titles are determined by scholars who act as experts in their respective fields of study and who do not receive payment for their reviews.
