= The Journal of Ayn Rand Studies =

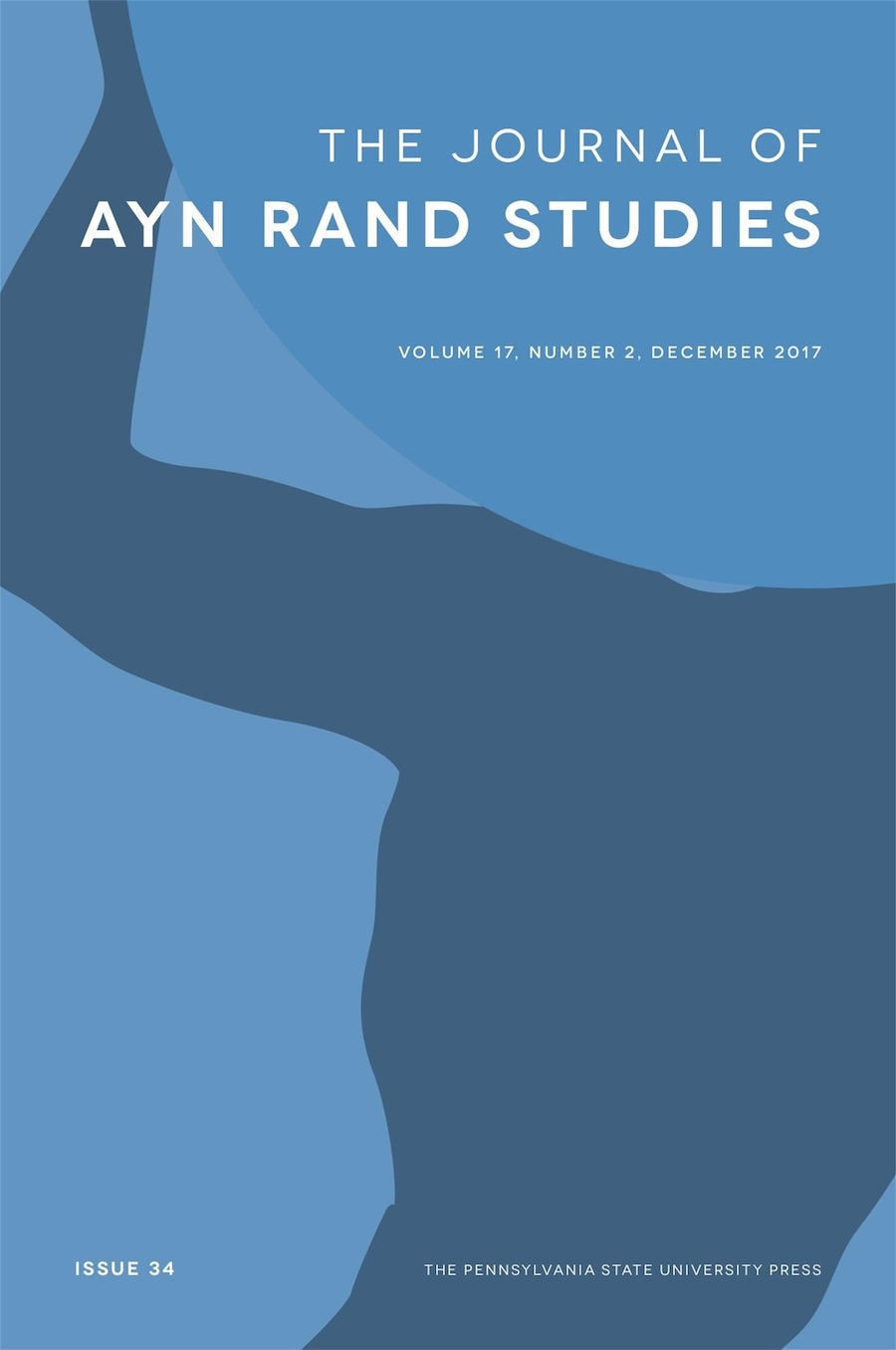
- Discipline: Philosophy; Social Theory; Social Science; Humanities
- Language: English
- Edited by: Chris Matthew Sciabarra; Stephen D. Cox; Roderick Long; Robert L. Campbell

Publication details
- History: 1999–2023
- Publisher: Penn State University Press (United States)
- Frequency: Biannual

Standard abbreviations
- ISO 4: J. Ayn Rand Stud.

Indexing
- ISSN: 1526-1018 (print); 2169-7132 (web)
- LCCN: sn99008955
- OCLC no.: 41986207

Links
- Journal homepage

The Journal of Ayn Rand Studies (JARS) was an academic journal devoted to studying "Rand and her times". Established in 1999, its founding co-editors were R. W. Bradford, Stephen D. Cox, and Chris Matthew Sciabarra. From 2013, the journal had been published by Penn State University Press until its closure in 2023.

== History ==
In 1999, R. W. Bradford, Stephen D. Cox, and Chris Matthew Sciabarra co-founded the Journal of Ayn Rand Studies. Founding co-editor Sciabarra called the journal "the only nonpartisan, interdisciplinary, double-blind, peer-reviewed, biannual periodical devoted to the study of Ayn Rand and her times". Rand was a 20th century author who developed a system of thought she called Objectivism.

In 2000, the Village Voice reported that Mimi Reisel Gladstein was another editor for the journal. In 2005, the journal dedicated its issues to commemorating the centenary of Rand's birth and featured scholarship on her legacy and influence. Starting in 2013, the Journal of Ayn Rand Studies was published by Penn State University Press.

The Journal of Ayn Rand Studies ceased publication in 2023, concluding a 23-year run.

== Approach ==
The journal published on Rand studies from a variety of perspectives. Mainstream intellectuals and academics from prestigious universities worldwide, writing without hagiography, contributed scholarship to the journal. This caused friction with the Ayn Rand Institute; journalist David Glenn reports that institute leaders considered "many of" the journal's publications "false and offensive". When Andrew Bernstein (a philosopher intellectually affiliated with the Ayn Rand Institute and a candidate for a visiting faculty position at Texas State University that would have been funded by the Anthem Foundation) contributed a brief reply to a negative review of his CliffsNotes for Ayn Rand's novels in 2002; he subsequently issued a statement apologizing for having contributed to the journal, behavior that Texas State senior philosophy lecturer Rebecca Raphael considered "a red flag", in the words of journalist Glenn, and believed departments should be cautious about accepting Anthem grants; ultimately, Texas State's philosophy department did not go forward with establishing a position with Anthem Foundation funding.
