= Stephen D. Cox =

American magazine editor (1948–2024)

- Born: January 12, 1948; Michigan, U.S.
- Died: September 6, 2024 (aged 76)

Academic background
- Education: University of Michigan (BA); University of California, Los Angeles (PhD)

Academic work
- Institutions: University of California, San Diego

Stephen D. Cox (January 12, 1948 – September 6, 2024) was an author, literature and humanities professor, and libertarian commentator.

He was the editor of Liberty magazine, an American online libertarian and classical liberal review. Cox was a longtime professor of literature at the University of California, San Diego, and the author of several non-fiction books.

== Career ==
After receiving his PhD from the University of California, Los Angeles, Cox joined the faculty of UC San Diego in 1976.

He was an associate editor of Liberty when the magazine began publishing in 1987. He was named as senior editor as of the March 1989 issue. Cox took over as editor-in-chief of the publication following the death of its founder and longtime editor and publisher, R. W. Bradford, in December 2005. In addition to editing duties, he wrote articles and commentary for the magazine. This included his monthly "WordWatch" column, in which he commented on how language and semantics influence culture and political discourse.

== Reception ==
Publishers Weekly called his 2009 book The Big House: Image and Reality of the American Prison "detailed and vivid". In The Historian, Matthew J. Mancini said Cox provided "a jolt of nonpartisan realism" about the prison as a cultural institution, but faulted him for not including discussion of modern novels about prison life. The book was also reviewed in Choice and The Chronicle of Higher Education.

His 2014 book American Christianity: The Continuing Revolution was described by Library Journal as a "fascinating, pleasurable read". In Church History, Barry Hankins called it "provocative" with "some highly insightful observations about the ironies of American Christianity". The book was also reviewed in Choice, Kirkus Reviews, and Touchstone.

== Background and personal life ==
On his website, Cox wrote that he was from rural Michigan. He received his BA degree from the University of Michigan.

== Selected works ==
- "The Stranger Within Thee": Concepts of the Self in Late-Eighteenth-Century Literature. Pittsburgh, Pennsylvania: University of Pittsburgh Press. 1980. ISBN 978-0-8229-3424-0.
- Love and Logic: The Evolution of Blake's Thought. Ann Arbor, Michigan: University of Michigan Press. 1992. ISBN 978-0-472-10304-1.
- The Titanic Story: Hard Choices, Dangerous Decisions. Chicago: Open Court. 1999. ISBN 978-0-8126-9396-6.
- The Woman and the Dynamo: Isabel Paterson and the Idea of America. New Brunswick, New Jersey: Transaction Publishers. 2004. ISBN 978-0-7658-0241-5.
- The New Testament and Literature: A Guide to Literary Patterns. Chicago: Open Court. 2006. ISBN 978-0-8126-9591-5.
- The Big House: Image and Reality of the American Prison. New Haven: Yale University Press. 2009. ISBN 978-0-300-21508-3.
- American Christianity: The Continuing Revolution. Austin: University of Texas Press. 2014. ISBN 978-0-292-72910-0.
- Culture and Liberty: The Writings of Isabel Paterson. New Brunswick, N.J.: Transaction Publishers. 2015. ISBN 978-1412856003.
