= Liberty (libertarian magazine) =

American libertarian journal

- July 2010 issue of Liberty
- Categories: Public policy, libertarianism
- Frequency: Bi-monthly, 1987–1998; Monthly, 1999–2010; Online only, November 2010 forward
- Founded: 1987
- Country: United States
- Based in: Port Townsend, Washington
- Language: English
- Website: libertyunbound.com
- ISSN: 0894-1408

Liberty is an American libertarian journal founded in 1987 by R. W. Bradford (who was the magazine's publisher and editor until he died from cancer in 2005) in Port Townsend, Washington, and then edited from San Diego by Stephen Cox. Unlike Reason, which is printed on glossy paper and has full-color photographs, Liberty was printed on uncoated paper stock and had line drawing cartoons by S. H. "Scott" Chambers and Rex F. "Baloo" May, no photographs except for advertisements, and only one extra color (blue), which was limited to the cover and occasionally a few ads. Beginning in November 2010, the magazine transitioned to an online-only format.

== History ==
Bradford had planned the launch of Liberty for several years during the 1980s, waiting in part for the development of desktop publishing software to make the endeavor cost-effective for a short-run periodical. The magazine achieved Bradford's target circulation by the end of the first year of publication. Starting it as an arm of his private publishing business, he turned the magazine over to a 501(c)(3) non-profit corporation (under his control) in 1993. Until late 1998, Liberty published bimonthly. In 1999, it moved from a bimonthly to a monthly publication schedule. Beginning in 2008, the print version was published eleven times a year, with one issue being a double issue. Beginning in November 2010, the magazine transitioned to an online-only format that does not arrange content into separate monthly or bimonthly issues.

The magazine's list of editors at start-up included Murray Rothbard; Karl Hess joined soon after. Both wrote for the magazine and both were featured prominently in subscription advertising. Rothbard left the masthead in 1990, following his break with the Libertarian Party and his public move towards paleolibertarianism; Hess stayed with the magazine until his death.

From the beginning, Liberty gave extensive coverage to the history of the libertarian movement, repeatedly focusing on the biography and legacy of Ayn Rand. The magazine offered the first printing of Rothbard's pamphlet The Sociology of the Ayn Rand Cult as its first subscription bonus. John Hospers's two-part series "Talking With Ayn Rand" was among the magazine's notable early publishing coups. Characteristically, Bradford juxtaposed scholarly, intellectual writing from philosophers such as Loren Lomasky and Jan Narveson and economists such as Mark Skousen, Doug Casey, Leland B. Yeager, and David D. Friedman, with work by young, virtually unknown amateur writers. With few exceptions, the magazine does not pay writers for their contributions.

== Contributors and editors ==
Regular contributors include:

- Dave Kopel, research director for the Independence Institute
- Wendy McElroy, editor of the Individualist Feminist
- William E. Merritt, senior fellow of the Burr Institute
- Bruce Ramsey, journalist
- Timothy Sandefur, College of Public Interest Law fellow at the Pacific Legal Foundation
- Jane S. Shaw, president of the John William Pope Center for Higher Education Policy
- Tim Slagle, stand-up comedian
- David Weigel, journalist for Reason, Money, and Campaigns and Elections
- Leland B. Yeager, Ludwig von Mises distinguished Professor Emeritus of Economics at Auburn University

Contributing editors include:

- David Boaz
- Alan Bock
- Gene Healy
- Bart Kosko
- Richard Kostelanetz
- Durk Pearson
- Sandy Shaw

== Departments ==
- Reflections: short, often satirical articles
- Terra Incognita: strange world news
