= Chris Matthew Sciabarra =

American activist

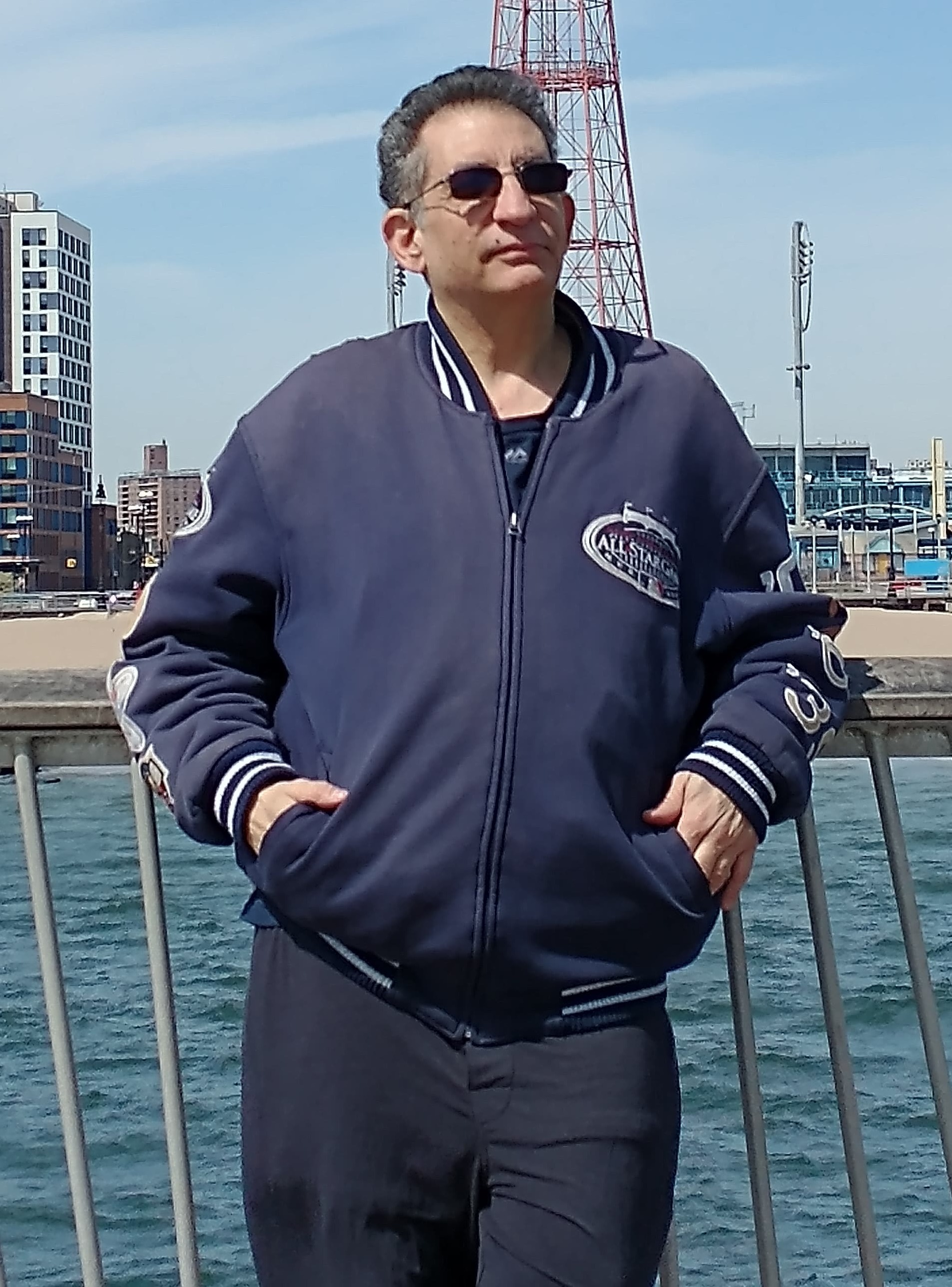
- Born: February 17, 1960 (age 66); New York City, U.S.
- Education: John Dewey High School; New York University (BA, MA, PhD)
- Occupation: Political theorist

Chris Matthew Sciabarra (born February 17, 1960) is an American political theorist born and based in Brooklyn, New York. He is the author of three scholarly books—Marx, Hayek, and Utopia; Ayn Rand: The Russian Radical; and Total Freedom: Toward a Dialectical Libertarianism—as well as several shorter works. He is also the co-editor, with Mimi Reisel Gladstein, of Feminist Interpretations of Ayn Rand and co-editor with Roger E. Bissell and Edward W. Younkins of The Dialectics of Liberty: Exploring the Context of Human Freedom. His work has focused on topics including Objectivism, libertarianism (particularly the work of Friedrich Hayek and Murray Rothbard), and dialectics.

== Life ==
Sciabarra was a graduate of John Dewey High School before moving onto New York University. He earned his BA in History (with honors), Politics, and Economics in 1981; his MA in Politics in 1983; and his PhD in Political Philosophy, Theory, and Methodology in 1988, under the supervision of Bertell Ollman. He was a Visiting Scholar in the NYU Department of Politics from 1989 to 2009. In 1999 he became the co-founder and co-editor of the biannual Journal of Ayn Rand Studies, which has been published by Penn State University Press since 2013, and belonged to Liberty and Power, a group weblog at the History News Network. The journal completed its two-plus decade run in 2023.

He is the author of a trilogy of books on dialectics and libertarianism. The second of these, published in 1995, is Ayn Rand: The Russian Radical, which explores Ayn Rand's college influences and intellectual roots—particularly the role of Rand's philosophy teacher, philosopher Nicholas Onufrievich Lossky—and argued that Rand's philosophical method was dialectical in nature. In 2013, Pennsylvania State University Press published a second expanded edition of Ayn Rand: The Russian Radical, which includes a new preface, three new appendices (Appendices I and II are "The Rand Transcript" and "The Rand Transcript, Revisited," first published in The Journal of Ayn Rand Studies, and Appendix III constitutes a response to Shoshana Milgram, a recent critic of Sciabarra's historical work. The expanded second edition also includes an expanded section in Chapter XII, "The Predatory State," entitled "The Welfare-Warfare State," which explores Rand's radical critique of US foreign policy.) For a comparison of the two editions see the links on his Notablog. "The Rand Transcript Revealed", co-authored by Sciabarra and Pavel Solovyev, was published in December 2021 in The Journal of Ayn Rand Studies, and constitutes the author's most extensive exploration of Rand's education.

Sciabarra is openly gay. He is of Sicilian and Greek ancestry. He has also talked openly about living with disability.

== Reviews of Ayn Rand: The Russian Radical ==
David M. Brown writes: "Much to my surprise the author of Ayn Rand: The Russian Radical, a comprehensive new study of Rand's thought and its genesis in Russian culture, has persuaded me that something called 'dialectics' is integral to Ayn Rand's philosophic approach and crucial to its success. Russian Radical is a different kind of look at Ayn Rand, a full-fledged 'hermeneutic' on the contours, development, and interpretation of her thought."

According to Lester H. Hunt: "It is indicative of the interest of this book that I have so far engaged in an argument with it instead of saying how good I think it is on the whole. Among other things, it is an excellent synthesis of the Objectivist literature, both the works of Rand and those of her immediate successors. Sciabarra's mastery of enormous amounts of material is almost literally incredible. He also manages to break entirely new ground on several different issues."

While James G. Lennox thoroughly rejects the author's historical conclusions, and he recommends against construing Rand's method of challenging dichotomies or "false alternatives" as "dialectical," he also writes, "[i]ts author has an encyclopedic familiarity with the writings of Ayn Rand and with virtually everyone who has advocated, commented on, or written critically about Objectivism. [...]. He is the first of her commentators to explore the intellectual milieu of Rand's early, formative years, providing a deeper appreciation for her occasional scathing remarks about Russian culture as she had experienced it. All of this material is discussed, and exhaustively referenced, in the interests of providing a comprehensive analysis of Objectivism, not merely as a philosophical system, but as a philosophical and cultural movement."

John Ridpath, a director of the Ayn Rand Institute, has argued that The Russian Radical is postmodern and deconstructionist in its overall orientation, that it is a "worthless product" of contemporary academia, and that on the whole it was "preposterous in its thesis, destructive in its purpose, and tortuously numbing in its content."

== Bibliography ==
=== Dialectics and Liberty trilogy ===
- Marx, Hayek, and Utopia. Philosophy of the Social Sciences. Albany, New York: State University of New York Press. 1995. ISBN 0-7914-2615-7.
- Ayn Rand: The Russian Radical. University Park, Pennsylvania: Pennsylvania State University Press. 1995. ISBN 0-271-01440-7. OCLC 31133644.
- Total Freedom: Toward a Dialectical Libertarianism. University Park, Pennsylvania: Pennsylvania State University Press. 2000. ISBN 0-271-02048-2.

=== Edited works ===
- With Mimi Reisel Gladstein. Feminist Interpretations of Ayn Rand. Re-reading the Canon. University Park, Pennsylvania: Pennsylvania State University Press. 1999. ISBN 0-271-01830-5.
- With Roger E. Bissell and Edward W. Younkins. The Dialectics of Liberty: Exploring the Context of Human Freedom. Capitalist Thought: Studies in Philosophy, Politics, and Economics. Lanham, Maryland: Lexington Books. 2019. ISBN 978-1-498-59209-3.

=== Monographs ===
- Ayn Rand, Homosexuality, and Human Liberation. Cape Town, South Africa: Leap Publishing. 2003. ISBN 0-9584573-3-6.
- Ayn Rand: Her Life and Thought. Poughkeepsie, New York: The Atlas Society. 1996. ISBN 1-57724-031-6.
- Labor History Revisionism: A Libertarian Analysis of the Pullman Strike. London: Libertarian Alliance. 2003.
- Government and the Railroads During World War I: Political Capitalism and the Death of Enterprise. London: Libertarian Alliance. 2003.

=== Dissertation ===
- Toward a Radical Critique of Utopianism (1988)
