= Mimi Reisel Gladstein =

American academic (born 1936)

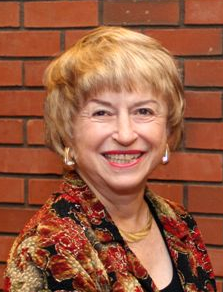
- Born: 1936; Nicaragua
- Other names: Miriam Reisel
- Education: Oklahoma University; University of New Mexico (Ph.D.)
- Occupations: Professor of English and Theatre Arts
- Employer: University of Texas at El Paso

Mimi Reisel Gladstein (born 1936) is a professor of English and Theatre Arts at the University of Texas at El Paso. Her specialties include authors such as Ayn Rand and John Steinbeck, as well as women's studies, theatre arts and 18th-century British literature. In 2011 she was named to the El Paso Historical Hall of Honor.

== Life and scholarship ==
Gladstein was born in Nicaragua and moved with her family to the United States at an early age. She grew up in Las Cruces, New Mexico and El Paso, Texas, and became a US citizen at the age of 19. She obtained a PhD in Contemporary American Literature from the University of New Mexico. She is married and has three children.

She was a pioneer in the field of women's studies, teaching a class on "Women and Literature" in the early 1970s. In an attempt to provide students with an example of a successful female character in literature, she began assigning Ayn Rand's Atlas Shrugged for her class. This led her to write one of the earliest academic articles about Rand as a literary figure, "Ayn Rand and Feminism: An Unlikely Alliance", which was published in 1978 in the journal College English. She later wrote or edited several other works about Rand, including The Ayn Rand Companion and Feminist Interpretations of Ayn Rand. When Gladstein began work on The Ayn Rand Companion, she sent Rand a request for an interview. The reply was a letter from Rand's attorney threatening to sue Gladstein for violation of Rand's copyrights if she proceeded with the book, a response that Gladstein found "bizarre".

In 1986, Gladstein published The Indestructible Woman in Faulkner, Hemingway, and Steinbeck. Her work related to Steinbeck has won multiple awards. She received the John J. and Angeline Pruis Award for Steinbeck Teacher of the Decade (1978–1987), and in 1996 she received the Burkhardt Award for Outstanding Contributions to Steinbeck Studies.

In addition to her scholarly work, Gladstein has held a number of administrative positions at the University of Texas at El Paso. She was the first director of the Women's Studies Program, director of the Western Cultural Heritage Program, and executive director for the university's Diamond Jubilee Celebration. She was twice the chair of the English Department, and later chaired the Department of Theatre, Dance and Film. She also served as Associate Dean of Liberal Arts.

Gladstein has served as president of both the Rocky Mountain Modern Language Association and the South Central Society for Eighteenth Century Studies.

== Awards and honors ==
In addition to the two awards for her work on Steinbeck, Gladstein also received the Burlington Northern Award for Teaching Excellence, and in 2003 the University of Texas at El Paso gave her the College of Liberal Arts' Outstanding Faculty Achievement Award. The Last Supper of Chicano Heroes won a 2009 Latino Book Award: 2nd place for Best Biography in English.

Glastein has twice received grants from the Fulbright Program. She was a Fulbright Professor in Caracas, Venezuela in 1990–91, and in 1995 she taught at the Complutense University of Madrid as a Senior Fulbright Scholar.

== Selected bibliography ==
- Gladstein, Mimi R. (February 1978). "Ayn Rand and Feminism: An Unlikely Alliance". College English. 39 (6): 25–30. doi:10.2307/375869. JSTOR 375869.
- The Ayn Rand Companion. Westport, Connecticut: Greenwood Press. 1984. ISBN 0-313-22079-4.
- The Indestructible Woman in Faulkner, Hemingway, and Steinbeck. Ann Arbor, Michigan: UMI Research Press. 1986. ISBN 0-8357-1662-7.
- "The Grapes of Wrath: Steinbeck and the Eternal Immigrant" in Hayashi, Tetsumaro, ed. (1993). John Steinbeck: The Years of Greatness, 1936–1939. Tuscaloosa, Alabama: University of Alabama Press. pp. 132–144. ISBN 0-8173-0692-7.
- The New Ayn Rand Companion. Westport, Connecticut: Greenwood Press. 1999. ISBN 0-313-30321-5. OCLC 40359365.
- Feminist Interpretations of Ayn Rand. Re-reading the Canon. Co-edited with Chris Matthew Sciabarra. University Park, Pennsylvania: Pennsylvania State University Press. 1999. ISBN 0-271-01830-5.
- Atlas Shrugged: Manifesto of the Mind. Twayne's Masterwork Studies. New York: Twayne Publishers. 2000. ISBN 0-8057-1638-6.
- "Breakthroughs in Ayn Rand Literary Criticism" in Thomas, William, ed. (2005). The Literary Art of Ayn Rand. Poughkeepsie, New York: The Objectivist Center. pp. 57–74. ISBN 1-57724-070-7.
- "Ayn Rand's Cinematic Eye" in Younkins, Edward W., ed. (2007). Ayn Rand's Atlas Shrugged: A Philosophical and Literary Companion. Burlington, Vermont: Ashgate Publishing. pp. 109–120. ISBN 978-0-7546-5533-6.
- The Last Supper of Chicano Heroes: Selected Works of José Antonio Burciaga. Co-edited with Daniel Chacón. Tucson, Arizona: University of Arizona Press. 2008. ISBN 978-0-8165-2661-1.
- The Women of Smeltertown. Co-authored with Marcia Hatfield Daudistel, Carol Eastman, Yolanda Chavez-Leyva and Howard Campbell. Fort Worth, Texas: TCU Press. 2018. ISBN 9780875657004.
