= Atlas Shrugged =

1957 novel by Ayn Rand

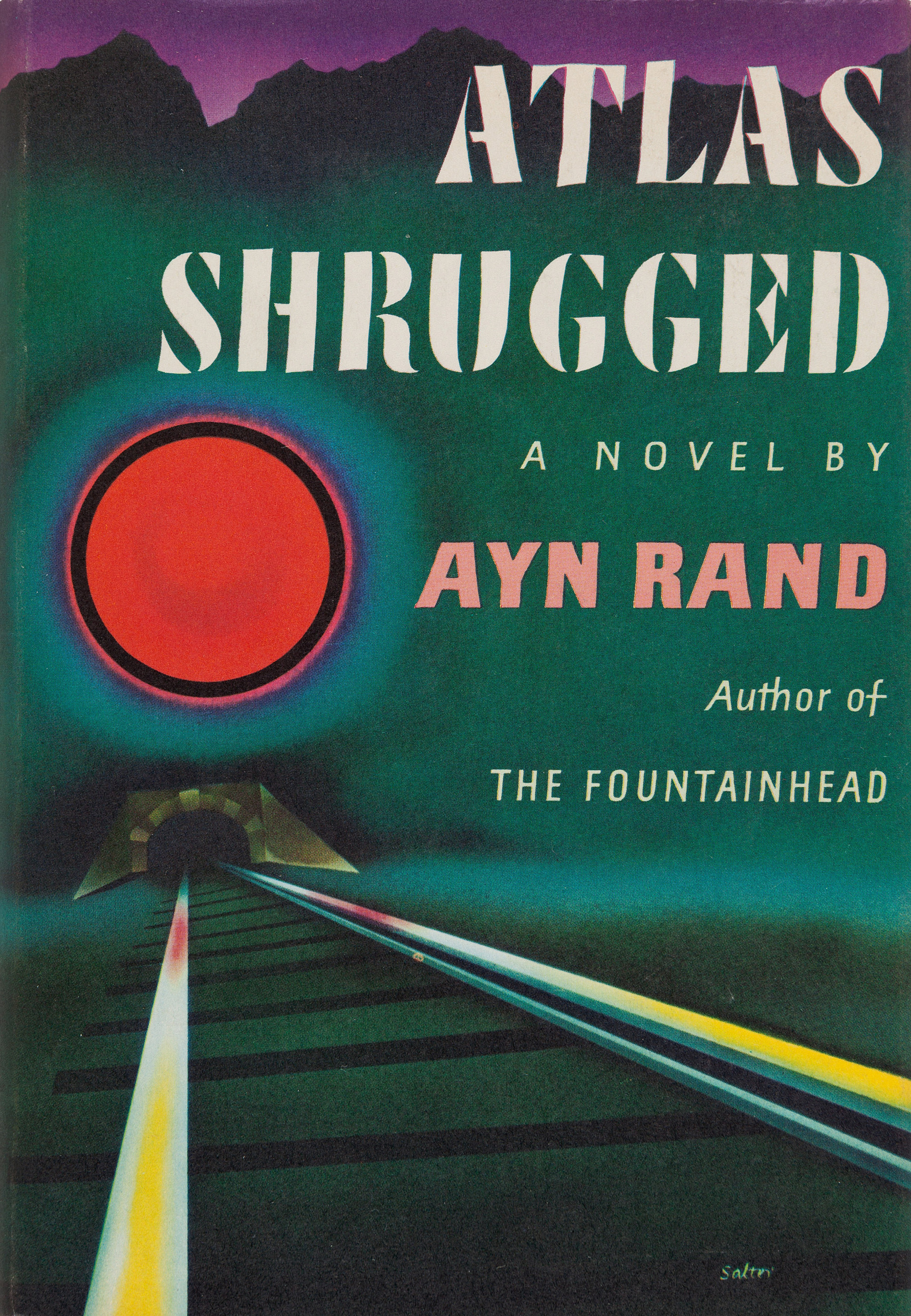
- First edition
- Author: Ayn Rand
- Language: English
- Genre: Philosophical fiction; Libertarian science fiction; Mystery fiction; Romance novel
- Published: October 10, 1957
- Publisher: Random House
- Publication place: United States
- Pages: 1,168 (first edition)
- Awards: Prometheus Award – Hall of Fame; 1983
- OCLC: 412355486

Atlas Shrugged is a 1957 novel by Ayn Rand. It is her longest novel, the fourth and final one published during her lifetime, and the one she considered her magnum opus in the realm of fiction writing. She described the theme of Atlas Shrugged as "the role of man's mind in existence" and it includes elements of science fiction, mystery, and romance. The book explores a number of philosophical themes from which Rand would subsequently develop Objectivism, including reason, property rights, individualism, rational egoism, and laissez-faire capitalism and depicts what Rand saw as the evil of altruism and governmental coercion. Of Rand's works of fiction, it contains her most extensive statement of her philosophical system.

The book depicts a dystopian United States in which heavy industry companies suffer under increasingly burdensome laws and regulations. Railroad executive Dagny Taggart and her lover, steel magnate Hank Rearden, struggle against "looters" who want to exploit their productivity. They discover that a mysterious figure called John Galt is persuading other business leaders to abandon their companies and disappear as a strike of productive individuals against the looters. The novel ends with the strikers planning to build a new capitalist society based on Galt's philosophy.

Atlas Shrugged received largely negative reviews, but achieved enduring popularity and ongoing sales in the following decades. The novel has been cited as an influence on a variety of libertarian and conservative thinkers and politicians. After several unsuccessful attempts to adapt the novel for film or television, a film trilogy was released from 2011 to 2014 to negative reviews; two theatrical adaptations have also been staged.

== Synopsis ==
=== Setting ===
Atlas Shrugged is set in a dystopian United States at an unspecified time, in which the country has a "national legislature" instead of Congress and a "head of state" instead of a president. The United States appears to be approaching an economic collapse, with widespread shortages, business failures, and decreased productivity. Writer Edward Younkins said, "The story may be simultaneously described as anachronistic and timeless. The pattern of industrial organization appears to be that of the late 1800s—the mood seems to be close to that of the depression-era 1930s. Both the social customs and the level of technology remind one of the 1950s".

Many early 20th-century technologies are available, but later technologies such as jet planes and computers are largely absent. There is very little mention of historical people or events, not even major events such as World War II. Aside from the United States, most countries are referred to as "People's States" that are implied to be either socialist or communist.

=== Plot ===
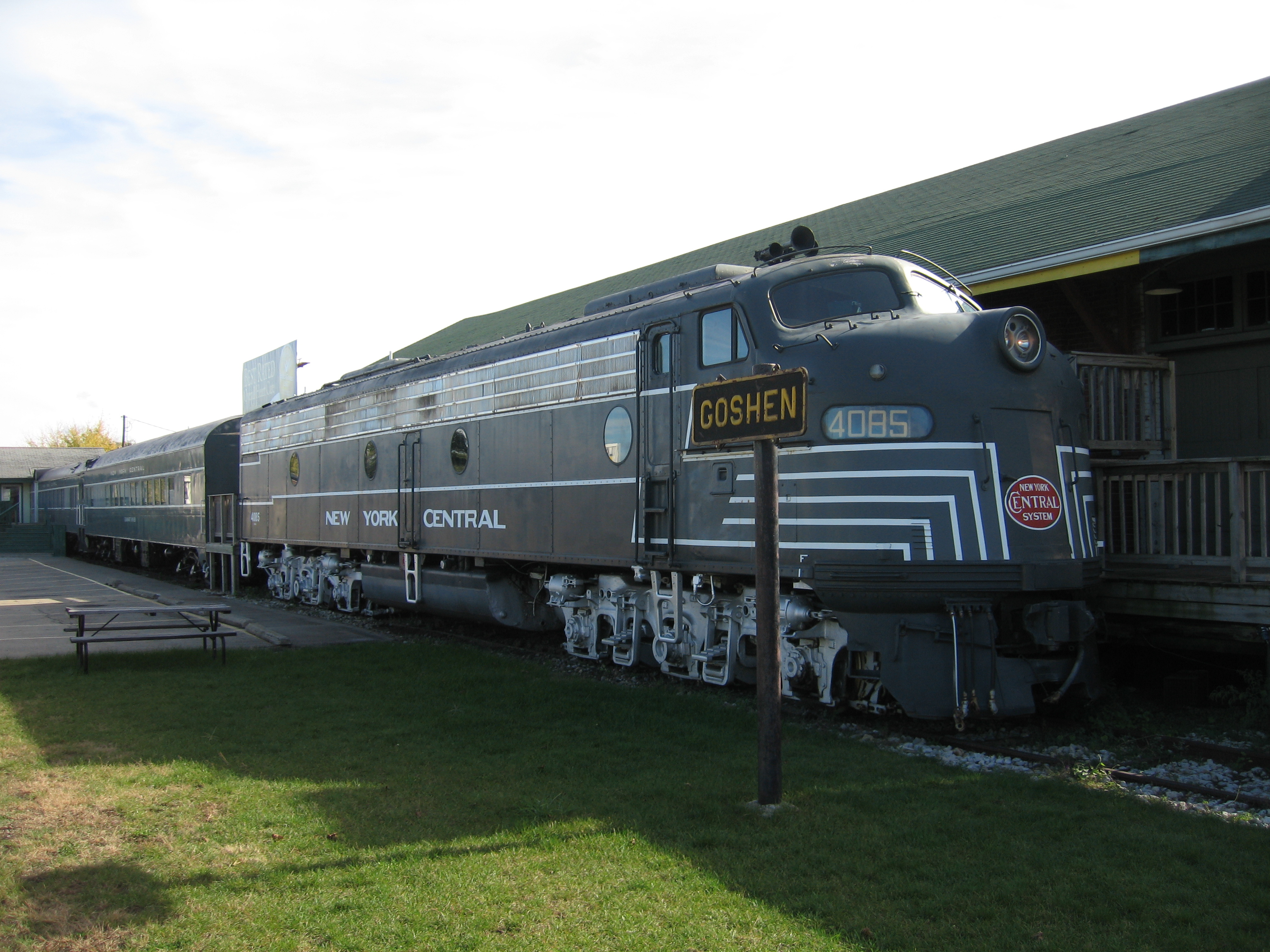
Rand studied operations of the New York Central Railroad as research for the story.

Dagny Taggart, the operating vice-president of Taggart Transcontinental Railroad, keeps the company going amid a sustained economic depression. As economic conditions worsen and government enforces statist controls on successful businesses, people repeat the cryptic phrase "Who is John Galt?" which means: "Don't ask questions nobody can answer."

Her brother Jim, the railroad's president, seems to make irrational decisions, such as buying from Orren Boyle's unreliable Associated Steel. Dagny is also disappointed to discover that the Argentine billionaire Francisco d'Anconia, her childhood friend and first love, is risking his family's copper company by constructing the San Sebastián copper mines, even though Mexico will probably nationalize them.

Despite the risk, Jim and Boyle invest heavily in a railway for the region while ignoring the Rio Norte Line in Colorado, where entrepreneur Ellis Wyatt has discovered large oil reserves. Mexico nationalizes the mines and railroad line, but the mines are discovered to be worthless. To recoup the railroad's losses, Jim influences the National Alliance of Railroads to prohibit competition in prosperous areas such as Colorado. Wyatt demands that Dagny supply adequate rails to his wells before the ruling takes effect.

In Philadelphia, self-made steel magnate Hank Rearden develops Rearden Metal, an alloy lighter and stronger than conventional steel. Dagny opts to use Rearden Metal in the Rio Norte Line, becoming the first major customer for the product. After Hank refuses to sell the metal to the State Science Institute, a government research foundation run by Dr. Robert Stadler, the Institute publishes a report condemning the metal without identifying problems with it. As a result, many significant organizations boycott the line. Although Stadler agrees with Dagny's complaints about the unscientific tone of the report, he refuses to override it. To protect Taggart Transcontinental from the boycott, Dagny decides to build the Rio Norte Line as an independent company named the John Galt Line.

Hank is unhappy with his manipulative wife Lillian, but feels obliged to stay with her. He is attracted to Dagny, and when he joins her for the inauguration of the John Galt Line, they become lovers. On a vacation, Hank and Dagny discover an abandoned factory with an incomplete but revolutionary motor that runs on atmospheric static electricity. They begin searching for the inventor, and Dagny hires scientist Quentin Daniels to reconstruct the motor; however, a series of economically harmful directives are issued by Wesley Mouch, a former Rearden lobbyist who betrayed Hank in return for a job leading a government agency. Wyatt and other important business leaders quit and disappear, leaving their industries to failure.

Dagny and Hank realize that Francisco is hurting his copper company intentionally, although they do not understand why. When the government imposes a directive that forbids employees from leaving their jobs and nationalizes all patents, Dagny violates the law by resigning in protest. To gain Hank's compliance, the government blackmails him with threats to publicize his affair with Dagny. After a major disaster in one of Taggart Transcontinental's tunnels, Dagny returns to work. On her return, she receives notice that Quentin Daniels is also quitting in protest and she rushes across the country to convince him to stay.

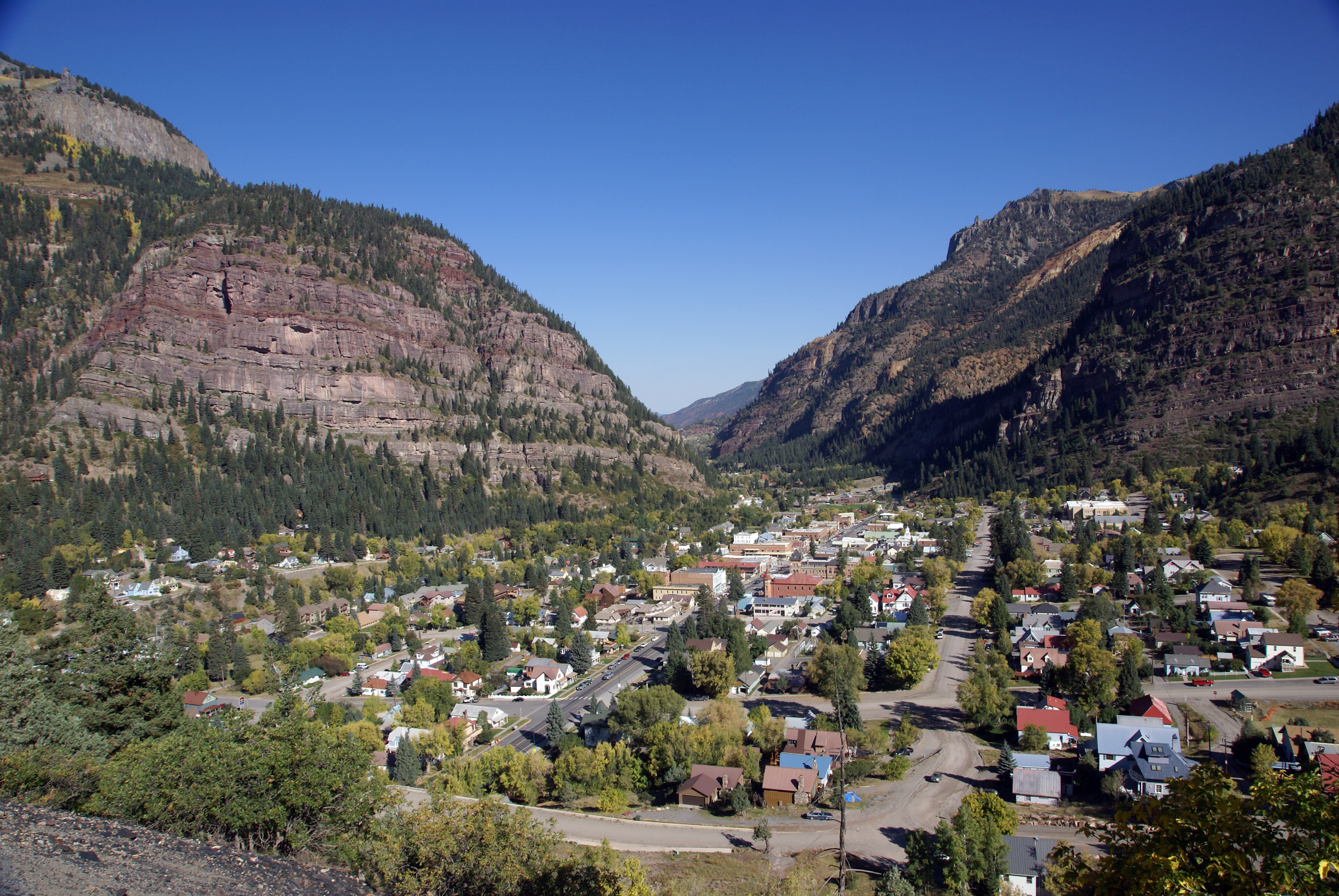
Ouray, Colorado, was the basis for Rand's descriptions of Galt's Gulch.

On her way to Daniels, Dagny meets a hobo with a story that reveals the motor was invented and abandoned by an engineer named John Galt, who is the inspiration for the common saying. When she chases after Daniels in a private plane, she crashes and discovers the secret behind the disappearances of business leaders: Galt is leading a strike of "the men of the mind". She has crashed in their hiding place, an isolated valley known as Galt's Gulch. As she recovers from her injuries, the strikers explain their motives, and she learns that the strikers include Francisco and many prominent people, such as her favorite composer, Richard Halley, and infamous pirate Ragnar Danneskjöld. Dagny falls in love with Galt, who asks her to join the strike.

Reluctant to abandon her railroad, Dagny leaves Galt's Gulch, but finds the government has devolved into dictatorship. Francisco finishes sabotaging his mines and quits. After he helps stop an armed takeover of Hank's steel mill, Francisco convinces Hank to join the strike. Galt follows Dagny to New York, where he hacks into a national radio broadcast to deliver a three-hour speech that explains the novel's theme and Rand's Objectivism.

The authorities capture Galt and unsuccessfully attempt to persuade him to lead the restoration of the country's economy. Jim then decides to torture Galt, but becomes delirious after witnessing how the authorities are too incompetent to even fix the torture device. Dagny rescues Galt, the government collapses, and the novel closes as Galt announces that the strikers can rejoin the world.

== History ==
=== Context and writing ===
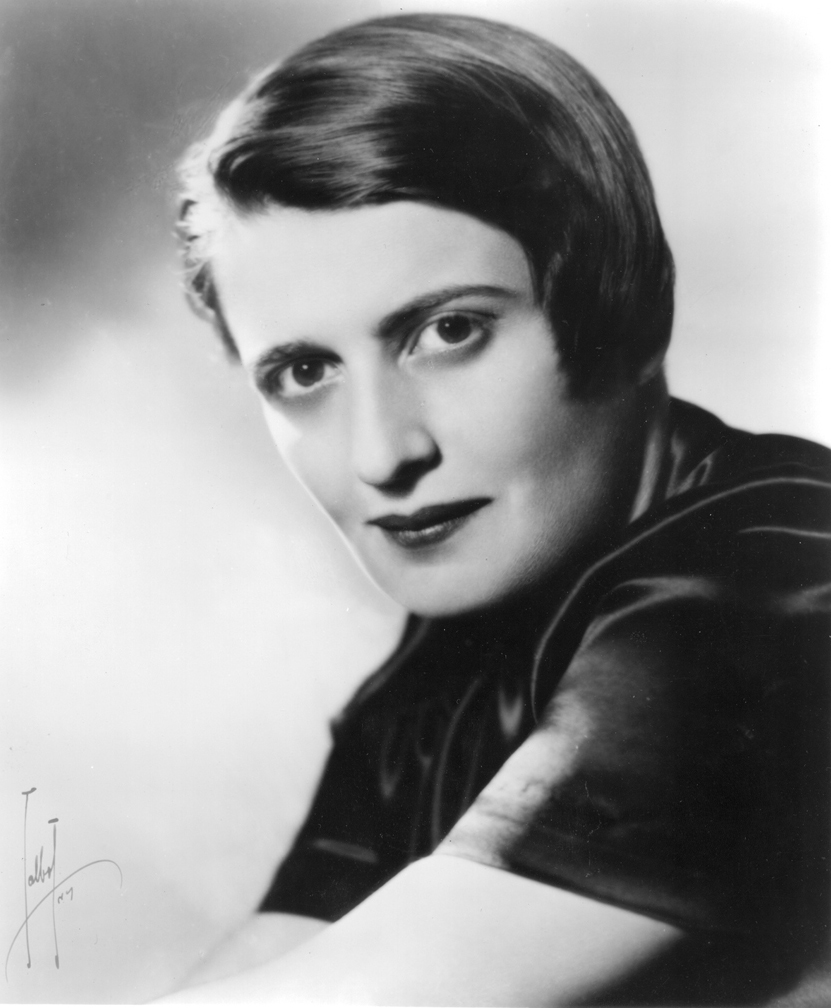
Ayn Rand in 1943

Rand's stated goal for writing the novel was "to show how desperately the world needs prime movers and how viciously it treats them" and to portray "what happens to the world without them". The core idea for the book came to her during a 1943 telephone conversation with her friend Isabel Paterson, who asserted that Rand owed it to her readers to write fiction about her philosophy. Rand disagreed and replied, "What if I went on strike? What if all the creative minds of the world went on strike? ... That would make a good novel". After the conversation ended, Rand's husband Frank O'Connor, who had overheard, affirmed to Rand, "That would make a good novel." Rand then began Atlas Shrugged to depict the morality of rational self-interest, by exploring the consequences of a strike by intellectuals refusing to supply their inventions, art, business leadership, scientific research, or new ideas to the rest of the world.

Rand began the first draft of the novel on September 2, 1946. She initially thought it would be easy to write and complete quickly; however, as she considered the complexity of the philosophical issues she wanted to address, she realized it would take longer. After ending a contract to write screenplays for Hal Wallis and finishing her obligations for the film adaptation of The Fountainhead, Rand worked full-time on the novel that she tentatively titled The Strike. By the summer of 1950, she had written 18 chapters; by September 1951, she had written 21 chapters and was working on the last of the novel's three sections.

As Rand completed new chapters, she read them to a circle of young admirers who had begun gathering at her home to discuss philosophy. This group included Nathaniel Branden, his wife Barbara Branden, Barbara's cousin Leonard Peikoff, and economist Alan Greenspan. Progress on the novel slowed considerably in 1953, when Rand began working on Galt's lengthy radio address. She spent more than two years completing the speech, finishing it on October 13, 1955. The remaining chapters proceeded more quickly; by November 1956, Rand was ready to submit the almost-completed manuscript to publishers. Atlas Shrugged was Rand's last completed work of fiction. It marked a turning point in her life—the end of her career as a novelist and the beginning of her role as a popular philosopher.

=== Influences ===
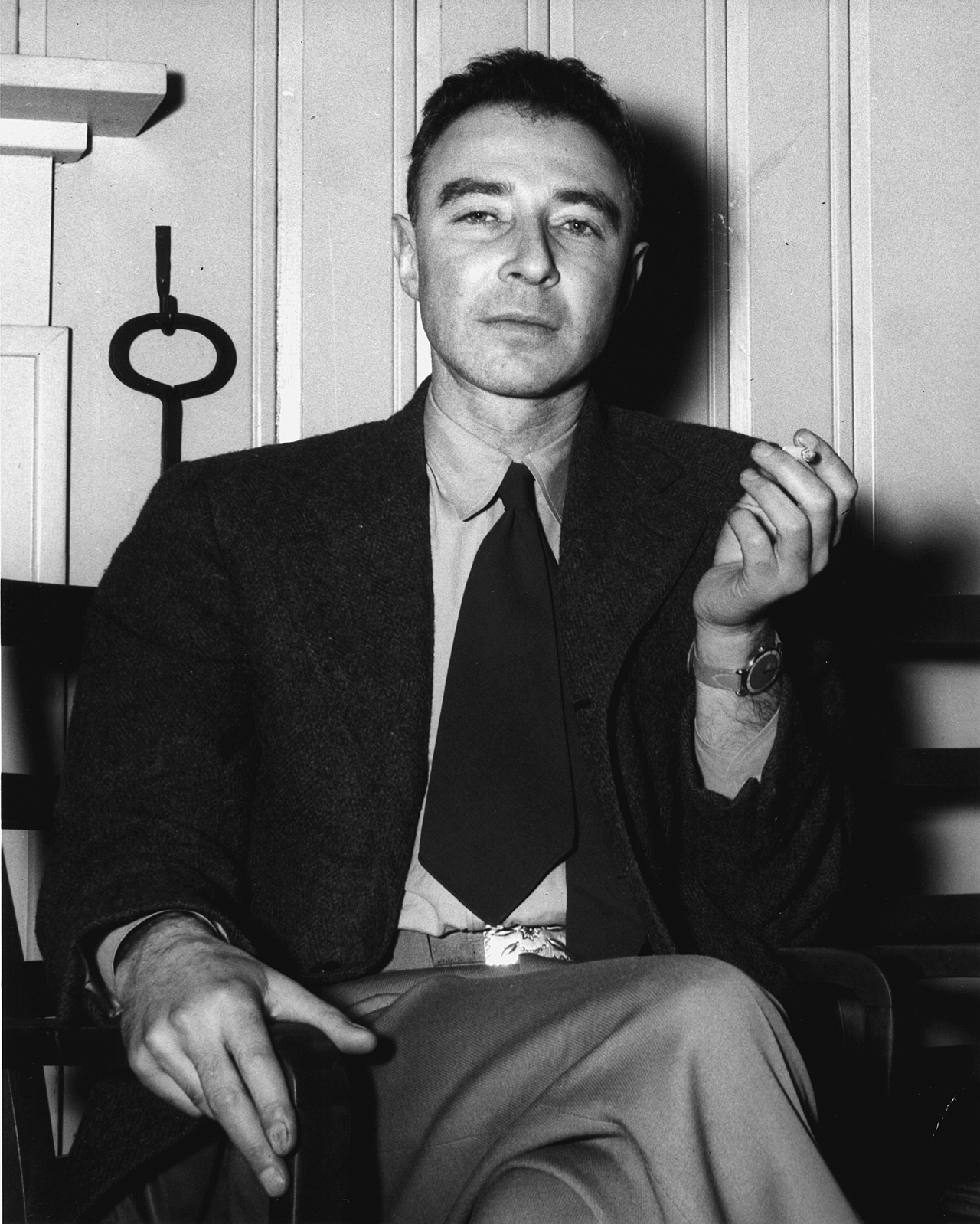
Rand used interviews with scientist J. Robert Oppenheimer for the character Robert Stadler.

Rand biographer Anne Heller traces some ideas that would go into Atlas Shrugged back to a never-written novel that Rand outlined when she was a student at Petrograd State University. The futuristic story featured an American heiress luring the most talented men away from a mostly communist Europe. The heiress would have had an assistant called Eddie Willers, the name of Dagny's assistant in Atlas Shrugged.

To depict the industrial setting of Atlas Shrugged, Rand conducted research on the American railroad and steel industries. She toured and inspected a number of industrial facilities, such as the Kaiser Steel plant, visited facilities of the New York Central Railroad, and briefly operated a locomotive on the Twentieth Century Limited. Rand also used her previous research for an uncompleted screenplay about the development of the atomic bomb, including her interviews of J. Robert Oppenheimer, which influenced the character Robert Stadler and the novel's depiction of the development of "Project X".

Rand's descriptions of Galt's Gulch were based on the town of Ouray, Colorado, which Rand and her husband visited in 1951 when they were relocating from Los Angeles to New York. Other details of the novel were affected by the experiences and comments of her friends. For example, her portrayal of leftist intellectuals (such as the characters Balph Eubank and Simon Pritchett) was influenced by the college experiences of Nathaniel and Barbara Branden, and Alan Greenspan provided information on the economics of the steel industry.

American libertarian writer Justin Raimondo described similarities between Atlas Shrugged and Garet Garrett's 1922 novel The Driver, which is about an idealized industrialist named Henry Galt, who is a transcontinental railway owner trying to improve the world and fighting against government and socialism. Raimondo believed the earlier novel influenced Rand's writing in ways she failed to acknowledge, although there was no "word-for-word plagiarism" and The Driver was published four years before Rand emigrated to the United States. Journalist Jeff Walker echoed Raimondo's comparisons in his book The Ayn Rand Cult and listed The Driver as one of several unacknowledged precursors to Atlas Shrugged. In contrast, Chris Matthew Sciabarra said he "could not find any evidence to link Rand to Garrett", and considered Raimondo's claims to be "unsupported". Liberty magazine editor R. W. Bradford said Raimondo made an unconvincing comparison based on a coincidence of names and common literary devices.

=== Publishing history ===
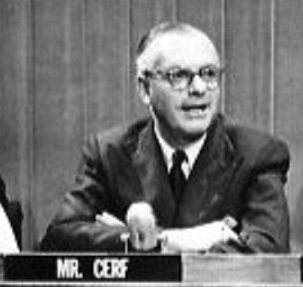
Random House CEO Bennett Cerf oversaw the novel's publication in 1957.

Due to the success of Rand's 1943 novel The Fountainhead, she had no trouble attracting a publisher for Atlas Shrugged. This was a contrast to her previous novels, which she had struggled to place. Even before she began writing it, she had been approached by publishers interested in her next novel. However, her contract for The Fountainhead gave the first option to its publisher, Bobbs-Merrill Company. After reviewing a partial manuscript, they asked her to discuss cuts and other changes. She refused, and Bobbs-Merrill rejected the book.

Hiram Hayden, an editor she liked who had left Bobbs-Merrill, asked her to consider his new employer, Random House. In an early discussion about the difficulties of publishing a controversial novel, Random House president Bennett Cerf proposed that Rand should submit the manuscript to multiple publishers simultaneously and ask how they would respond to its ideas, so she could evaluate who might best promote her work. Rand was impressed by the bold suggestion and by her overall conversations with them. After speaking with a few other publishers from about a dozen who were interested, Rand decided multiple submissions were not needed; she offered the manuscript to Random House. Upon reading the portion Rand submitted, Cerf declared it a "great book" and offered Rand a contract. It was the first time Rand had worked with a publisher whose executives seemed enthusiastic about one of her books.

When the completed manuscript exceeded 600,000 words, Cerf asked Rand to make cuts, but backed off when she compared the idea to cutting the Bible. With 1,168 pages in the first edition, Atlas Shrugged is Rand's longest published book. Random House published the novel on October 10, 1957. The initial print run was 100,000 copies. The first paperback edition was published by New American Library in July 1959, with an initial run of 150,000. A 35th-anniversary edition was published by E. P. Dutton in 1992, with an introduction by Rand's heir, Leonard Peikoff. The novel has been translated into more than 30 languages. (Note: According to the Ayn Rand Institute, Atlas Shrugged has been translated into Albanian, Bulgarian, Chinese, Czech, Danish, Dutch, Finnish, French, Georgian, German, Greek, Hebrew, Hungarian, Icelandic, Italian, Japanese, Kazakh, Korean, Marathi, Mongolian, Norwegian, Polish, Portuguese, Romanian, Russian, Serbian, Slovak, Spanish, Swedish, Turkish, and Ukrainian.)

=== Title and chapters ===
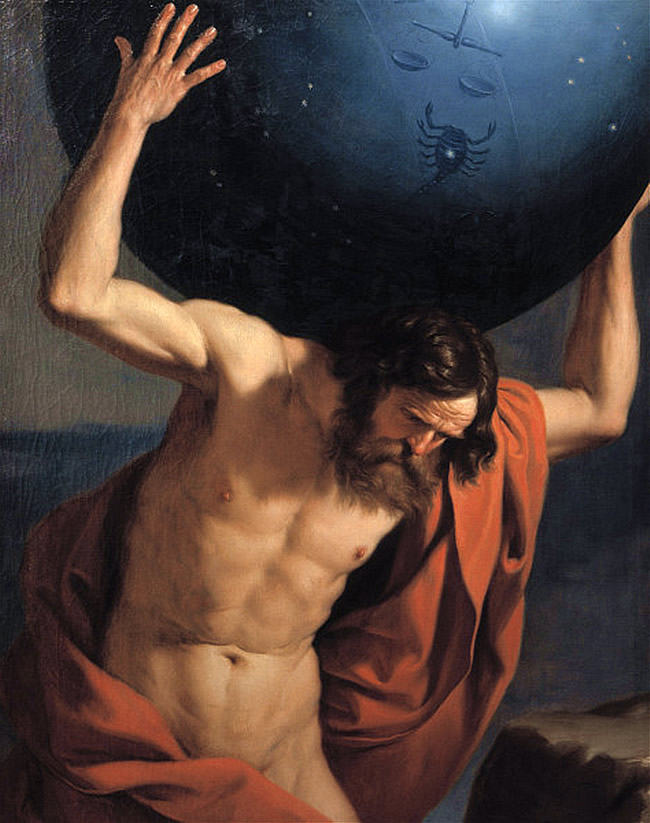
The title refers to the mythological Atlas.

The working title of the novel was The Strike, but Rand thought this title would reveal the mystery element of the novel prematurely. She was pleased when her husband suggested Atlas Shrugged, previously the title of a single chapter, for the book. The title is a reference to Atlas, a Titan in Greek mythology, who is described in the novel as "the giant who holds the world on his shoulders". (Note: In ancient myths, Atlas supported the sky, not the earth. Artistic depictions of Atlas holding a sphere (representing the sky) led to a later misconception that he held the earth.) The significance of this reference appears in a conversation in which Francisco d'Anconia asks Rearden what advice he would give Atlas if "the greater [the Titan's] effort, the heavier the world bore down on his shoulders". With Rearden unable to answer, d'Anconia gives his own advice: "To shrug".

The novel is divided into three parts consisting of ten chapters each. Each part is named in honor of one of Aristotle's laws of logic: "Non-Contradiction" after the law of noncontradiction; "Either-Or", which is a reference to the law of excluded middle; and "A Is A" in reference to the law of identity. Each chapter also has a title; Atlas Shrugged is the only one of Rand's novels to use chapter titles.

== Themes ==
=== Philosophy ===
The story of Atlas Shrugged dramatically expresses Rand's ethical egoism, her advocacy of "rational selfishness", whereby all of the principal virtues and vices are applications of the role of reason as man's basic tool of survival (or a failure to apply it): rationality, honesty, justice, independence, integrity, productiveness, and pride. Rand's characters often personify her view of the archetypes of various schools of philosophy for living and working in the world. Robert James Bidinotto wrote, "Rand rejected the literary convention that depth and plausibility demand characters who are naturalistic replicas of the kinds of people we meet in everyday life, uttering everyday dialogue and pursuing everyday values. But she also rejected the notion that characters should be symbolic rather than realistic." Rand herself stated, "My characters are never symbols, they are merely men in sharper focus than the audience can see with unaided sight. ... My characters are persons in whom certain human attributes are focused more sharply and consistently than in average human beings."

In addition to the plot's more obvious statements about the significance of industrialists to society, and the sharp contrast to Marxism and the labor theory of value, this explicit conflict is used by Rand to draw wider philosophical conclusions, both implicit in the plot and via the characters' own statements. Atlas Shrugged caricatures fascism, socialism, communism, and any state intervention in society as allowing unproductive people to "leech" the hard-earned wealth of the productive; further, Rand contends that the outcome of any individual's life is purely a function of their ability, and that any individual could overcome adverse circumstances, given ability and intelligence.

=== Sanction of the victim ===
The concept "sanction of the victim" is defined by Leonard Peikoff as "the willingness of the good to suffer at the hands of the evil, to accept the role of sacrificial victim for the 'sin' of creating value". Accordingly, throughout Atlas Shrugged, numerous characters are frustrated by this sanction, as when Hank Rearden appears duty-bound to support his family, despite their hostility toward him; later, the principle is stated by Dan Conway: "I suppose somebody's got to be sacrificed. If it turned out to be me, I have no right to complain." John Galt further explains the principle, such as "Evil is impotent and has no power but that which we let it extort from us" and "I saw that evil was impotent ... and the only weapon of its triumph was the willingness of the good to serve it".

=== Government and business ===
Rand's view of the ideal government is expressed by John Galt: "The political system we will build is contained in a single moral premise: no man may obtain any values from others by resorting to physical force", whereas "no rights can exist without the right to translate one's rights into reality—to think, to work and to keep the results—which means: the right of property". Galt himself lives a life of laissez-faire capitalism.

In the world of Atlas Shrugged, society stagnates when independent productive agencies are socially demonized for their accomplishments. This is in agreement with an excerpt from a 1964 interview with Playboy magazine, in which Rand states: "The action in Atlas Shrugged takes place at a time when society has reached the stage of dictatorship." Rand also depicts public choice theory, such that the language of altruism is used to pass legislation nominally in the public interest (the "Anti-Dog-Eat-Dog Rule" and "The Equalization of Opportunity Bill") but more to the short-term benefit of special interests and government agencies.

=== Property rights and individualism ===
Rand's heroes continually oppose "parasites", "looters", and "moochers" who demand the benefits of the heroes' labor. Edward Younkins describes Atlas Shrugged as "an apocalyptic vision of the last stages of conflict between two classes of humanity—the looters and the non-looters. The looters are proponents of high taxation, big labor, government ownership, government spending, government planning, regulation, and redistribution."

"Looters" are Rand's depiction of bureaucrats and government officials, who confiscate others' earnings by the implicit threat of force ("at the point of a gun"). Some officials execute government policy, such as those who confiscate one state's seed grain to feed the starving citizens of another. Others exploit those policies, such as the railroad regulator who illegally sells the railroad's supplies for his own profit. Both use force to take property from the people who produced or earned it. "Moochers" are Rand's depiction of those unable to produce value themselves, who demand others' earnings on behalf of the needy, but resent the talented upon whom they depend, and appeal to "moral right" while enabling the "lawful" seizure by governments.

The character Francisco d'Anconia indicates the role of "looters" and "moochers" in relation to money: "So you think that money is the root of all evil? ... Have you ever asked what is the root of money? Money is a tool of exchange, which can't exist unless there are goods produced and men able to produce them. ... Money is not the tool of the moochers, who claim your product by tears, or the looters who take it from you by force. Money is made possible only by the men who produce."

== Genre ==
The novel includes elements of mystery, romance, and science fiction. Rand referred to Atlas Shrugged as a mystery novel, "not about the murder of man's body, but about the murder—and rebirth—of man's spirit". Nonetheless, when asked by film producer Albert S. Ruddy if a screenplay could focus on the love story, Rand agreed and reportedly said, "That's all it ever was." Technological progress and intellectual breakthroughs in scientific theory appear in Atlas Shrugged, leading some observers to classify it in the genre of science fiction.

Fictional inventions such as Galt's motor, Rearden Metal, and Project X (a sonic weapon) are important to the plot. Science fiction historian John J. Pierce describes it as a "romantic suspense novel" that is "at least a borderline case" of science fiction, specifically American libertarian science fiction based on its political themes. The novel's focus on philosophical issues, including ethics and metaphysics, marks it as a philosophical novel.

== Reception ==
=== Sales ===
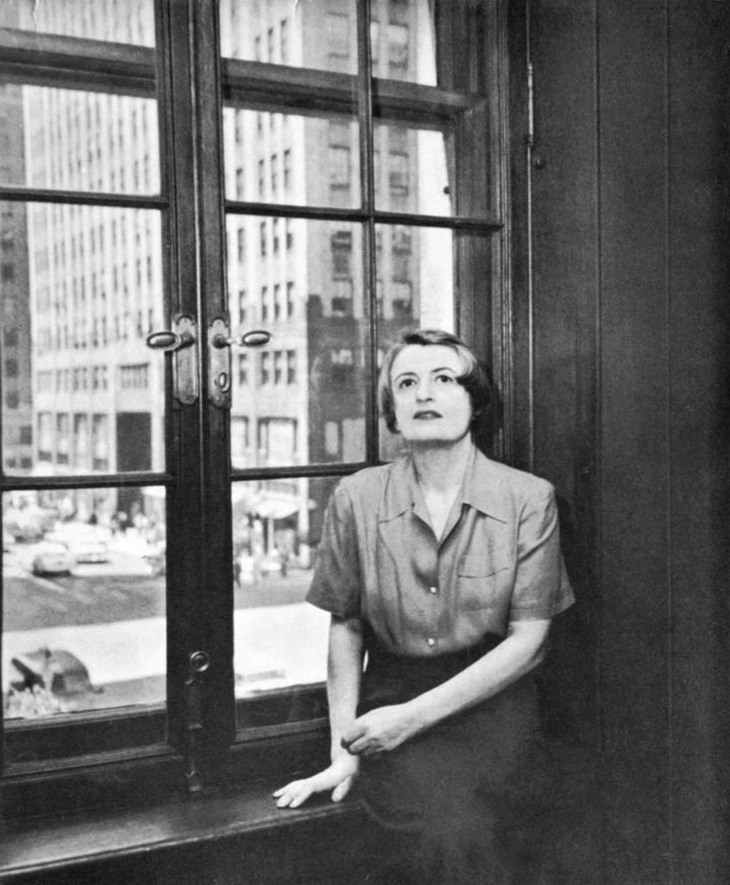
Rand in 1957

Atlas Shrugged debuted at number 13 on The New York Times Best Seller list three days after its publication. It peaked at number 3 on December 8, 1957, and was on the list for 22 consecutive weeks. By 1984, its sales had exceeded five million copies. Sales of Atlas Shrugged increased following the 2008 financial crisis. The novel's sales in 2009 exceeded 500,000 copies, and it sold 445,000 copies in 2011. As of 2022, the novel had sold 10 million copies.

=== Contemporary reviews ===
Atlas Shrugged was generally disliked by critics. Rand scholar Mimi Reisel Gladstein later wrote that "reviewers seemed to vie with each other in a contest to devise the cleverest put-downs"; one called it "execrable claptrap", while another said it showed "remorseless hectoring and prolixity". In the Saturday Review, Helen Beal Woodward said that the novel was written with "dazzling virtuosity" but was "shot through with hatred". In The New York Times Book Review, Granville Hicks similarly said the book was "written out of hate".

The reviewer for Time magazine asked: "Is it a novel? Is it a nightmare? Is it Superman – in the comic strip or the Nietzschean version?" Whittaker Chambers wrote what was later called the novel's most "notorious" review for the conservative magazine National Review, where he called it "remarkably silly" and said it "can be called a novel only by devaluing the term". He predicted that practicing Rand's godless ideology would lead to a dictatorship similar to Nazism or Stalinist communism, and said that throughout the novel "a voice can be heard ... commanding: 'To a gas chamber—go!'".

There were some positive reviews. Richard McLaughlin, reviewing the novel for The American Mercury, described it as a "long overdue" polemic against the welfare state with an "exciting, suspenseful plot", although unnecessarily long. He drew a comparison with the antislavery novel Uncle Tom's Cabin, saying that a "skillful polemicist" did not need a refined literary style to have a political impact. Journalist and book reviewer John Chamberlain, writing in the New York Herald Tribune, found Atlas Shrugged satisfying on many levels: as science fiction, as a "philosophical detective story", and as a "profound political parable".

=== Influence and legacy ===
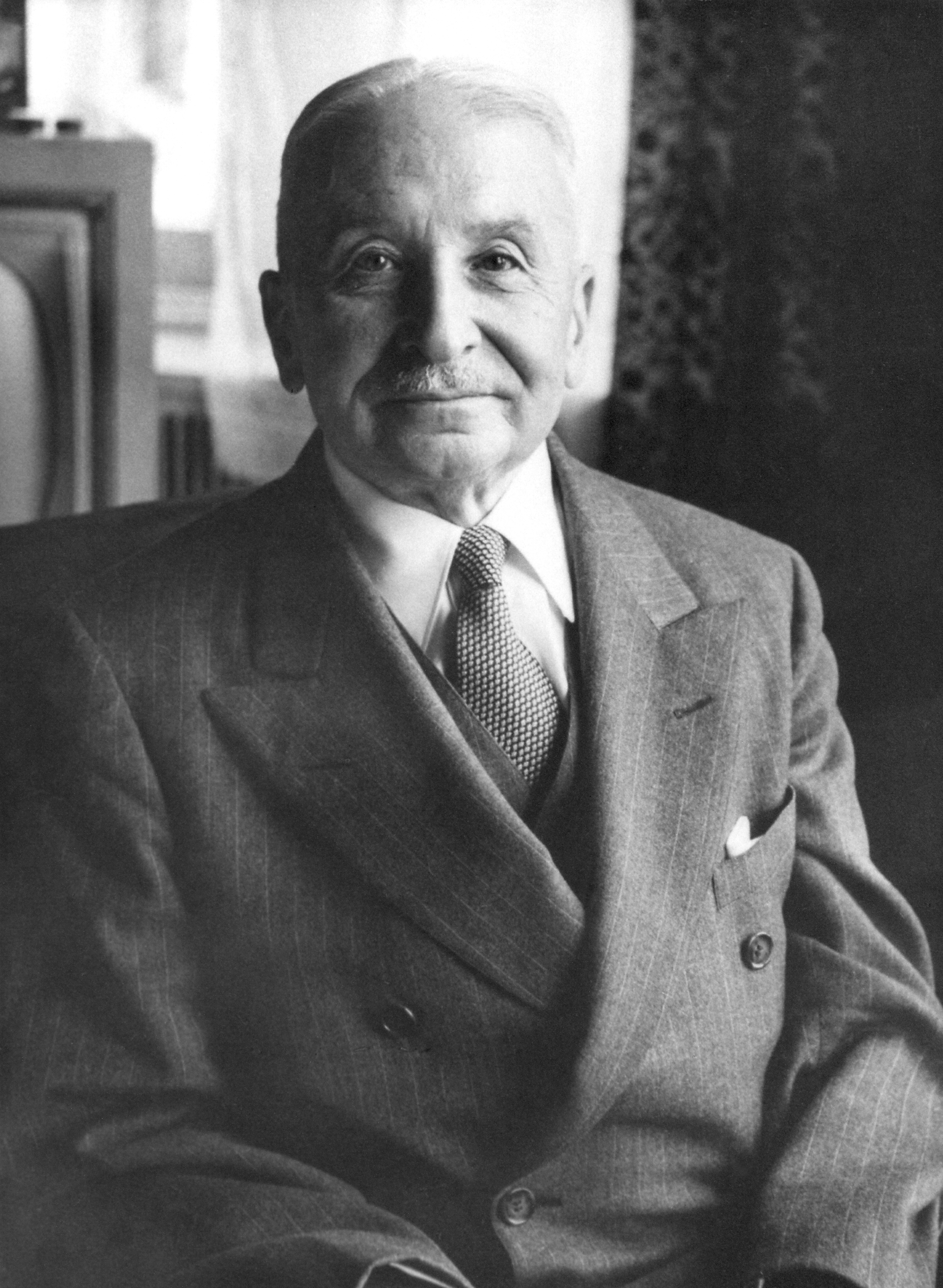
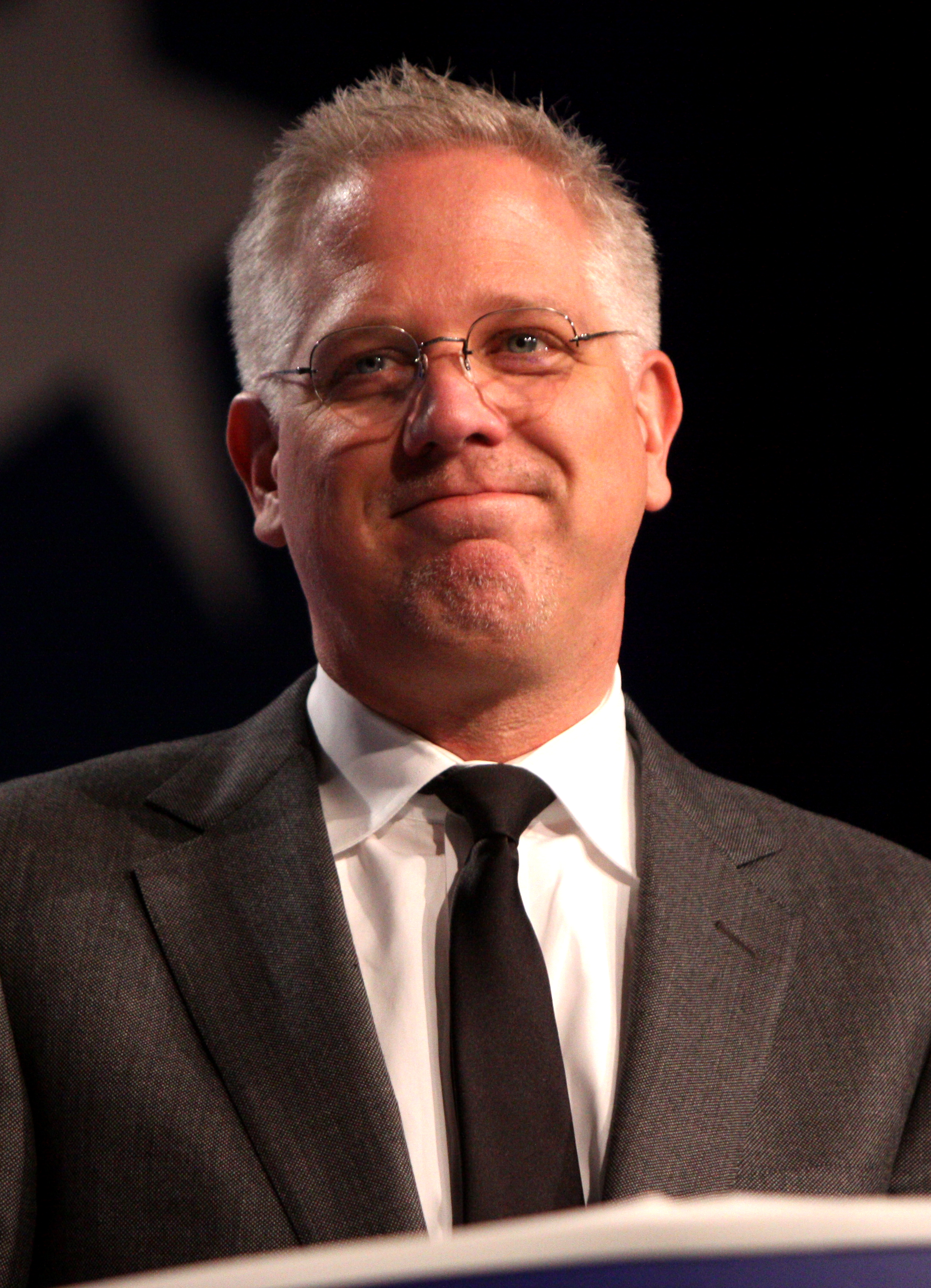
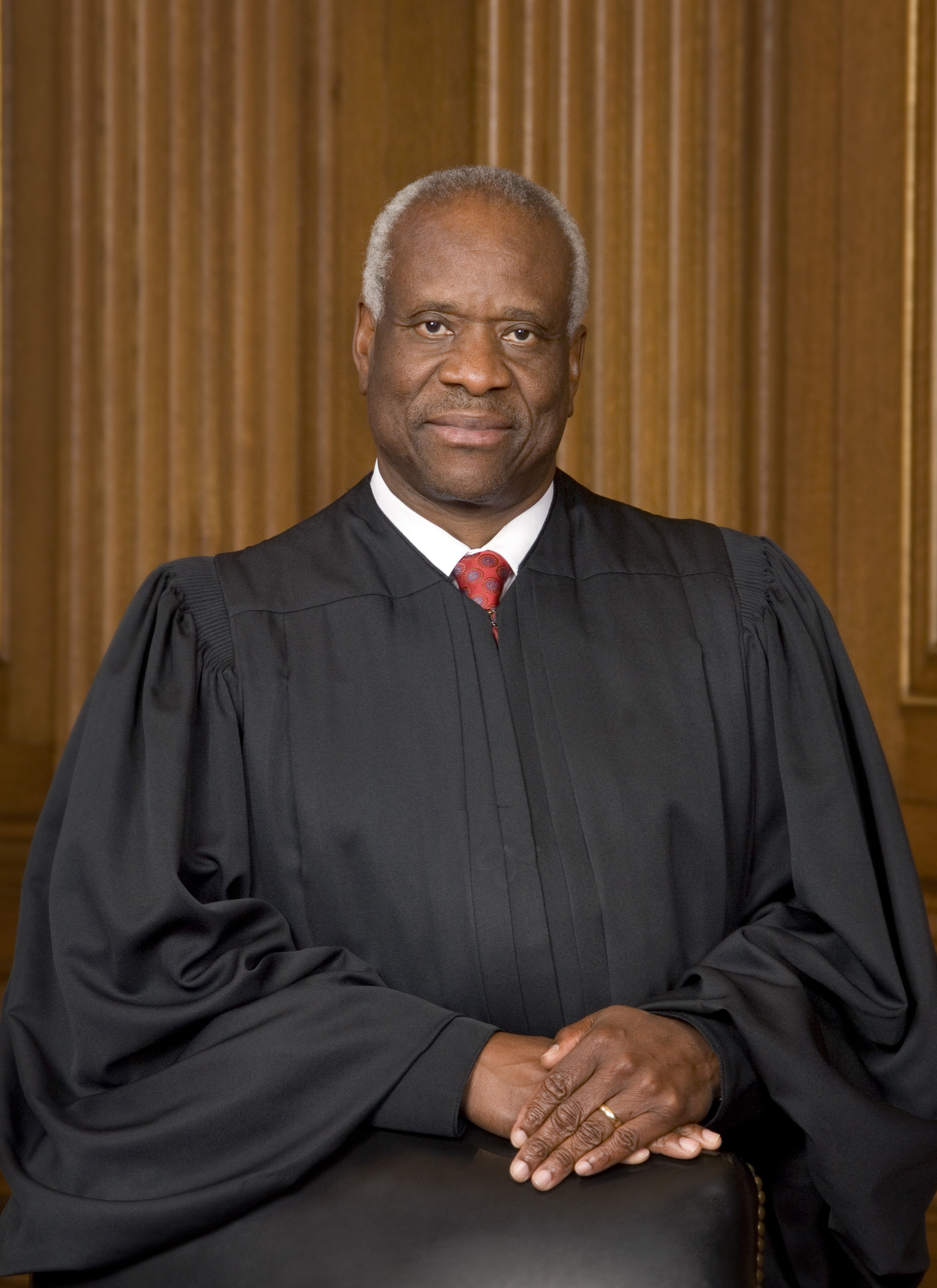
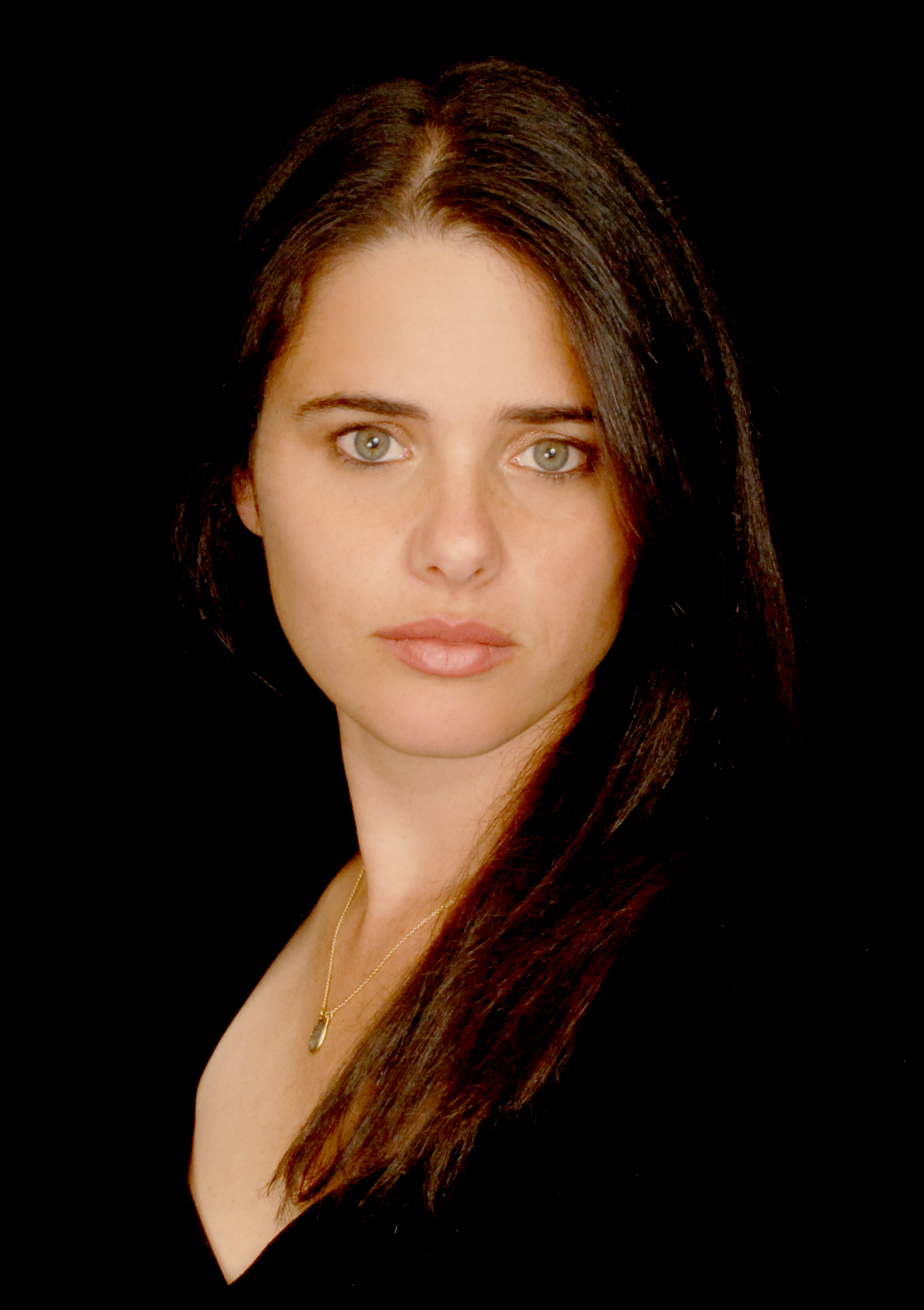
Notable figures who have expressed admiration for Atlas Shrugged include (clockwise from upper left) Austrian-American economist Ludwig von Mises, American commentator Glenn Beck, Israeli politician Ayelet Shaked, and Associate US Supreme Court Justice Clarence Thomas.

In a 1991 survey done for the Library of Congress and the Book of the Month Club, Atlas Shrugged was ranked second among the books that made the most difference in the lives of 17 out of 2,032 Book-of-the-Month club members who responded, between the Bible and M. Scott Peck's The Road Less Traveled.

Modern Library's 1998 nonscientific online poll of the 100 best novels of the 20th century found Atlas rated No. 1, although it was not included on the list chosen by the Modern Library board of authors and scholars. The 2018 PBS Great American Read television series found Atlas Shrugged rated number 20 out of 100 novels, based on a YouGov survey "asking Americans to name their most-loved novel".

Rand's impact on contemporary American libertarian thought has been considerable. The title of one libertarian magazine, Reason: Free Minds, Free Markets, is taken from John Galt, the hero of Atlas Shrugged, who argues that "a free mind and a free market are corollaries". In a tribute written on the 20th anniversary of the novel's publication, libertarian philosopher John Hospers praised it as "a supreme achievement, guaranteed of immortality".

In 1997, the libertarian Cato Institute held a joint conference with The Atlas Society, an Objectivist organization, to celebrate the 40th anniversary of the publication of Atlas Shrugged. At this event, Howard Dickman of Reader's Digest stated that the novel had "turned millions of readers on to the ideas of liberty" and said that the book had the important message of the readers' "profound right to be happy".

Rand's former business partner and lover Nathaniel Branden expressed differing views of Atlas Shrugged. He was initially quite favorable to it, and even after he and Rand ended their relationship, he still referred to it in an interview as "the greatest novel that has ever been written", although he found "a few things one can quarrel with in the book". In 1984, he argued that Atlas Shrugged "encourages emotional repression and self-disowning" and that Rand's works contained contradictory messages. He criticized the potential psychological impact of the novel, stating that Galt's recommendation to respond to wrongdoing with "contempt and moral condemnation" clashes with the view of psychologists who say this only causes the wrongdoing to repeat itself.

The Austrian School economist Ludwig von Mises admired the unapologetic elitism he saw in Rand's work. In a letter to Rand written a few months after the novel's publication, he said it offered "a cogent analysis of the evils that plague our society, a substantiated rejection of the ideology of our self-styled 'intellectuals' and a pitiless unmasking of the insincerity of the policies adopted by governments and political parties ... You have the courage to tell the masses what no politician told them: you are inferior and all the improvements in your conditions which you simply take for granted you owe to the efforts of men who are better than you."

Murray Rothbard, another Austrian School economist, wrote a letter to Rand in 1958 in which he praised the book as "an infinite treasure house" and "not merely the greatest novel ever written, [but] one of the very greatest books ever written, fiction or nonfiction". Rothbard soon distanced himself from Rand due to various disagreements in philosophy, and in the early 1960s he wrote a satirical one-act play titled Mozart Was a Red that spoofed Rand (as the character Carson Sand) and the novel (as Sand's book The Brow of Zeus).

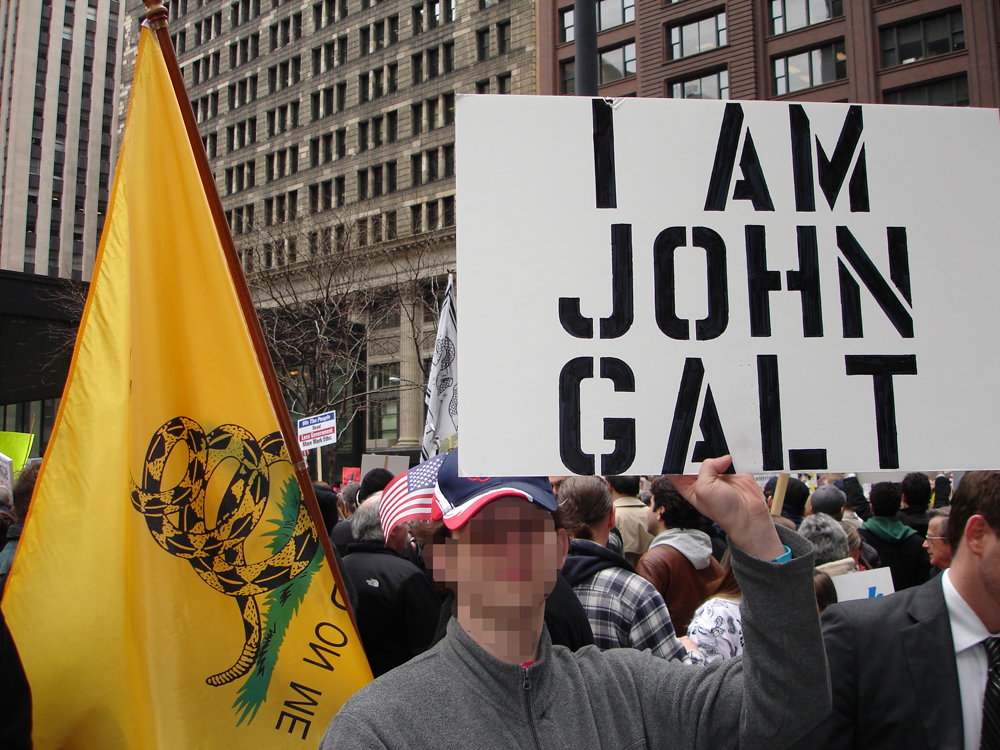
A protester at a Tea Party movement rally in 2009, referencing to John Galt

In the years immediately following the novel's publication, Rand faced intense opposition from William F. Buckley Jr. and other contributors to the conservative National Review magazine, which published numerous criticisms of her writings and ideas. In the 21st century, the novel was referred to more positively by some conservatives. In 2005, Republican Congressman Paul Ryan said that Rand was "the reason I got into public service", and he required his staff members to read Atlas Shrugged, although in 2012 he said his supposed devotion to Rand was "an urban legend". In 2006, Clarence Thomas, an associate justice of the Supreme Court of the United States, cited Atlas Shrugged as among his favorite novels.

Following the 2008 financial crisis, conservative commentators suggested the book as a warning against a socialistic reaction to the crisis. Several conservative commentators, such as Neal Boortz, Glenn Beck, and Rush Limbaugh, offered praise of the book on their respective radio and television programs.

In January 2009, conservative writer Stephen Moore wrote an article in The Wall Street Journal titled "Atlas Shrugged From Fiction to Fact in 52 Years", and two months later Republican Congressman John Campbell said, "People are starting to feel like we're living through the scenario that happened in Atlas Shrugged." Outside of the United States, the novel has been cited as an influence by right-wing politicians such as Siv Jensen in Norway, as well as Ayelet Shaked in Israel.

References to Atlas Shrugged have appeared in a variety of other popular entertainments. In the first season of the drama series Mad Men, Bert Cooper urges Don Draper to read the book, and Don's sales pitch tactic to a client indicates he has been influenced by the strike plot. Less positive mentions of the novel occur in episodes of the animated comedies Futurama, where it appears among the library of books flushed down to the sewers to be read only by grotesque mutants, and South Park, where a newly literate character gives up on reading after experiencing Atlas Shrugged.

The critically acclaimed 2007 video game BioShock is widely considered to be a response to Atlas Shrugged. The story depicts a society that has collapsed due to Objectivism, and significant characters in the game owe their naming to Rand's work, which the game's creator Ken Levine read amidst undergraduate studies of 20th century fiction. In 2013, it was announced that Galt's Gulch, a settlement for libertarian devotees named for John Galt's safe haven, would be established near Santiago in Chile; however, the project collapsed amid accusations of fraud.

=== Awards ===
In the United States, Atlas Shrugged was a finalist for the National Book Award for Fiction in 1958 but lost to The Wapshot Chronicle by John Cheever. In 1983, it was one of the first two books given the Prometheus Awards' Hall of Fame Award for libertarian science fiction, alongside The Moon Is a Harsh Mistress by Robert Heinlein.

== Adaptations ==
=== Film ===
==== Early attempts ====
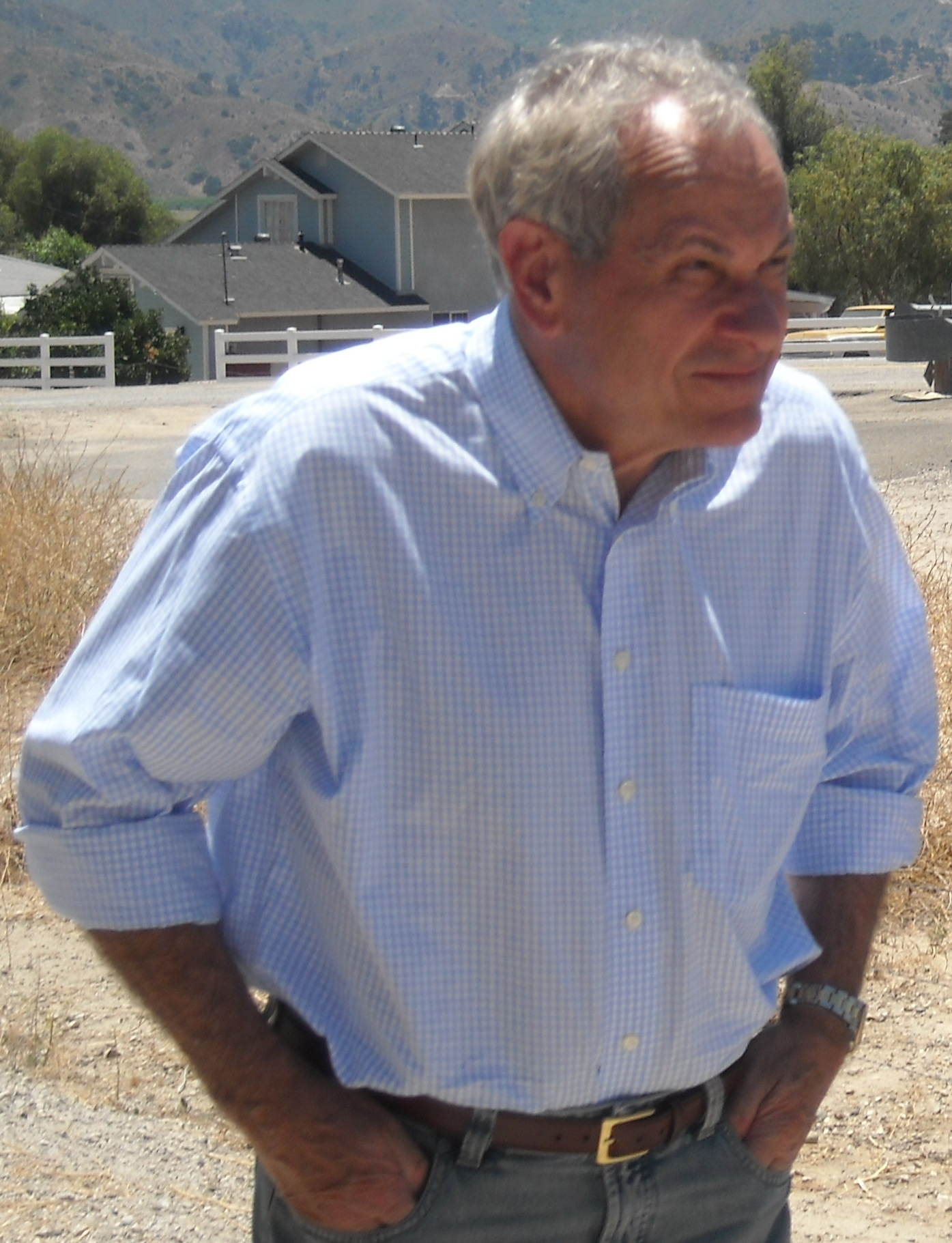
John Aglialoro optioned the film rights in 1992.

A film adaptation of Atlas Shrugged was in "development hell" for nearly 40 years. In 1972, Albert S. Ruddy approached Rand to produce a cinematic adaptation. Rand insisted on having final script approval, which Ruddy refused to give her, thus preventing a deal. In 1978, Henry and Michael Jaffe negotiated a deal for an eight-hour Atlas Shrugged television miniseries on NBC. Screenwriter Stirling Silliphant wrote the adaptation and obtained approval from Rand on the final script. When Fred Silverman became president of NBC in 1979, the project was scrapped.

Rand, a former Hollywood screenwriter herself, began writing her own screenplay, but died in 1982 with only one-third of it finished. Her heir, Leonard Peikoff, sold an option to Michael Jaffe and Ed Snider. Peikoff would not approve the script they wrote, and the deal fell through. In 1992, investor John Aglialoro paid Peikoff over $1 million for an option with full creative control. Two new scripts – one by screenwriter Benedict Fitzgerald and another by Peikoff's wife, Cynthia Peikoff – were deemed inadequate, and Aglialoro refunded early investors in the project.

In 1999, under Aglialoro's sponsorship, Ruddy negotiated a deal with Turner Network Television (TNT) for a four-hour miniseries; however, the project was killed after TNT merged with AOL Time Warner. After the TNT deal fell through, Howard and Karen Baldwin obtained the rights while running Philip Anschutz's Crusader Entertainment. The Baldwins left Crusader to form Baldwin Entertainment Group in 2004 and took the rights to Atlas Shrugged with them. Michael Burns of Lions Gate Entertainment approached the Baldwins to fund and distribute Atlas Shrugged. Although it was ultimately never produced, a draft screenplay was written by James V. Hart, and then rewritten by Randall Wallace.

==== 2011–2014 trilogy ====
Atlas Shrugged was made into a film trilogy, released between 2011 and 2014 to negative reviews.

===== Atlas Shrugged: Part I =====
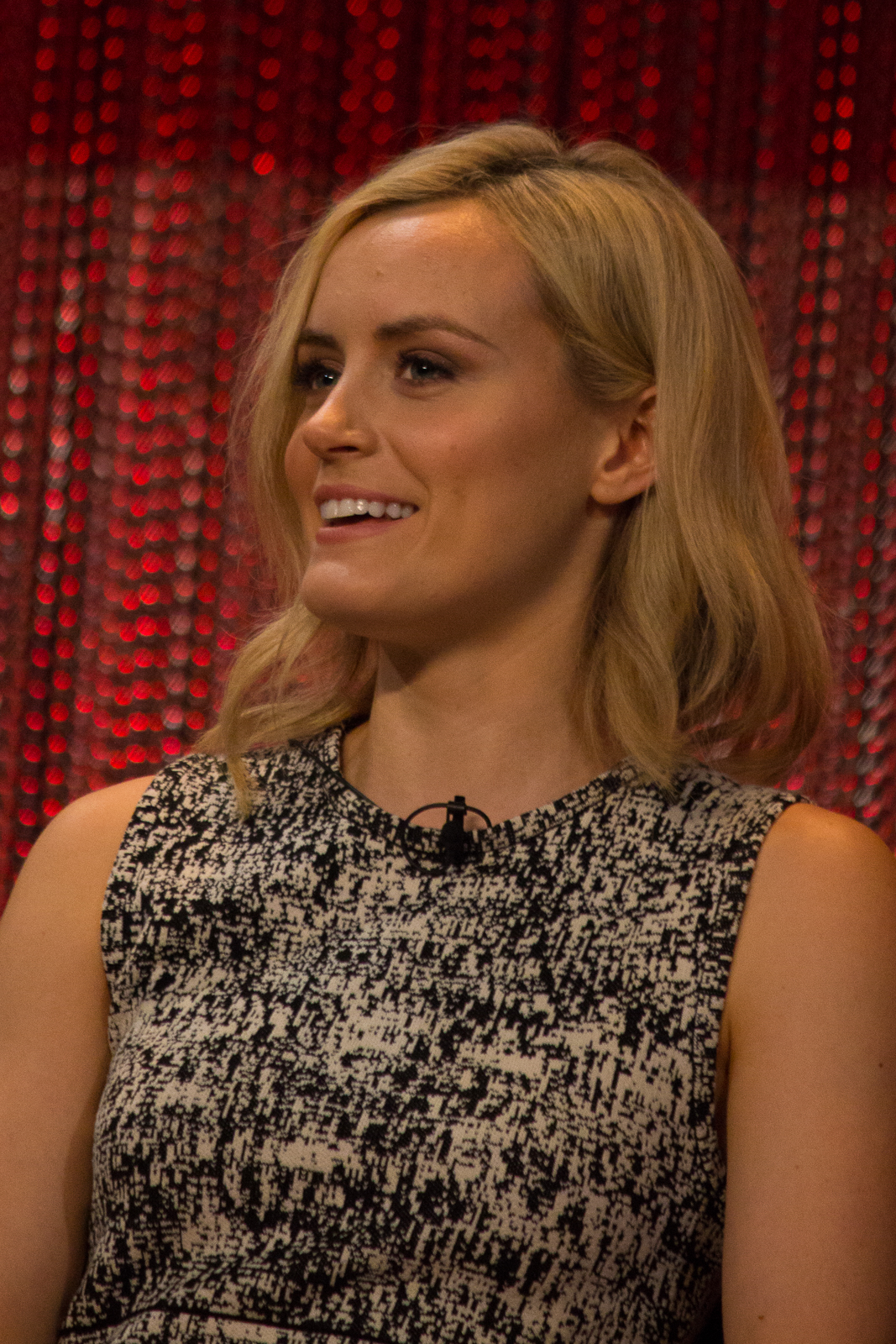
Taylor Schilling played Dagny Taggart in Atlas Shrugged: Part I.

In May 2010, Brian Patrick O'Toole and Aglialoro wrote a screenplay, intent on filming in June 2010. Stephen Polk was set to direct; however, Polk was fired and principal photography began on June 13, 2010, under the direction of Paul Johansson and produced by Harmon Kaslow and Aglialoro. This resulted in Aglialoro's retention of his rights to the property, which were set to expire on June 15, 2010. Filming was completed on July 20, 2010, and the movie was released on April 15, 2011. Taylor Schilling played Dagny Taggart and Grant Bowler played Hank Rearden.

The film was met with a generally negative reception from professional critics. Review aggregator Rotten Tomatoes gives the film a score of 12% based on 52 reviews, with an average score of 3.8 out of 10. The film had under $5 million in total box office receipts, considerably less than the estimated $20 million invested by Aglialoro and others. The poor box office and critical reception made Aglialoro reconsider his plans for the rest of the trilogy, but other investors convinced him to continue.

===== Atlas Shrugged: Part II =====
On February 2, 2012, Kaslow and Aglialoro announced they had raised $16 million to fund Atlas Shrugged: Part II. Principal photography began on April 2, 2012; the producers hoped to release the film before the 2012 United States presidential election. Because the cast for the first film had not been contracted for the entire trilogy, different actors were cast for all the roles.Samantha Mathis played Dagny, with Jason Beghe as Hank and Esai Morales as Francisco d'Anconia.

The film was released on October 12, 2012, without a special screening for critics. It earned $1.7 million on 1,012 screens for the opening weekend, which at that time ranked as the 109th worst opening for a film in wide release. Critical response was highly negative; Rotten Tomatoes gives the film a 4% rating based on 23 reviews, with an average score of 3.2 out of 10. The film's final box office total was $3.3 million.

===== Atlas Shrugged: Part III: Who Is John Galt? =====
The third part in the series, Atlas Shrugged Part III: Who Is John Galt?, was released on September 12, 2014. Dagny was played by Laura Regan, with Rob Morrow as Hank, Kristoffer Polaha as John Galt, and Joaquim de Almeida as Francisco. The movie opened on 242 screens and grossed $461,179 on its opening weekend; the final box office total was $851,690. It was reviewed unfavorably by critics, holding a 0% at Rotten Tomatoes based on 10 reviews, with an average score of 1.8 out of 10.

==== Future ====
In 2015, The New York Times reported that Ruddy had come to an agreement with Aglialoro to make a new television adaptation of Atlas Shrugged. On November 17, 2022, producer Jeremy Boreing announced that conservative media company The Daily Wire optioned the rights to Atlas Shrugged. The company plans to create a series based on the novel for the DailyWire+ video on demand service, in cooperation with the Bonfire Legend movie studio and Aglialoro's Atlas Distribution Company.

=== Stage ===
Atlas Shrugged has been adapted twice as stage plays in German. In 2013, Stefan Bachmann, director of the Schauspiel Köln in Cologne, staged Der Streik (The Strike), a four-hour adaptation co-written by Bachmann and Jens Gross. Bachmann had begun the adaptation eight years earlier but the theaters he worked for prior to Schauspiel Köln were dismissive of the idea. In January 2021, director Nicolas Stemann presented a three-hour musical adaptation, also titled Der Streik, in Zürich, Switzerland. Stemann's version of the story from the novel is presented as a story within a story being staged by a "Church of Ayn Rand" that is associated with the alt-right and white supremacy.

== See also ==
- Objectivism and libertarianism
