= The Driver (novel) =

1922 fiction book by Garet Garrett

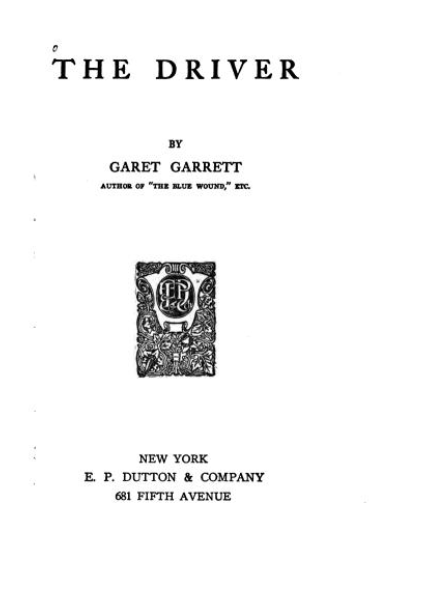
- Title page for The Driver (1922)
- Author: Garet Garrett
- Language: English
- Subject: Fiction
- Publisher: E. P. Dutton
- Publication date: 1922
- Publication place: United States
- Media type: Print (Hardcover and Paperback)

The Driver is a novel by American financial journalist Garet Garrett, published in 1922 by E.P. Dutton. It was first published as part of a six-part series in the Saturday Evening Post.

== Historical context ==
The protagonist, Henry M. Galt, was inspired by railroad executive E. H. Harriman. The novel was also influenced by the zeitgeist of the Gilded Age, a time of rapid industrialization, leading to the growth of corporate power.

== Summary ==
The Driver tells the story of brilliant financial speculator Henry M. Galt. Through his own vision and work ethic, Galt takes over the failing Great Midwestern Railroad during an economic crisis, turning it into a hugely productive and profitable asset for the benefit of himself and the rest of the nation. The novel begins against the backdrop of the panic of 1893 and the free silver movement when many real-life railroads went bankrupt. In large part due to Galt's efforts, the country's economy is restored. Galt's acquisitions and fortune continue to grow and he becomes the wealthiest person in America. Instead of celebration, there is envy and distrust among those who marvel at but fail to understand Galt's genius. His enemies, along with the federal government, set out to destroy Galt and topple the empire he has built.

== Possible Ayn Rand connection ==
Justin Raimondo observed similarities between The Driver and Atlas Shrugged, a 1957 novel by Ayn Rand, which has a railroad executive as its main character and another character named John Galt. In contrast, Chris Matthew Sciabarra argued Raimondo's "claims that Rand plagiarized...The Driver" to be "unsupported", and Stephan Kinsella doubts that Rand was in any way influenced by Garrett. Writer Bruce Ramsey observed, "Both The Driver and Atlas Shrugged have to do with running railroads during an economic depression, and both suggest pro-capitalist ways in which the country might get out of the depression. But in plot, character, tone, and theme they are very different."
