= Bruce Ramsey =

American journalist

Bruce Ramsey is an American journalist and editorial writer for the Seattle Times, as well as contributing editor to Liberty magazine.

== Personal ==
Ramsey is a native to Seattle and grew up in Edmonds. He obtained his degree from the University of Washington and the University of California, Berkeley. He is married to a retired banker and together they live in Seattle, Washington. Ramsey and his wife have one son.

== Career ==
Ramsey began working for the Seattle Times in March 2000 and is responsible for writing about business, economics, law and foreign affairs. Prior, he worked as a business reporter and columnist. Ramsey has edited several books of the writings of American novelist, financial writer and Old Right figure Garet Garrett as well as written Garrett's first full biography, Unsanctioned Voice.
