= Rocket to the Moon (play) =

1938 play by Clifford Odets

- First edition 1939
- Written by: Clifford Odets
- Original language: English
- Genre: Drama
- Setting: Dentist's office, New York City

Premiere
- Date premiered: November 24, 1938
- Place premiered: Belasco Theatre; New York City

Rocket to the Moon is a 1938 play by the American playwright Clifford Odets. Originally produced by the Group Theatre at Broadway's Belasco Theatre, directed by Harold Clurman, starring Morris Carnovsky, Luther Adler and Eleanor Lynn.

== Plot ==
In 1938 New York City, a dentist finds his business and marriage failing as he embarks on a love affair with a young dental assistant.

== Original Broadway cast ==
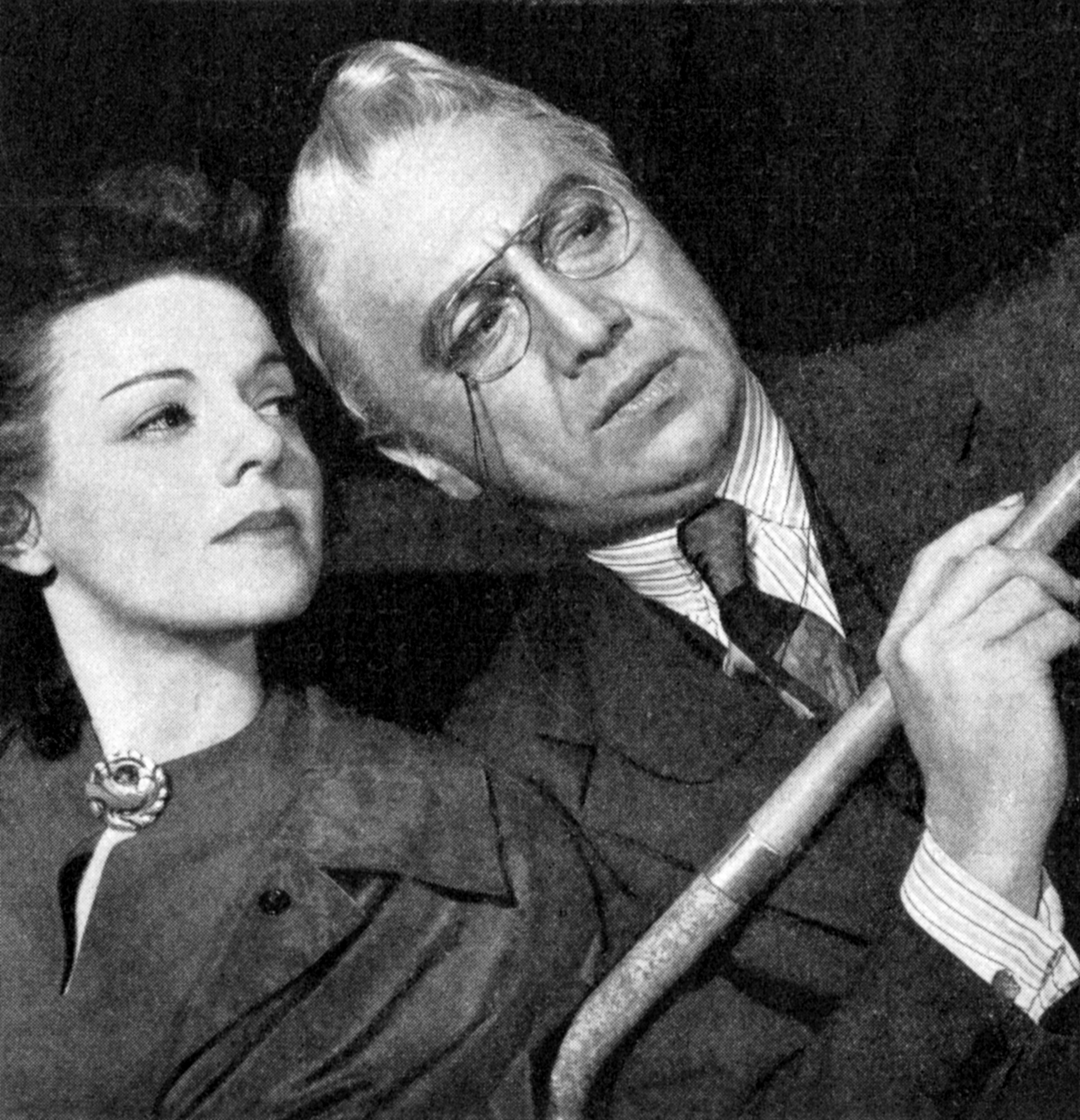
Eleanor Lynn and Luther Adler in the original Broadway production of Rocket to the Moon (1938)

- Luther Adler as Mr. Prince
- Morris Carnovsky as Ben Stark, D.D.S.
- William Challee as a Salesman
- Leif Erickson as Frenchy
- Sanford Meisner as Willy Wax
- Ruth Nelson as Belle Stark
- Art Smith as Phil Cooper, D.D.S.
- Eleanor Lynn as Cleo Singer

== Adaptations ==
The play was adapted for television by the BBC in 1986, with John Malkovich, Judy Davis, Eli Wallach, William Hootkins, Ian McShane and Connie Booth in the lead roles.
