= Garet Garrett =

American journalist (1878–1954)

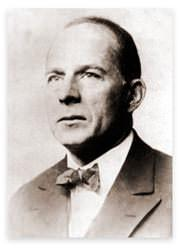
- Garrett in the 1930s
- Born: Edward Peter Garrett; February 19, 1878; Pana, Illinois, U.S.
- Died: November 6, 1954 (aged 76); Tuckahoe, New Jersey, U.S.
- Occupations: Journalist, author
- Spouse: 3

Garet Garrett (February 19, 1878 – November 6, 1954), born Edward Peter Garrett, was an American journalist and author, known for his opposition to the New Deal and U.S. involvement in World War II.

== Overview ==
Garrett was born February 19, 1878, at Pana, Illinois, and grew up on a farm near Burlington, Iowa. He left home as a teenager, finding work as a printer's devil in Cleveland. In 1898, he moved to Washington, D.C., where he covered the administration of William McKinley as a newspaper reporter and then changed his first name to "Garet", which he pronounced the same as "Garrett." In 1900, he moved to New York City, where he became a financial reporter. By 1910, he had become a financial columnist for the New York Evening Post. In 1913, he became editor of The New York Times Annalist, a new financial weekly later known simply as The Annalist, and, in 1915, he joined the editorial council of The New York Times. In 1916, at 38, he became the executive editor of the New-York Tribune.

In 1922, he became the principal writer on economic issues for the Saturday Evening Post, a position he held until 1942. From 1944 to 1950 he edited American Affairs, the magazine of The Conference Board. In his career, Garrett was a confidant of Bernard Baruch and Herbert Hoover.

Garrett wrote 13 books: Where the Money Grows (1911), The Blue Wound (1921), The Driver (1922), The Cinder Buggy (1923), Satan's Bushel (1924), Ouroboros, or the Mechanical Extension of Mankind (1926), Harangue (1927), The American Omen (1928), A Bubble That Broke the World (1932), A Time Is Born (1944), The Wild Wheel (1952), The People's Pottage (1953) and The American Story (1955).

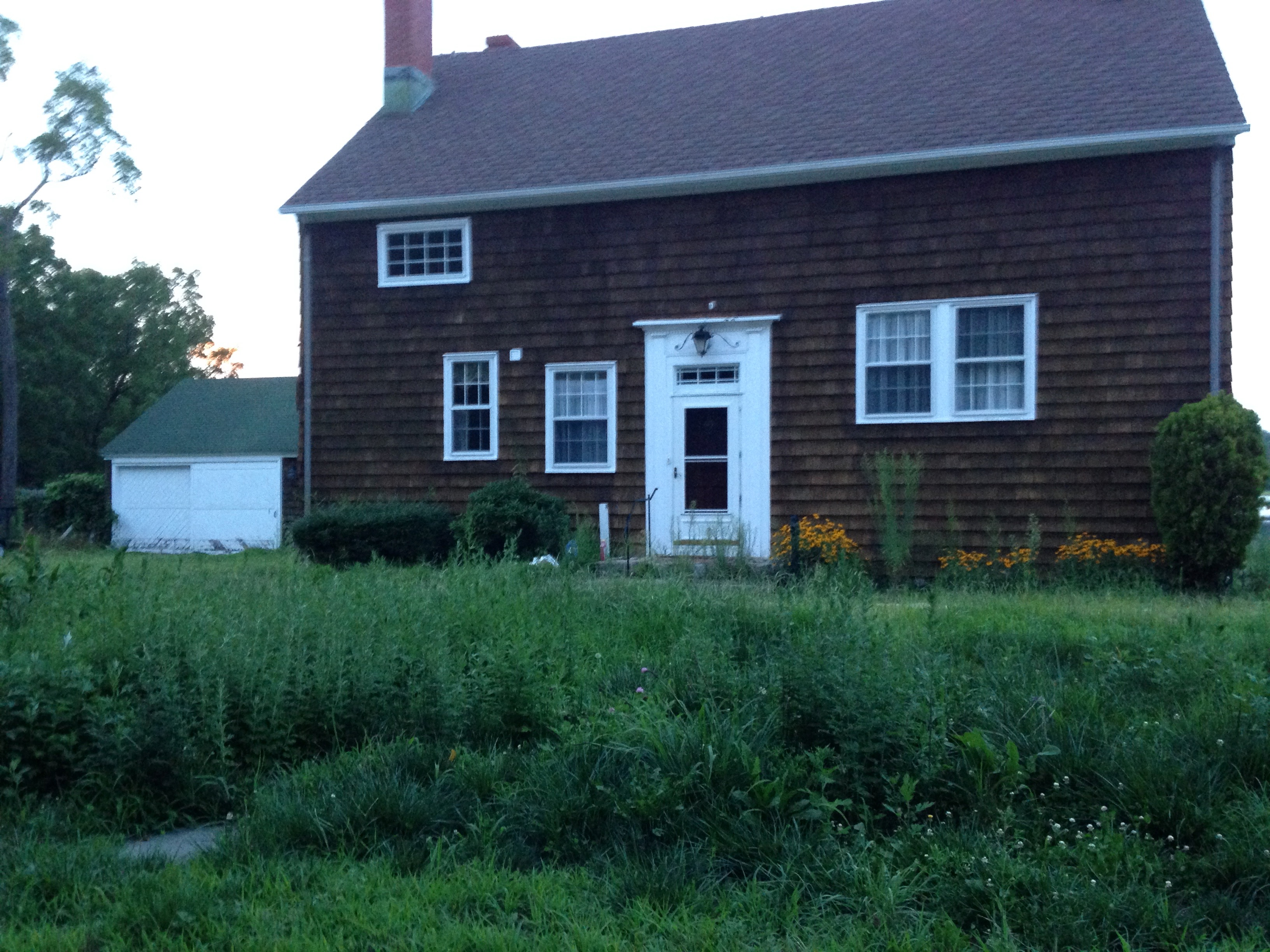
Garet Garrett Writing Studio Marshallville New Jersey 1941–1954

Garrett's most-read work is The People's Pottage, which consists of three essays. "The Revolution Was" portrays the New Deal as a "revolution within the form" that undermined the American republic. "Ex America" charts the decline in America's individualist values from 1900 to 1950. "Rise of Empire" argues that America has become an imperial state, incompatible with Garrett's views, "a constitutional, representative, limited government in the republican form."

Garet Garrett was married three times: to Bessie Hamilton in 1900, to Ida Irvin in 1908, and to Dorothy Williams Goulet in 1947. He had no children. He died November 6, 1954, at his home in the Tuckahoe section of Upper Township, New Jersey, while inspecting the proofs of The American Story.

== Political viewpoint ==
Garett was called a conservative in his obituary, and after his death, his book The People's Pottage was adopted as one of the "twelve candles" of the John Birch Society. He is now sometimes called a member of the Old Right and is seen as a libertarian or classical liberal.

Under the editor George Horace Lorimer at the Saturday Evening Post, in the 1920s, Garrett attacked proposals for American forgiveness of European war debts and for the bailout of American farmers. After the election of Franklin Roosevelt, he became one of the most vocal opponents of Roosevelt's centralization of political and economic power in the federal government. He attacked the New Deal in articles in the Saturday Evening Post between 1933 and 1940.

In 1940, he became the Post's editor-in-chief. Garrett opposed the Roosevelt administration's moves toward intervention in the Second World War in Europe and was one of the most widely-read non-interventionists. After the Japanese attack on Pearl Harbor, Garrett supported the war but was still fired from the Post.

== Connection to Ayn Rand ==
The libertarian writer Justin Raimondo argued that Garrett's 1922 novel The Driver was an unacknowledged influence on philosopher Ayn Rand.

Garrett's novel is about a speculator called Henry M. Galt who takes over a failing railroad and becomes the wealthiest man in America. This is very similar to the basic concept of Rand's 1957 novel Atlas Shrugged, which has a mystery character named John Galt who operates a railroad; the book uses the repeated question “Who is John Galt?”

Chris Matthew Sciabarra argued Raimondo's "claims that Rand plagiarized...The Driver" to be "unsupported".

Garrett's biographer, Bruce Ramsey, wrote: "Both The Driver and Atlas Shrugged have to do with running railroads during an economic depression, and both suggest pro-capitalist ways in which the country might get out of the depression. But in plot, character, tone, and theme they are very different."

== Works ==
- Where the Money Grows (1911)
- The Blue Wound (1921)
- The Driver (1922)
- Satan's Bushel (1923)
- The Cinder Buggy (1923)
- Ouroboros or the Mechanical Extension of Mankind (1926)
- Harangue (The Trees Said to the Bramble Come Reign Over Us) (1926)
- The American Omen (1928)
- A Bubble That Broke the World (1932)
- "The Revolution Was" (1944)
- "Ex America " (1951)
- "Rise of Empire " (1952)
- A Time is Born (1944)
- The People's Pottage(1953) (reprinted as Burden of Empire and Ex America: the 50th Anniversary of the People's Pottage)
- The Wild Wheel (1952)
- The American Story (1955)
- Salvos Against the New Deal: Selections from the Saturday Evening Post: 1933–1940, edited by Bruce Ramsey (2002)
- Defend America First: The Antiwar Editorials of the Saturday Evening Post, 1939–1942, edited by Bruce Ramsey (2003)
- "Insatiable Government," edited by Bruce Ramsey (2008)
- Selections from the Saturday Evening Post (1936–1940)
