= As Husbands Go =

1934 film directed by Hamilton MacFadden

- Directed by: Hamilton MacFadden
- Screenplay by: S. N. Behrman; Sonya Levien
- Based on: As Husbands Go by Rachel Crothers
- Produced by: Jesse L. Lasky
- Starring: Warner Baxter; Helen Vinson; Warner Oland; Catherine Doucet; G. P. Huntley; Eleanor Lynn
- Cinematography: Hal Mohr
- Production company: Fox Film Corporation
- Distributed by: Fox Film Corporation
- Release date: January 27, 1934
- Running time: 78 minutes
- Country: United States
- Language: English

As Husbands Go is a 1934 American pre-Code comedy film directed by Hamilton MacFadden and written by S. N. Behrman and Sonya Levien. It is based on the 1931 play As Husbands Go by Rachel Crothers. The film stars Warner Baxter, Helen Vinson, Warner Oland, Catherine Doucet, G. P. Huntley, Frank O'Connor, and Eleanor Lynn. The film was released on January 27, 1934, by Fox Film Corporation.

== Plot ==
Lucille Lingard and her friend Emmie bid farewell to their European friends on their last night in Paris. Lucille has fallen for the debonair Ronald Derbyshire and dreads returning to her mundane Midwestern hometown in Iowa and her stolid husband Charles. Back in America, Lucille plans to get a divorce and is delighted when Ronald show up. However, he and Charles unexpectedly become close friends, and Ronald admits that he does not find Lucille as attractive as he did in Paris. He leaves the next day and Lucille stays with her husband, won over once more to her family life.

== Cast ==
- Warner Baxter as Charles Lingard
- Helen Vinson as Lucille Lingard
- Warner Oland as Hippolitus Lomi
- Catherine Doucet as Emmie Sykes
- G. P. Huntley as Ronald Derbyshire
- Frank O'Connor as Jake Canon
- Eleanor Lynn as Peggy Sykes
- Jay Ward as Wilbur
