= Eleanor Lynn =

American actress

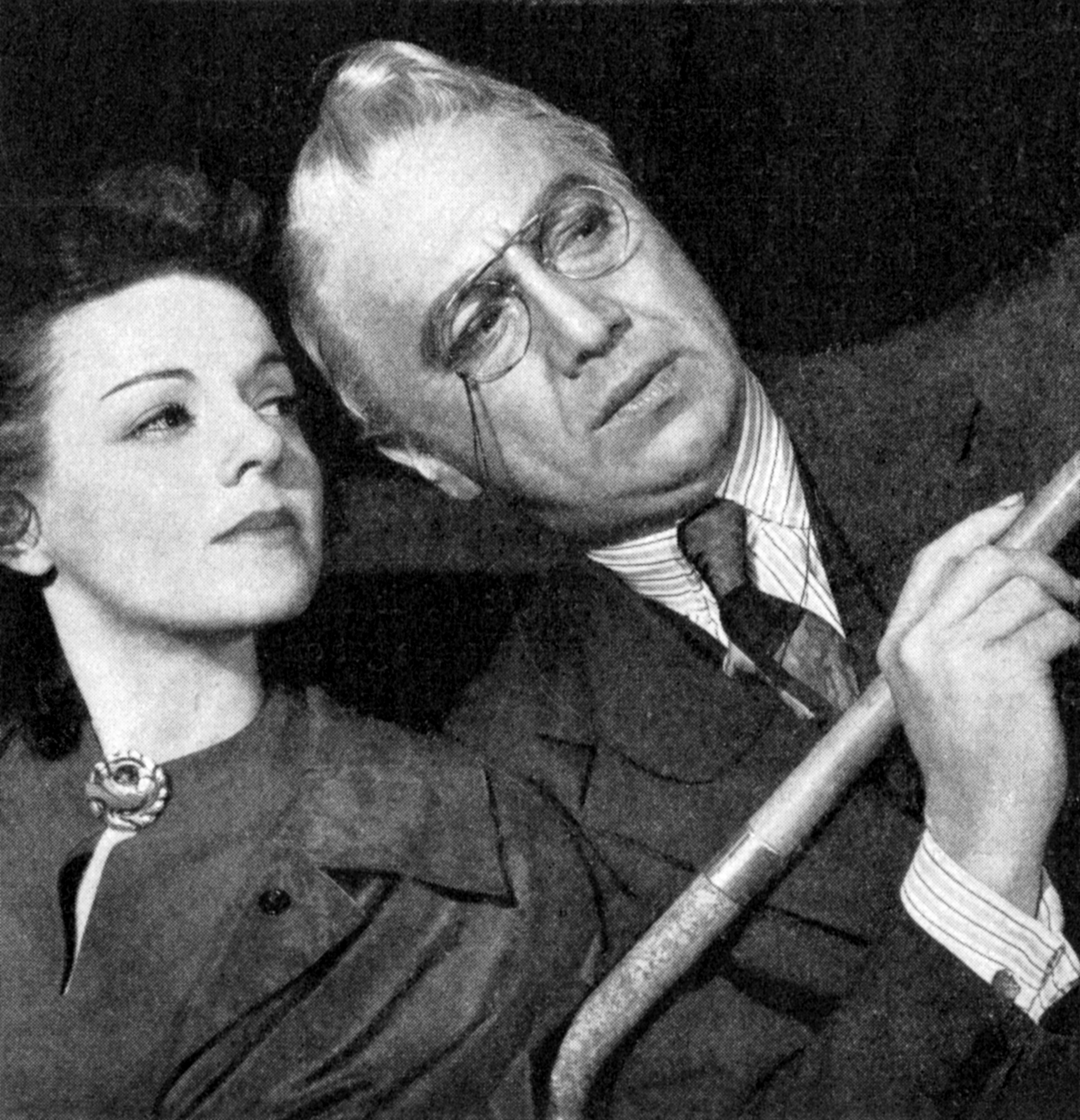
- Eleanor Lynn and Luther Adler in Rocket to the Moon (1938)
- Born: October 29, 1916; New York City, New York, U.S.
- Died: December 26, 1996 (aged 80); Kinderhook, New York, U.S.
- Occupation: Actress
- Spouse: Morris Helprin
- Children: Mark Helprin

Eleanor Lynn (October 29, 1916 – December 26, 1996) was an American actress who was known for both movies and theater. Her films include The Magician's Daughter (1938), Fugitives for a Night (1938) and As Husbands Go (1933). She left Hollywood to star in the Broadway production of the Clifford Odets play Rocket to the Moon (1938), as a member of the Group Theatre in New York City.

== Filmography ==
Year	Title	Role	Notes
1934	As Husbands Go	Peggy Sykes	
1937	You're Only Young Once	Geraldine 'Jerry' Lane	
1938	The First Hundred Years	Receptionist	Uncredited
1938	Hold That Kiss	Theatre Cashier	Uncredited
1938	The Shopworn Angel	Sally	
1938	Fugitives for a Night	Ann Wray	
