= Fugitives for a Night =

1938 film by Leslie Goodwins

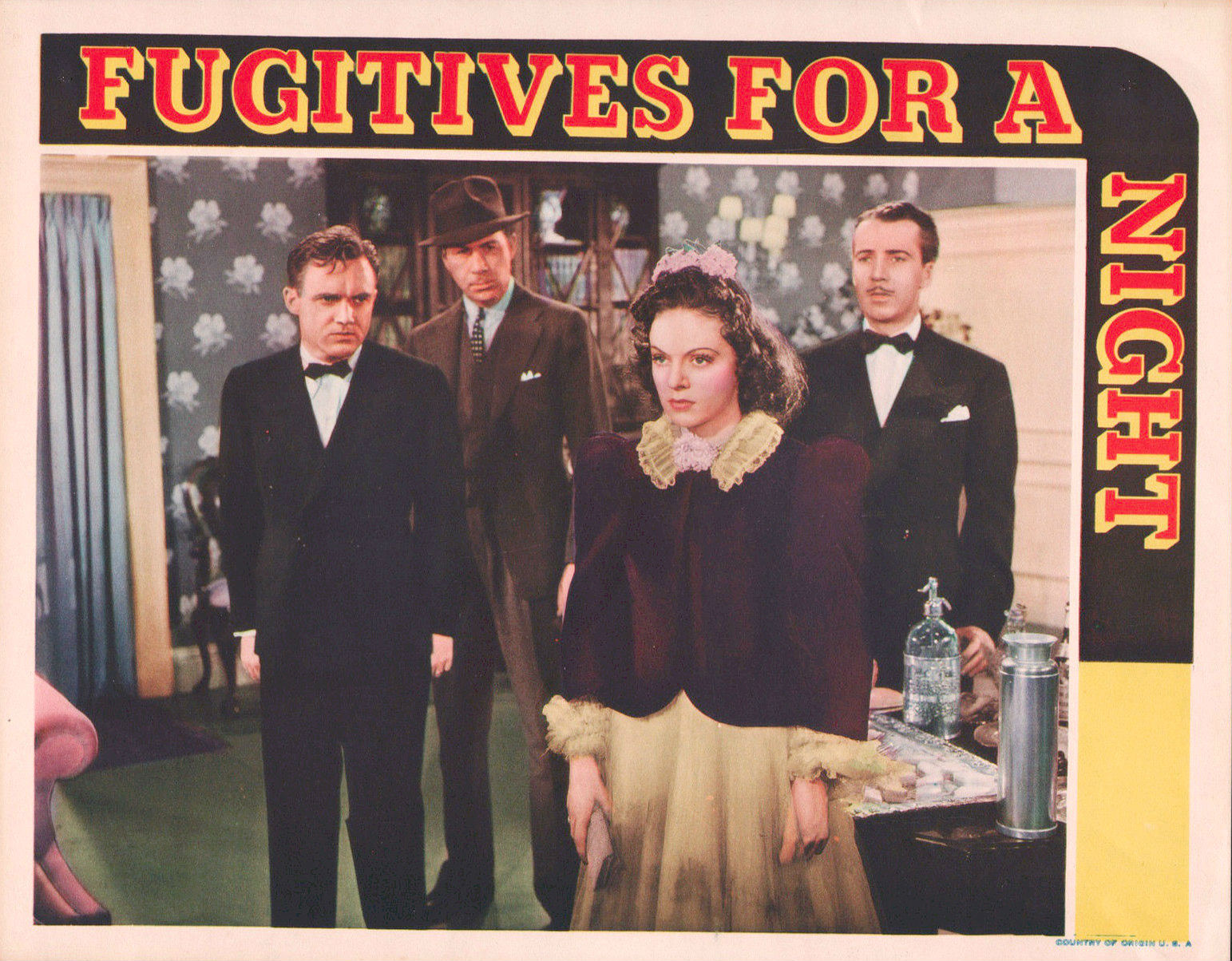
- Lobby card
- Directed by: Leslie Goodwins
- Screenplay by: Dalton Trumbo
- Story by: Richard Wormser
- Produced by: Lou Lusty
- Starring: Frank Albertson; Eleanor Lynn; Allan Lane; Bradley Page; Adrienne Ames
- Cinematography: Frank Redman
- Edited by: Desmond Marquette
- Music by: Roy Webb
- Production company: RKO Pictures
- Distributed by: RKO Pictures
- Release date: September 23, 1938
- Running time: 63 minutes
- Country: United States
- Language: English

Fugitives for a Night is a 1938 American Mystery film directed by Leslie Goodwins and written by Dalton Trumbo. The film stars Frank Albertson, Eleanor Lynn, Allan Lane, Bradley Page and Adrienne Ames. The film was released on September 23, 1938, by RKO Pictures.

== Plot ==
Aspiring actor Matt Ryan has been relegated by the studio to the role of a "stooge" arranging publicity for rising star John Nelson, but when a photo shoot doesn't happen, Nelson winds up walking away from manipulative studio boss Maurice Tenwright. Tenwright then assigns Ryan to act as a stooge for fading star Dennis Poole. In the meantime and in spite of the attentions of studio publicity agent Ann Wray, Ryan tries to pursue actress Eileen Baker, but she shows little interest in him.

Events lead the main characters to a party at the Joshua Club, a desert resort with illegal gambling. As a way of creating media interest, Ryan stages a fake shooting. Soon after, Tenwright advises Ryan to get Poole out of the club because of an impending police raid. During the raid, however, the lights go out and someone shoots and kills Tenwright. When suspicion falls on Ryan, he and Ann get away, eventually hopping on a train's flatbed car.

Thinking that they may know who the killer really is, the couple return to Poole's Hollywood home, where the prime suspects are gathered under the watchful eye of the police captain who expects Ryan to return. Ultimately, the captain performs paraffin tests on the suspects to see who else had recently fired a gun. Poole then confesses and is arrested.

Afterward, Ryan and Ann have coffee at a hamburger stand, considering leaving the movie business. When the stand's owner expresses his frustration with his job, Ryan offers to buy the stand, and he and Ann look forward to a happier life.

== Cast ==
- Frank Albertson as Matt Ryan
- Eleanor Lynn as Ann Wray
- Allan Lane as John Nelson
- Bradley Page as Dennis Poole
- Adrienne Ames as Eileen Baker
- Jonathan Hale as Police Captain
- Russell Hicks as Maurice Tenwright
- Paul Guilfoyle as Monks
- Robert Gleckler as J. G. McGee
