= Robert Bidinotto =

American novelist

- Born: 1949 (age 76–77); New Castle, Pennsylvania, U.S.
- Writing career
- Language: English
- Website: Bidinotto.com

Robert James Bidinotto (born 1949) is an American novelist, journalist, editor, and lecturer. He is best known for his critiques of leniency within the criminal justice system, and for criticisms of the environmentalist movement and philosophy. Bidinotto is influenced by the philosophy and writings of Ayn Rand; further, from July 2005 until October 2008, he was editor-in-chief of The New Individualist, the monthly magazine published by The Atlas Society. In 2011, he turned his focus to writing crime fiction.

== Background ==
In the mid-1980s, Bidinotto was a contributing editor for the Objectivist political newsletter On Principle; then, in 1987, for its brief-lived successor, Oasis magazine. Also during the mid-1980s, he self-published several papers and lectures on libertarianism, styles of thinking, and problems of practicing the philosophy of individualism within the context of ideological organizations.

During the late 1980s and until 1995, Bidinotto was a staff writer for Reader's Digest, for which he authored high-profile pieces dealing with failings in the United States criminal justice system. The most well-known of these was "Getting Away with Murder" (July 1988), which, during the 1988 presidential campaign, helped make murderer William R. ("Willie") Horton and prison furloughs among the decisive issues in the defeat of candidate Michael Dukakis. He also wrote in the magazine about environmental issues, such as the Alar scare and global warming.

Subsequently, he worked for several years for The Objectivist Center in a number of writing, speaking, and fundraising capacities, and later for The Capital Research Center in Washington, D.C., where he edited two monthly periodicals: Organization Trends and Foundation Watch. He left CRC in July 2005 to return to The Objectivist Center, now called The Atlas Society, where he served as editor-in-chief of their monthly magazine of politics and culture, The New Individualist, until October 2008.

Bidinotto's work as a writer and editor has won a number of awards. In September 2007, The New Individualist was honored with Folio magazine's prestigious Gold "Eddie" Award for Bidinotto's article "Up from Conservatism," which appeared in the magazine's March 2007 issue. The American Society of Magazine Editors recognized Bidinotto's prison-furlough article in the July 1988 Reader's Digest as one of five national finalists for "Best Magazine Article of the Year in the Public Interest Category."

Bidinotto currently resides with his wife on the Chesapeake Bay, where he is working on sequels in his "Dylan Hunter" vigilante thriller series.

== Selected bibliography ==
- HUNTER: A Thriller. Avenger Books. 2011. ISBN 978-0615507712.
- "Terrorism and Unilateral Moral Disarmament" in Greaves, Bettina Bien, ed. (1985). Terrorism and the Media. Irvington, New York: The Foundation for Economic Education.
- "Prison Furloughs Allow Criminals to Commit More Crimes" in Dudley, William, ed. (1989). Crime and Criminals: Opposing Viewpoints. San Diego, California: Greenhaven Press. ISBN 0-89908-416-8.
- "What Is Freedom For?" in Robbins, John W. & Spangler, Mark, eds. (1992). A Man of Principle: Essays in Honor of Hans F. Sennholz. Grove City, Pennsylvania: Grove City College Press. ISBN 0-9631818-0-7.
- "What Is the Truth about Global Warming?" in Miller, Robert K., ed. (1992). The Informed Argument: A Multidisciplinary Reader and Guide (3rd ed.). Fort Worth, Texas: Harcourt Brace Jovanovich. ISBN 0-15-541456-9.
- "Global Warming" in Lavdis, D. C.; Santoro, J. & Wasowski, J., eds. (1993). Contemporary Issues. Rocky River, Ohio: The Center for Learning.
- "Environmentalism: Freedom's Foe for the '90's" in Sennholz, Hans F., ed. (1993). Man and Nature. Irvington, New York: Foundation for Economic Education. ISBN 0-910614-88-1.
- Editor. Criminal Justice? The Legal System Versus Individual Responsibility (2nd ed.). Irvington, New York: The Foundation for Economic Education. 1995. ISBN 1-57246-016-4.
- Freed to Kill: How America's "Revolving Door" of Justice Fails to Protect the Innocent. Washington, DC: Safe Streets Coalition. 1996. ISBN 0-9644719-0-6.
