= Ilona Royce Smithkin =

American artist, author, model, and performer (1920–2021)

- Born: March 27, 1920; Poland
- Died: August 1, 2021; Provincetown, Massachusetts

Ilona Royce Smithkin (March 27, 1920 – August 1, 2021) was a Polish-born American artist, author, model, and performer.

Her work included appearances in films such as Advanced Style and Ilona, Upstairs, in the television series Ilona's Palette, Painting with Ilona, and Finishing Touches with Ilona, and the books Painting with Ilona, Joy Dust, and Ninety-Nine: Straight Up, No Chaser.

Smithkin turned 100 in March 2020 and died in August 2021 at the age of 101 in Provincetown.

== Early life and training ==
Smithkin was born Ilona Rosenkranz on March 27, 1920, in Poland.

She was raised in France, Germany and Belgium, and studied at the Reimann School of Art and Design in Berlin and the Academie Royal des Beaux Arts in Antwerp. In 1938, her family emigrated to the United States.

In the United States she studied with Robert Brackman at the Art Students League of New York, and then at the Cape School of Art in Provincetown.

== Art ==
Smithkin's primary mediums were oil painting rooted in Impressionism and sanguine portraiture. Her portrait of writer-philosopher Ayn Rand continues to appear on Rand's book covers and Smithkin has been interviewed about her friendship with the author. Additional subjects of her portraiture were Tennessee Williams and Eugene O'Neill.

Smithkin's work has been exhibited at venues including Musée d'histoire des sciences de la Ville de Genève, Gallerie Charlotte Norberg in Paris, the Eugene O'Neill Memorial Institute in Waterford, Connecticut, the Provincetown Art Association and Museum, and the Columbia Museum of Art. Her work remains on permanent exhibition at the Karilon Gallery in Provincetown, where she maintained a studio.

Smithkin began teaching art in 1970. She was a front runner of the educational painting genre on public television, starring in Ilona's Palette, Painting with Ilona, which spawned a book by the same title, and Finishing Touches with Ilona. She also authored Painting with Ilona, Joy Dust: Ilona at 96, and Ninety-Nine: Straight Up, No Chaser.

== Fashion ==
Smithkin was the subject of Melissa Hammel's Ilona, Upstairs, which received the 2005 HBO Audience Award for best documentary, and as a lifestyle model featured in Ari Seth Cohen's Advanced Style book, documentary, blog, and coloring book, and the Stylelikeu book and blog.

Smithkin appeared as a model at New York Fashion Week, on The TODAY Show, and for fashion lines including Coach, Karen Walker and Mara Hoffman.

Her trademarks included flaming red, pixie-cut hair and matching homemade eyelashes. The New York Post declared her a "style legend."

An essay about Smithkin was featured in Bill Hayes' book, Insomniac City: New York, Oliver Sacks, and Me.

Demi Moore, Dita Von Teese, and actor Erik Liberman have cited Smithkin among their influences. Moore and Von Teese endorsed Smithkin's last book.
