= Robert L. Campbell =

American psychologist

- Born: 1953 (age 72–73)
- Awards: National Merit Scholarship (1971-2), AAUP Award of Merit (2000)

Academic background
- Education: University of Texas at Austin (PhD in developmental psychology), Harvard College (BA in general studies)

Academic work
- Discipline: psychology
- Institutions: Clemson University
- Main interests: theoretical psychology, developmental psychology, cognitive psychology
- Website: https://campber.people.clemson.edu/

Robert L. Campbell (born 1953) is an American psychologist and Professor Emeritus of Psychology at Clemson University. He is known for his studies of Ayn Rand and is an editor of the Journal of Ayn Rand Studies. Campbell is also a retired jazz critic and wrote reviews for Cadence between 1992 and 1998. He is a former editor of New Ideas in Psychology.

== Books ==
- Campbell, R. L., & Bickhard, M. H. (1986). Knowing levels and developmental stages. Basel, Switzerland: Karger.
- Piaget, J. (2001). Studies in reflecting abstraction (R. L. Campbell, Ed. and Trans.). Hove: Psychology Press.
- The Earthly Recordings of Sun Ra, 2nd edition, with Chris Trent, Cadence Jazz Books 2000
