= Raymond Murphy =

Raymond Murphy may refer to:

- Raymond G. Murphy (1930–2007), Medal of Honor recipient
- Raymond M. Murphy (born 1927), American politician from Michigan
- Raymond E. Murphy, American official in the United States Department of State
- Raymond Murphy, American author of English Grammar in Use
