= E. B. C. Jones =

British novelist

Emily Beatrix Coursolles Jones
- "Topsy" Jones c.1921
- Born: 15 April 1893; London, United Kingdom
- Died: 30 June 1966 (aged 73); Newbury, United Kingdom
- Occupation: Writer

Emily Beatrix Coursolles Jones (15 April 1893 – 30 June 1966) was a British writer (pen-name "E. B. C. Jones") whose novels focused on the social and psychological traumas of World War I, on large-family dynamics among young adult siblings, and on relationships among the "liberated" middle-class intelligentsia of the Twenties.

She was also known in the interwar period as a reviewer of contemporary fiction in British literary journals, notably in The Adelphi. (Note: A few poems and reviews in the 1920s were signed "E. B. C. Lucas", her married name.)

== Life ==
Emily Beatrix Coursolles Jones (known as "Topsy" to her friends) was born on 15 April 1893 in London. She was the youngest of eight children of Major Charles Jones (1840–1896) of the Royal Artillery and Mary Jane Ross (1855–1936). (Note: The Jones family tree for the eight siblings appears in Lucy Pollard's Margery Spring Rice: Pioneer of Women's Health in the Early twentieth Century (2020), p.xvii.) She was educated for a time in Paris, where she got to know historian Eileen Power, a university friend (at Girton College, Cambridge) of her older sister Margaret ("Puppy") Jones (who was at Newnham) – but unlike her sister, she did not go on to college. Five of the six Jones sisters, including Topsy, appeared, "thinly disguised", in a 1919 novel by another Girton graduate, Romer Wilson, If All These Young Men. (Three of the sisters had given 'suffragist' as their occupation on the 1911 census form.) Their brother Edward (b.1878), husband of social reformer Margery Spring Rice, was killed in July 1916 in the Battle of the Somme.

Jones's first book was a volume of poetry, Windows (1917). The following year, she edited an anthology of recent poetry, Songs for Sale, which one critic found to be generally unadventurous and too indebted to Britain's poet laureate, Robert Bridges, although one of Jones's own poems was singled out as a happy exception.

Jerked heartstrings in town
I have heard echoes and seen visions of you
Often of late. Once yawning at a play
A sad keen rapture suddenly pierced me through
Because one puppet moved and sighed your way;

An omnibus-conductor fixed your glance
– Intense, preoccupied – upon my fare;
I saw your stooping shoulders, at a dance,
Lean by a doorway: but you were not there.

Down Oxford Street, in the slow shopping crowd,
Hearing your very voice, "Ah, that's superb"
I turned, – a tawdry simpering little dowd
Passed by, and left me trembling on the kerb.

[by E. B. C. Jones; from Songs for Sale (1918)]

Jones's first novel, Quiet Interior, was published in 1920 and praised by such notable contemporary authors as Katherine Mansfield and Rebecca West. She went on to write a handful of others: The Singing Captives (1921), The Wedgwood Medallion (1923), Inigo Sandys (1924), Helen and Felicia (1927), and Morning and Cloud (1932). Although they were generally well received, they have fallen into obscurity in the years since. The New York Bookman reviewer John Macy thought her nom de plume too unmemorable for lasting fame: "Why does she not assume one that will instantly identify her in contemporaneous memory?" he asked in 1928.

Jones moved in Cambridge and London literary circles, associating with the Bloomsbury Group (Virginia Woolf admired "her spruce shining mind") and corresponding with writers Dorothy Richardson, Lytton Strachey, and Steven Runciman, among others. She reviewed modern fiction and biography for The Nation and Athenaeum, The Adelphi, the New Statesman, and The Cambridge Review in the 1920s and '30s, crime fiction for The Spectator, and novels by such writers as Mary Butts for other publications.

Outside fiction, Jones stated her intellectual and religious outlook in her contribution to 'The Adelphi Forum: Religion and The Adelphi ' (July 1931):

"One of the delights of existence is to perceive in widely dissimilar minds and writings the knowledge that human development is going and must go from selfhood to disinterested love - in Freud, for instance, or in W. B. Yeats, Fredegond Shove, Edwin Muir... I myself do not believe in God; where Mr Plowman speaks of the knowledge and love of the will of God, I should speak of the pure perception (here synonymous with love) of reality."

From 1921 to 1929 Jones was married to F. L. ("Peter") Lucas, a classical scholar and literary critic who taught at Cambridge University. Jones was living at the time with her sister Petica, wife of classical scholar Donald Robertson, Lucas's former supervisor at Trinity College. Lucas had fallen in love with her after reading and admiring her first novel, Quiet Interior. Jones based the characters Hugh Sexton in The Singing Captives (1921) (a friend recovering from gassing in the War), and Oliver in The Wedgwood Medallion (1923) (a classics graduate now studying the Elizabethan drama) on Lucas, and dedicated two novels to him. In turn, Lucas's semi-autobiographical first novel, The River Flows (1926), includes a character based on Jones, the novelist Margaret Osborne. They were married for eight years, (Note: "Topsy is charming and in very good spirits and Peter in very good spirits and charming." – Carrington to Strachey from the Lucas' house in Cambridge in 1928. (Chisolm, Anne, Carrington's Letters: her art, her loves, her friendships, London 2017; letter of 16 January.)) her 'salon' in West Road, Cambridge, being described by John Lehmann, who visited it as a student, as 'Bloomsbury-by-the-Cam'. Her admiration for George Rylands (Note: A photograph of Topsy Lucas and Dadie Rylands at Tockington, Gloucestershire (where Rylands grew up), in spring 1928, appears in Simon Goldhill's Queer Cambridge: An Alternative History (Cambridge, 2025), p.175) undermined the marriage by the later 1920s. Noel Annan stated that she was "an important influence" on Rylands' intellectual development. She retained her married name after 1929. Her partner from 1930 to the end of her life was the lawyer Donald Livingstone McIntyre (1905–1981), who was a prisoner of the Japanese during the Second World War. Her sister Petica was killed while on air-raid warden duty on 24 February 1941, the only civilian casualty in Cambridge of German bombing.

Jones died of a stroke on 30 June 1966. She left an unpublished (2025) memoir.

== Publications ==
=== Novels ===
- Quiet Interior, London (Richard Cobden-Sanderson), 1920; New York (Boni & Liveright), 1926
- The Singing Captives, London (Richard Cobden-Sanderson) 1921; New York (Boni & Liveright), 1922 (Note: The dust jacket of the first American edition (1922) carries a portrait photograph of Jones.)
- The Wedgwood Medallion, London (Chatto & Windus), 1922; New York (Henry Holt and Company), 1923
- Inigo Sandys, London (Chatto & Windus) & New York (Henry Holt and Company), 1924
- Helen and Felicia, London (Chatto & Windus) 1927; New York (Henry Holt and Company), 1928
- Morning and Cloud, London (Victor Gollancz), 1932

=== Short stories ===
- 'The Bathe' (The Nation and Athenaeum, 10 December 1927)

=== Poetry ===
- Windows, verse by Christopher Johnson and E.B.C. Jones (Oxford: B. H. Blackwell, 1917) (Note: Seven poems by Jones, and five translations by Jones of poems by Albert Victor Samain.)

=== Anthology ===
- Songs for Sale : an anthology of recent poetry, ed. E.B.C. Jones (Oxford: Blackwell, 1918) (Note: Includes poems by the Sitwells, Dorothy L. Sayers, and Aldous Huxley, and three by Jones.)

=== Criticism ===
- 'E. M. Forster and Virginia Woolf', essay in The English Novelists; a survey of the novel by twenty contemporary novelists, ed. Derek Verschoyle (London: Chatto & Windus, 1936)

== The novels ==
Jones's novels deal with World War I, its immediate aftermath, and its effects on Britain's educated classes, exploring relationships among the young in the changed wartime and post-war worlds. Quiet Interior is set during the War, the plot revolving around the relationship between two sisters, Claire and Pauline Norris, and their romantic entanglement with a man named Clement. The Singing Captives is set in 1920 and examines the War's destructive consequences for a well-to-do family. The Wedgwood Medallion moves on from the War, focusing on an engaged couple who discover their incompatibility, triggering events that draw in their families and friends. Inigo Sandys begins in Cambridge University after the War, where the eponymous protagonist struggles with the first of three doomed relationships. Several characters from Quiet Interior reappear in this novel. Helen and Felicia and Morning and Cloud examine love and marriage among the cultivated middle-class young in the later Twenties. All six novels, to some degree, explore compatibility and incompatibility – Jones's central theme.

=== Quiet Interior (1920) ===
"Clement reminds me a little," Hilary presently went on, in a voice as nearly approaching the softly reminiscent as she could attain, "of such a nice man I knew in Simla: a Captain Everard. He made love in the dearest way – I could hardly bear to refuse him. He had the same way of looking at me as though I was a revelation from heaven as Clement has of looking at you. And he was so shy and charmingly awkward about it all, like a great schoolboy, only not horribly clumsy, you know. They make the very nicest kinds of husbands, that sort."

"Why didn't you marry him?"

"My dear child, he hadn't a sou. And anyway I wasn't prepared to live in India for the rest of my life. Of course, I was very young then, but still, I knew it wouldn't do. I dare say if he'd been in Clement's position I should have succumbed," she added gaily.

– From Chapter XVIII of Quiet Interior (1920)

Set in middle-class Westminster, Bayswater and Berkshire, 1915–16. Jobs for young middle-class women are scarce, so Claire Norris, 21, works as unofficial secretary to her Member-of-Parliament father. Unselfishly and secretly, she loves gentle Clement Parsons, a neighbour from the country, who regards her as a true, wise but over-cerebral friend. Her sardonic and whimsical confidante, Henrietta Lincoln, gives her D. H. Lawrence's poems and advises her, "Don't be too scrupulous, oh don't! It doesn't pay... You're his friend, and if you want him, for the Lord's sake take him!" Sensing Clement's lack of passion for her, Claire rejects his tentative sexual advances that might have turned his feelings into love. She regrets her coldness the more because he is off to the Western Front: "She had seen him stand within her grasp, and had not reached out a hand." He is soon back, wounded and invalided out of the army. Claire helps her younger sister Pauline, 19, escape the advances of the cynical Ivor Webb, only to find Clement falling in love with Pauline. Though torn, Claire unselfishly encourages Clement: "Be as impulsive as you feel", she tells him. "Don't check yourself; above all don't be diffident. Oh, Clement, diffidence is the devil!" Their older step-sister Hilary, 23, returns from a long stay in Russia, worldly and insensitive; she is struck by Pauline's beauty and immediately starts plotting a 'good' marriage for her. After various false starts Hilary learns that Clement not only has money but is now also the beneficiary of the will of a comrade killed in action. She therefore targets him for Pauline, callously edging out Claire, whom she despises. Claire's 'quiet interior', the novel's central focus, becomes a place of repressed pain and desolation. Claire is now drawn to Henrietta's strong silent brother Lucien ('Lucy'), left lonely by the marriage of Henrietta to artist Bill Osler, soon returning to the Front with the Artists Rifles. Though she has lost Clement, Claire begins at last to fight back against horrible Hilary.

Loss, the impact of the War on the younger generation, especially on young women (Henrietta receives news that her brother Russell has been killed), and the clash of generations in their outlook on the War, are central themes. Visiting Clement in a war-hospital, Claire reflects:

These men were, or had lately been, in pain; they had struggled in hell, and no stillness and peace, comfort and security, flowers or sunlight, could ever quite atone. She felt herself responsible – as is every inhabitant of every land at war – for their suffering and loss of limbs and health, their horrible memories and intolerable nightmares, and her responsibility combined with her immunity made her ashamed.

=== The Singing Captives (1921) ===
Set in upper middle-class Kensington and rural Derbyshire in 1920, the novel centres on the family of Sir Harold Peel ('Hal'), who appears stolid and sensible to his children but conceals from them his addiction to risk-taking on the stock-market. Lady Peel (Leila) appears silly and superficial to her children, concealing from them a core of wisdom born of Victorian thwarted love and marital compromise. The four children do not know their parents. Caroline ('Cabs'), 28, has closed in upon herself (apart from a Cathy-Heathcliff type relationship with her brother Roden) since her fiancé, Gerald Sexton, was killed in Mesopotamia in 1917. Detached, she observes life and her family critically and perceptively. Roden, 27, a war veteran, is in rebellion against his family, his class and its values. Stella, early 20s, is a spoilt, superficial flapper; Francis, 18, a carefree public schoolboy lined up for Cambridge. Roden shocks his family – but not Caroline – by going out with and bringing home a 'common' London working girl, Grace Draper. Grace, like Liza Doolittle, has a dignity and self-respect, despite her comic lower-middle gentility, and is immune to the snobbery of the Peels. At the height of the Peels' superiority, and to the children's horror, Hal's financial affairs crash, sending the family plunging economically into the lower middle class. No society marriage and roaring twenties now for Stella: no Cambridge for Francis... The novel comes to focus on Caroline, who, stricken by the War, learns to live and love again thanks to the example of Roden and Grace, to the confession of her mother Leila, who confides to her the story of her youthful suffering, and to the kindliness of her dead fiancé's brother, Hugh Sexton, who was gassed in the trenches. Hugh, however, finds Caroline still too lacking in vitality. "[She] was not steel to his tinder. To smite or to draw him into passion a woman would have to combine Caroline's delicacy of touch and fineness of perception with courage, enthusiasm, and a bolder outlook." Caroline will have to change.

Webster's "We think caged birds sing, when indeed they cry" is the novel's epigraph: the younger generation, apparently privileged but in reality trapped by the legacy of war and class, were singing captives. "The jailor who holds the members of this family captive is that surface conventionality of family life that hides each from each", noted Llewellyn Jones. The novel ends with a note of liberation: Hal and Roden and Francis, like characters in Chekhov, will now have to do some real work; Stella must marry where she may; Caroline too will have to find work, though trained up to nothing by her upbringing.

=== The Wedgwood Medallion (1923) ===
Set in north Cornwall and Chelsea, 1922. Nicholas Watergate, 28, war veteran and son of a famous Victorian artist, is holidaying with his two brothers and a friend, Oliver, 24, near Tintagel, without women. Denis Ash, 25, has invited himself along, so he can keep an eye on Nicholas for Enid. (Enid is Denis's sister. Nicholas and Enid married in haste when he was 21 and she 18. They are now estranged but hide this from the Watergate parents, living out a charade of happily-marrieds.) In Cornwall the young men meet a local family - all women - the Rendels: mother, Fia, and young daughters including cerebral Sophie, 22, and pre-Raphaelite Sheila ('Shelly'), 17. A few days later, Denis and Sophie, moved by the romantic setting, rashly get engaged. They are an "ill-assorted pair": Sophie intellectually honest, open, generous; Denis reserved, complacent, self-deceiving. Meanwhile, Oliver, a Cambridge Classics graduate, has fallen in love with Sophie:

Oliver looked at her and smiled; her hatred of sham pleased him exquisitely; he found that almost every time she spoke, it was to utter his thoughts in her own way.

She likes him more and more and Denis less and less. The Watergate parents arrive in Cornwall, as does Enid, a smug, hypocritical beauty, with a sporty young man in tow. Nicholas encounters Shelly alone by the sea at sunset and kisses her on impulse (as in A Room with a View). Shelly feels flattered; but the kiss was witnessed by father Watergate, who is outraged. Nicholas has insulted Enid and blighted Miss Sheila's bloom! Enid pretends to be upset, and magnanimously forgives her husband. (Freedom within a broken marriage suits her.) The Watergate brothers, Oliver and the Rendell girls all see through and dislike Enid. Sophie is unable to hide her dislike of Enid from Denis, who is blind to Enid's faults. Denis, realising their incompatibility of outlook, breaks off the engagement. Sophie is shattered; she was still in love with him. Sensing Oliver's love for her, she turns to him...

The Wedgwood medallion, a male figure on one side, a female on the other, is a gift from old Mr Watergate to Sophie. To him it means the difference of the sexes; to Sophie the sexes are alike: it's character and values that matter.

=== Inigo Sandys (1924) ===
Set in Cambridge, London and Berkshire, 1919–23. At Cambridge, student Inigo Sandys, 19, longs for someone to call his own. He doesn't respond to undergraduate-friend Charles Wickham's advances (Charles is gay) – he doesn't understand them – but, sexually ambivalent himself (Jones told her friend George Rylands that Inigo was based on him), longs romantically for friendship with flaxen-haired Ny Crayshaw in the year above. Charles drops Inigo, who is shocked, hurt and puzzled. In London a year after graduating, Inigo, 22, is in a love-tangle: his old school friend Roddy Hirst loves, unrequited, Lydia Laud, who loves, unreciprocated, Inigo, and who hates, reciprocated, her sister Jocelyn. Inigo has had little experience with women; he thinks he is in love with poised, suave, ruthless Jocelyn, 24, a sculptor. Despite Roddy's warning that Jocelyn has never loved anyone, Inigo marries her. Lydia, despairing, later accepts Roddy. After an apparently happy honeymoon, Jocelyn turns out to be unresponsive to Inigo – she's lesbian, as we learn towards the end of the novel. Inigo, still in love with Jocelyn, is miserable about his sexless marriage. "Restraint was laid on him like fetters. Every day was a fresh death for the daily new-born hope that this inexplicable change had been merely a mood". Eventually he gives up on her and goes abroad. A year later, back in England, he is drawn into the circle from Quiet Interior. Claire (née Norris) and 'Lucy' (Lucien) Lincoln are now happily married; Lucy's sister and Claire's best friend, Henrietta, 28, is now a young widow, Bill Osler having been killed in action near the end of the War. Inigo is not attracted at first to Henrietta; he admires Claire. He is gradually drawn to Henrietta, however, by his interest in Bill's paintings, and then by her qualities – courage, good sense, humour, sensitivity, intellectual honesty. (Henrietta, half French, is appalled by French havoc in the Ruhr, which is sowing the seeds of another European war.) She shows understanding and sympathy when Inigo tells her about Charles and Jocelyn: "An immense relief came to him, as though he were thus made once more a member of a beloved community – exile at an end". Inigo grows to love Henrietta in a way that makes him feel he has never before loved anyone:

Charles needed me, and I didn't know how to manage and respond; and so he was angry and wretched. It was stupid of me, and unkind... "It takes time to acquire the technique of kindness," Henrietta said. How well she puts things.

His feelings are returned. But Henrietta is consumptive. Inigo goes to live with her, Claire, and Lucien in the country. He meets Jocelyn again and finds he is indifferent to the woman he had once loved "in compulsion and blindness, in rapture and pain". Inigo and Henrietta are quietly happy in their last months together, close to nature, days made poignant by their knowledge of her impending end. She dies of a haemorrhage one winter afternoon with Inigo beside her. Moments later Inigo shoots himself with Bill Osler's service revolver.

=== Helen and Felicia (1927) ===
The pleasure of having Aswell at home again was modified by the persistency of her singing. She not only practised seriously at the piano; she spouted roulades in her bath; she stood about at open windows, on landings, in passages, her hands held down together before her as if she were a puppet, or clasped behind her as if she were a child in a dame's school, singing away like mad. Sometimes she spread her hands upon her ribs. She sang at meals; every night, as they trouped upstairs to bed, with a curious family unanimity, Mrs Cunningham had to repeat: "Hush, Aswell, the servants!" and at a laudably unvarying hour every morning, her voice was heard through the door of the turret lavatory.

– Opening paragraph of Helen and Felicia (1927)

Set in the Home Counties, London and Wiltshire in the mid-1920s. Slim tall fair-haired Felicia Cunningham, 15, is second-youngest in a family of eight children – or rather two families with one father. The house in the country is full of tensions, so Felicia escapes through dreams and long walks. Her favourite sister (only true sister) is the clever, analytical Helen, 18, who is off soon to Newnham, Cambridge. Felicia depends for happiness on Helen's presence and misses her badly when she's away; Helen loves Felicia and sometimes forgets, in their chats, that she's only 15. Helen was a hit at Miss Ffoliot's boarding-school for girls, and now it's Felicia's turn to be sent there. Felicia hates school: Miss Ffoliot is paranoid about over-close relationships between the girls. She does make one friend, bohemian Bridget Sholto, and in the holidays in London meets Bridget's brother James. Helen meanwhile learns that their step-sister Anne, 26, married to a perfectly nice compatible academic, is restless in her marriage (for the first time in Jones, perfect compatibility, a theme of earlier novels, is not enough). This shakes all Helen's beliefs: whom, then, should one marry? What's the point of going to Cambridge and finding suitable male-friends? Their step-brother Cathcart, 30, meanwhile, has become besotted, in society London, with a friend's sister, the beautiful rich Pamela Wake, who won't have him; but in the course of a visit to the Wakes with Cathcart, Helen meets Pamela's brother Conrad Wake, who is impressed by her and invites her to Scotland. There he proposes marriage; Helen accepts him and decides not to go up to Cambridge. Felicia is torn: afraid of losing Helen but struck by Conrad, who is rich, handsome, wise, kind – and who drives a long sleek powerful motor car. Helen and Conrad are happily married, though Helen worries that they are so different – she is endlessly analytical and loves mutual confidences, he is the strong silent country type. When Felicia, now 17, visits them in their big country house in Wiltshire, Conrad notices her grace and her love of riding and the country. At 18 Felicia leaves boarding-school early and joins a dance-school in London where James Sholto is the only male student. In London she attracts the attention of predatory men and is rescued by James. One day, now 19, she is off to visit the Sholtos, when a long sleek powerful motor car passes by in the street. On impulse she takes a train to the country to visit Helen and Conrad, back from their holidays, but finds only Conrad at home (Helen has stayed on with friends). He hosts her with perfect gentlemanly tact and hospitality; indeed he is so wonderful (a sort English Dick Diver) she feels uncomfortable and feels she must leave. Later she confesses to Helen, now 22, that she finds Conrad very attractive. Helen sees that Conrad is also in love with Felicia, though Conrad and Helen are happy with and sure of one another. "It's not natural to be chaste" thinks Helen. "She ought to have love affairs; she's nineteen and a half." Wanting Felicia to live with them and not feel uncomfortable, she lets Felicia know that "nothing could ever come between us" (the two sisters) and that "we must take what pleasure we can". She generously absents herself, and in the interval, in a passage of great beauty and delicate symbolism (the setting is summer), Conrad takes Felicia's virginity. The novel ends with the two sisters and Conrad in a blissful ménage-à-trois.

=== Morning and Cloud (1932) ===
Set in London and the West Riding of Yorkshire, 1930. Returning from work, Cedric Benton (ex-Harrow and Cambridge) contemplates his wife's light, spacious, tastefully-decorated house in Hampstead. He had married tall rich cool Bride Palliser, now 28, after a brief holiday romance four years earlier. They have two little boys. Theirs is a marriage of non-communication: Bride avoids talk of feelings. When she and her brother Johnnie were small, their mother Gertrude had walked out and remarried; now, newly widowed, Gertrude returns. In tow she has a niece of her second husband, small crop-headed Anthea Ridley, 22. (Anthea was orphaned early and grew up with cousins in a vicarage in the Yorkshire dales. She studied at the Slade and is now an artist; but she is poor, has no studio and is dependent on infrequent hand-outs from mean Aunt Gertrude, who has purloined her inheritance.) Invited to Cedric and Bride's, Anthea is surprised to find one of her paintings there, bought (by coincidence) by Bride at an exhibition. To help her, Bride commissions Anthea to decorate the children's nursery with murals. Bride's brother Johnnie, 26, falls under Anthea's spell and starts inviting her out, but his proposal of marriage disappoints her: she wants an affair.

The rush of her attraction to him would undoubtedly have carried her eager and unreflecting over the bar of her virginity, had Johnnie not been restrained by fealty to a code which she did not recognise... The warm, quick natural outflow of her sexual nature towards him was checked, thwarted, turned back upon itself.

Cedric and Anthea meanwhile enjoy talking while she paints: her receptiveness reawakens his interest in existence. She is puzzled, however, by Bride, wondering how a person who appears to be so uninteresting can "produce in her surroundings an effect so satisfying: it was strange that dullness and evasion should translate themselves into order, serenity and formal beauty". The murals done, in the summer holidays Anthea visits her cousins in the dales. Johnnie pursues her there. He is now ready for an affair, but she has cooled. She rebuffs him. Experiencing "the blank heavy sickness of loss", he leaves. Feeling guilty and needing someone to talk to, she writes to Cedric, who makes some excuse to Bride, cuts short his holiday in France, and motors to Yorkshire. They walk up into the hills and confess their love for each other. Anthea leads him up a ravine to a waterfall with rock-pools and strips naked. Back in London, Anthea leaves her aunt, takes a dingy bedsit, and finds work as a drawing-teacher. She and Cedric are now lovers. He tells Bride he is in love with Anthea; Bride has been expecting the news and receives it in silent distress. Cedric is wrong-footed by her refusal to talk. "When we plan to inflict pain, we know not what we do; and when, coming to the very act, a partial knowledge is forced upon us, it is sometimes the aggressor who is stunned." Her strategy is to give him time to get over his passion. Anthea had expected Cedric to leave Bride; she has over-estimated Cedric's love for her. Under the strain of uncertainty, isolation and poverty – she has not yet received her first salary – she falls ill in her garret. Cedric, socially busy as ever, is slow to visit her. When he finally does, she asks only that he tries to see her from time to time. She awakens next day feeling better and watches, as an artist, another dawn over the London rooftops, a violet scene of morning and cloud.

=== Overview and critical reception ===
"Perhaps the best part of this intricate and fascinating book is the description of Inigo's life at Cambridge. There, in the artificial constriction of University life, Miss Jones's talent for playing cat's-cradle with human relationships comes into its own; and, since hypersensitiveness is a mark of adolescence, Inigo's absorption in it gains a validity. ... His preoccupation with sincerity, in himself and others: how admirably Miss Jones depicts it, the self-examination, half humorous and half agonized, the desire to do everyone justice, even one's self."

– From a review of Inigo Sandys by L. P. Hartley, The Spectator, 29 March 1924

The novels are notable for their subtle presentation of (often failing) love-relationships among the cultivated middle class, for their frank 'Cambridge-salon' type dialogue, and for their sensitive evocations of English settings. They were, for the most part, experimental and modernist in their attitudes and subject-matter rather than their narrative technique or form. They generally use chronological, 'slanted' third-person narration, without intrusive authorial voice, and naturalistic settings. There are, however – the one exception – some stream-of-consciousness passages in Inigo Sandys (1924), using the second person, an alter ego of Inigo himself.. "Inigo Sandys is refined to the point of attenuation," remarked Isabel Paterson, "subtle, but quite un-complex; a subtlety achieved by the most drastic eliminations." "The whole thing is well done," wrote Forrest Reid of this novel, "but the Cambridge scenes are particularly happy. Here the story is presented almost entirely by suggestion – a word, a picture – just what is sufficient to set us in possession of the strange little drama that preludes so oddly the larger drama of the world outside."

"She has a beautiful visual gift," wrote Rebecca West in the New Statesman of Quiet Interior (1920), "and a sense of character that can be brilliant or touching." Katherine Mansfield, reviewing this novel in the Athenaeum, admired her "distinction of style". Llewellyn Jones, writing in the Denver Rocky, found Caroline's story in The Singing Captives (1921) less poignant than Claire's in Quiet Interior (a novel he admired), but "All sensitive readers will enter into the feelings of Caroline as they did those of Claire, and know them for the deeply genuine feelings that they are. It is in their very quietness and lack of sensationalism that the real excitement and beauty of these two novels resides. There is in neither any negation of day or of sun, no nostalgia for night." (Note: A reference to Virginia Woolf's novel Night and Day (1919).)

"Readers may approach The Wedgwood Medallion with the assurance that they will find there all those distinguished qualities that made this author's previous efforts so notable. There is the same delightful precision in character-drawing, the same unstrained sequence of events moving with a lifelike reality, and the same subtle illumination of the moods and varying natures of men and women. Miss Jones possesses that desirable faculty of revealing characters with such a high degree of simplicity that they seem to walk right into the reader's life."

– The New York Times review by John T. McIntyre of The Wedgwood Medallion, 11 March 1923

Jones's gifts, among them her wit, were sometimes likened to those of Jane Austen, but Jones considered Austen narrow and was lukewarm about the comparison. The Cambridge Review found in The Wedgwood Medallion (1923) "all the qualities which an earlier generation associates with George Eliot". John T. McIntyre, reviewing this novel in The New York Times, considered it finer than its two predecessors. "This is a book in which characterization is paramount and it does not so much matter what twists the action takes; one can always follow the characters themselves with enjoyment... Miss Jones assuredly deserves classification with Sheila Kaye-Smith and Katherine Mansfield. They are all naturalists of the best type, painting contemporary life with uncommon skill and with a suppression of strained effects."

"Jones is no end clever and adroit in her phrasing," wrote New York Bookman reviewer, John Macy, of Helen and Felicia (1927). "She has her own kind of sparkle and keenness and again and again delights you with her sleek supple phrases. But she pitches her tale on a normal subdued naturalistic plane. If you think that women do not understand women and men too, read this. It seems to me to have the validity of good sane novel-writing, and to have also the new liberties and vivacities of today. By normal and natural I mean a story that just seems to have happened that way." The Roman Catholic reviewer, Marc-André Raffalovich, writing in the Dominican journal Blackfriars under the pseudonym Alexander Michaelson, condemned the "immoral theories" implied by the novel's ending: "Remove chastity from the virtues, exalt conceit, and then write Helen and Felicia." He considered Jones typical of "our clever (in the worst sense of the word) – too clever – women novelists, so sensitive to the charms of nature and of art, of human relationships and of animal favourites, so obtuse, so stupid in the vicinity of sin."

L. A. G. Strong, writing in The Spectator, considered Jones's last novel, Morning and Cloud (1932), "the best thing [she] has yet done. She sets herself the problem of a familiar situation, a small scale, and very little action. The situation is newly seen, the few characters carefully studied, the lack of action never felt as a drawback. The skill and delicacy with which Miss Jones handles this situation deserves high praise." Her friend Carrington (who called her "Toppers") also thought Morning and Cloud her finest novel. Its first print-run, in January 1932, quickly sold out; a second impression was published in the following month.

== Literary criticism ==
"Let's start with the shelves by the fire-place. Dorothy Richardson – Virginia Woolf – E. B. C. Jones – May Sinclair – Katherine Mansfield – the modern female writers are well represented, aren't they?"

– Lord Peter Wimsey scanning Ann Dorland's bookshelves in Dorothy Sayers' The Unpleasantness at the Bellona Club (1928), p. 140

Jones reread the novels of Virginia Woolf and E. M. Forster (both writers known to her personally) for her most important essay in literary criticism, 'E. M. Forster and Virginia Woolf' in The English Novelists; a survey of the novel by twenty contemporary novelists, ed. Derek Verschoyle (Chatto & Windus, 1936). As well as discussing the techniques and themes of the two novelists, their strengths and weaknesses, she chose to focus on their treatment of personal relations and sex. "There is one resemblance to be noted between Virginia Woolf and Forster," she wrote, "and this is the impression made by their novels of half-heartedness about sexual love... An author has a perfect right to make a character frigid, but the reader should feel confident that it was deliberate... Seldom has love without manifest sex been treated with such insidious enthusiasm."
