= The Fountainhead =

1943 novel by Ayn Rand

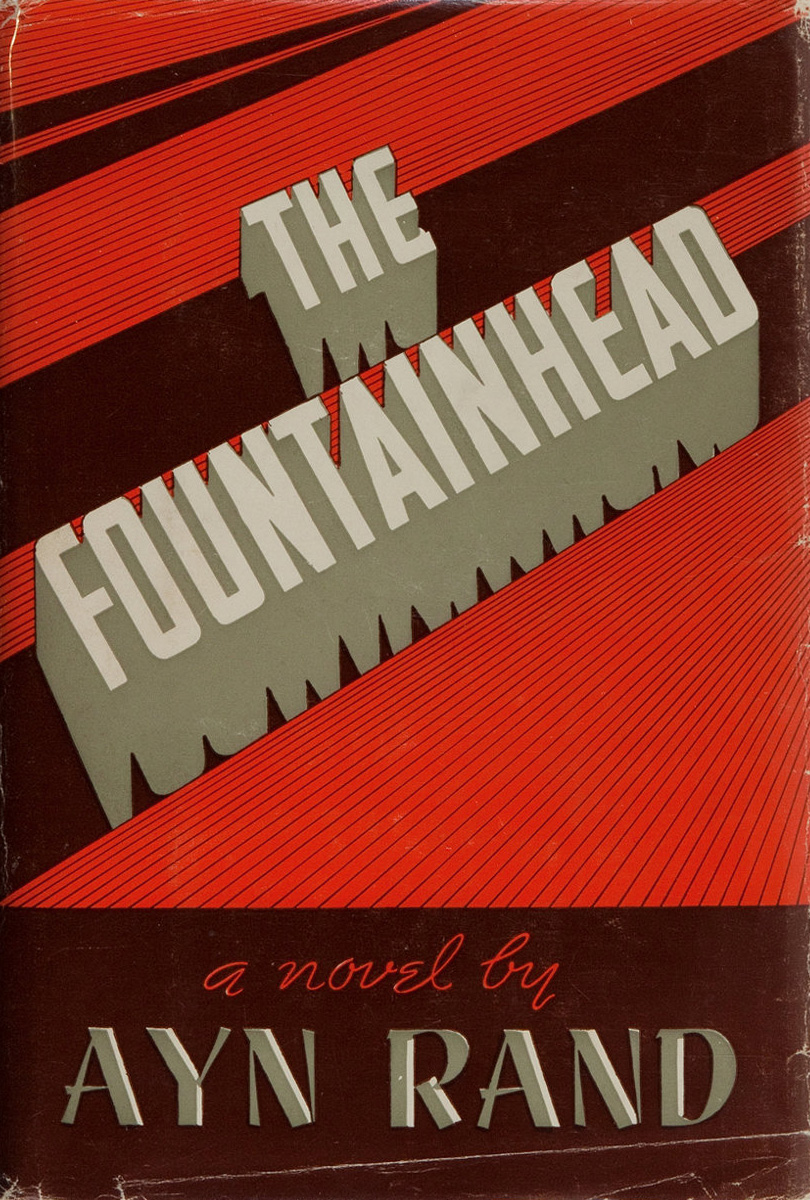
- Cover of the first edition
- Author: Ayn Rand
- Language: English
- Genre: Philosophical fiction
- Publisher: Bobbs Merrill
- Publication date: May 7, 1943
- Publication place: United States
- Media type: Print
- Pages: 753 (1st edition)
- OCLC: 300033023

The Fountainhead is a 1943 novel by Russian-born American author Ayn Rand, her first major literary success. The novel's protagonist, Howard Roark, is an intransigent young architect who battles against conventional standards and refuses to compromise with an architectural establishment unwilling to accept innovation. Roark embodies what Rand believed to be the ideal man, and his struggle reflects Rand's belief that individualism is superior to collectivism.

Roark is opposed by what he calls "second-handers", who value conformity over independence and integrity. These include Roark's former classmate, Peter Keating, who succeeds by following popular styles, but turns to Roark for help with design problems. Ellsworth Toohey, a socialist architecture critic who uses his influence to promote his political and social agenda, tries to destroy Roark's career. Tabloid newspaper publisher Gail Wynand seeks to shape popular opinion; he befriends Roark, then betrays him when public opinion turns in a direction he cannot control. The novel's most controversial character is Roark's lover, Dominique Francon. She believes that non-conformity has no chance of winning, so she alternates between helping Roark and working to undermine him.

Twelve publishers rejected the manuscript before an editor at the Bobbs-Merrill Company risked his job to get it published. Contemporary reviewers' opinions were polarized. Some praised the novel as a powerful paean to individualism, while others thought it overlong and lacking sympathetic characters. Initial sales were slow, but the book gained a following by word of mouth and became a bestseller. More than 10 million copies of The Fountainhead have been sold worldwide, and it has been translated into more than 30 languages. The novel attracted a new following for Rand and has enjoyed a lasting influence, especially among architects, entrepreneurs, American conservatives, and libertarians.

The novel has been adapted into other media several times. An illustrated version was syndicated in newspapers in 1945. Warner Bros. produced a film version in 1949; Rand wrote the screenplay, and Gary Cooper played Roark. Critics panned the film, which did not recoup its budget; several directors and writers have considered developing a new film adaptation. In 2014 Belgian theater director Ivo van Hove created a stage adaptation, which received mixed reviews.

== Plot ==
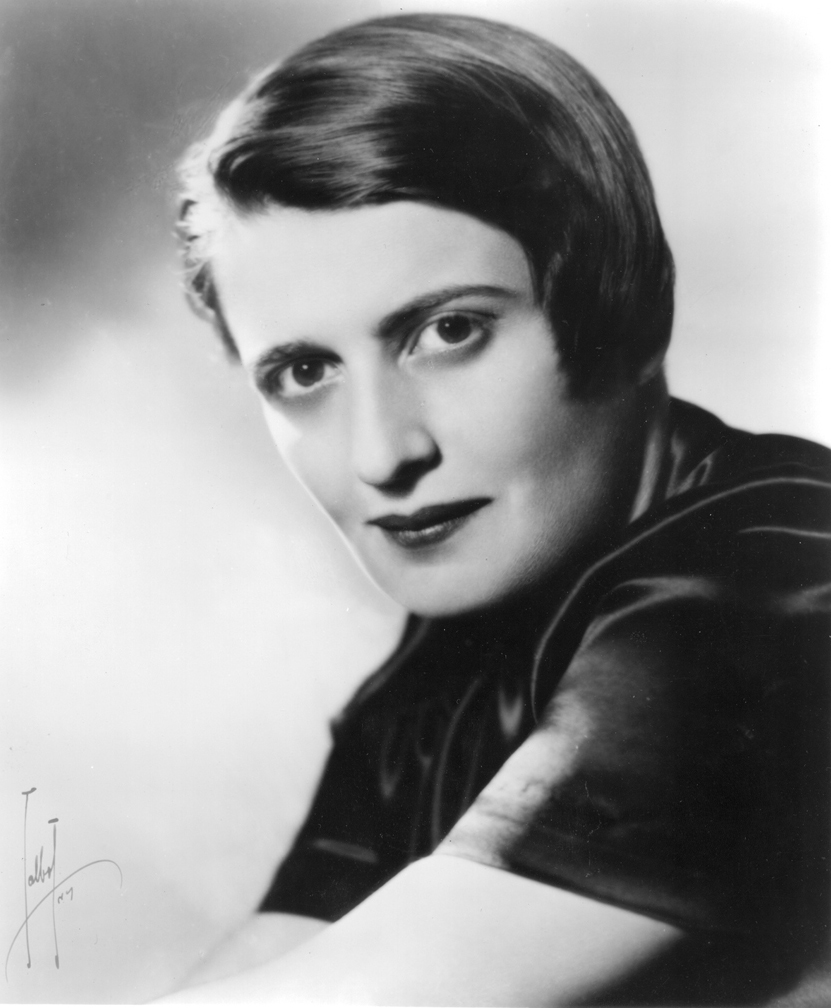
Ayn Rand in 1943

In early 1922, Howard Roark is expelled from the architecture department of the Stanton Institute of Technology because he has not adhered to the school's preference for historical convention in building design. Roark goes to New York City and gets a job with Henry Cameron. Cameron was once a renowned architect, but now gets few commissions. In the meantime, Roark's popular but vacuous fellow student and housemate Peter Keating (whom Roark sometimes helped with projects) graduates with high honors. He too moves to New York, where he has been offered a position with the prestigious architecture firm, Francon & Heyer. Keating ingratiates himself with Guy Francon and works to remove rivals among his coworkers. After Francon's partner, Lucius Heyer, suffers a fatal stroke brought on by Keating's antagonism, Francon chooses Keating to replace him. Meanwhile, Roark and Cameron create inspired work, but struggle financially.

After Cameron retires, Keating hires Roark, whom Francon soon fires for refusing to design a building in the classical style. Roark works briefly at another firm, then opens his own office but has trouble finding clients and closes it down. He gets a job in a granite quarry owned by Francon. There he meets Francon's daughter Dominique, a columnist for The New York Banner, while she is staying at her family's estate nearby. They are immediately attracted to each other, leading to a rough sexual encounter that Dominique later calls a rape. Shortly after, Roark is notified that a client is ready to start a new building, and he returns to New York. Dominique also returns to New York and learns that Roark is an architect. She attacks his work in public, but visits him for secret sexual encounters.

Ellsworth M. Toohey, who writes a popular architecture column in the Banner, is an outspoken socialist who shapes public opinion through his column and a circle of influential associates. Toohey sets out to destroy Roark through a smear campaign. He recommends Roark to Hopton Stoddard, a wealthy acquaintance who wants to build a Temple of the Human Spirit. Roark's unusual design includes a nude statue modeled on Dominique; Toohey persuades Stoddard to sue Roark for malpractice. Toohey and several architects (including Keating) testify at the trial that Roark is incompetent as an architect for his rejection of historical styles. Dominique also argues for the prosecution in tones that can be interpreted to be speaking more in Roark's defense than for the plaintiff, but he loses the case. Dominique decides that since she cannot have the world she wants, in which men like Roark are recognized for their greatness, she will live entirely in the world she has, which shuns Roark and praises Keating. She marries Keating and turns herself over to him, doing and saying whatever he wants, and actively persuading potential clients to hire him instead of Roark.

To win Keating a prestigious commission offered by Gail Wynand, the owner and editor-in-chief of the Banner, Dominique agrees to sleep with Wynand. Wynand is so strongly attracted to Dominique that he pays Keating to divorce her, after which Wynand and Dominique marry. Wanting to build a home for himself and his new wife, Wynand discovers that Roark designed every building he likes and so hires him. Roark and Wynand become close friends; Wynand is unaware of Roark's past relationship with Dominique.

Washed up and out of the public eye, Keating pleads with Toohey to use his influence to get the commission for the much-sought-after Cortlandt housing project. Keating knows his most successful projects were aided by Roark, so he asks for Roark's help in designing Cortlandt. Roark agrees in exchange for complete anonymity and Keating's promise that it will be built exactly as designed. After taking a long vacation with Wynand, Roark returns to find that Keating was not able to prevent major changes from being made in Cortlandt's construction. Roark dynamites the project to prevent the subversion of his vision.

Roark is arrested and his action is widely condemned, but Wynand decides to use his papers to defend his friend. This unpopular stance hurts the circulation of his newspapers, and Wynand's employees go on strike after Wynand dismisses Toohey for disobeying him and criticizing Roark. Faced with the prospect of closing the paper, Wynand gives in and publishes a denunciation of Roark. At his trial, Roark makes a lengthy speech about the value of ego and integrity, and he is found not guilty. Dominique leaves Wynand for Roark. Wynand, who has betrayed his own values by attacking Roark, finally grasps the nature of the power he thought he held. He shuts down the Banner and commissions a final building from Roark, a skyscraper that will serve as a monument to human achievement. Eighteen months later, the Wynand Building is under construction. Dominique, now Roark's wife, enters the site to meet him atop its steel framework.

== Major characters ==
=== Howard Roark ===
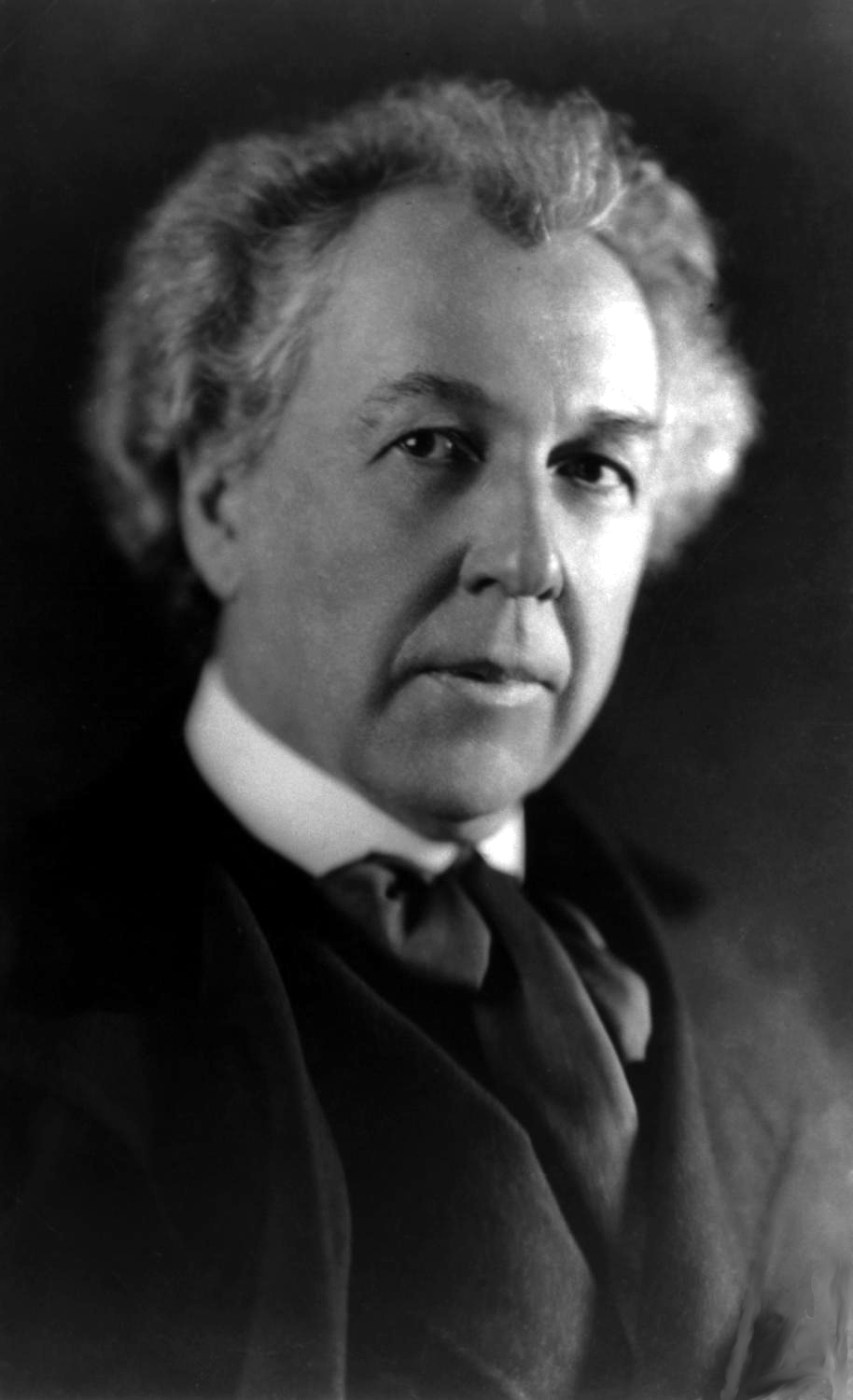
In writing the character of Howard Roark, Rand was inspired by the architect Frank Lloyd Wright.

Rand's stated goal in writing fiction was to portray her vision of an ideal man. The character of Howard Roark, the protagonist of The Fountainhead, was the first instance where she believed she had achieved this. Roark embodies Rand's egoistic moral ideals, especially the virtues of independence and integrity.

The character of Roark was at least partly inspired by American architect Frank Lloyd Wright. Rand described the inspiration as limited to specific ideas he had about architecture and "the pattern of his career". She denied that Wright had anything to do with the philosophy expressed by Roark or the events of the plot. Rand's denials have not stopped commentators from claiming stronger connections between Wright and Roark. Wright equivocated about whether he thought Roark was based on him, sometimes implying that he did, at other times denying it. Wright biographer Ada Louise Huxtable described significant differences between Wright's philosophy and Rand's and quoted him declaring, "I deny the paternity and refuse to marry the mother." Architecture critic Martin Filler said that Roark resembles the Swiss-French modernist architect Le Corbusier more closely than Wright.

=== Peter Keating ===
In contrast to the individualistic Roark, Peter Keating is a conformist who bases his choices on what others want. Introduced to the reader as Roark's classmate in architecture school, two years ahead of him, Keating does not really want to be an architect. He loves painting, but his mother steers him toward architecture instead. In this, as in all his decisions, Keating does what others expect rather than follow his personal interests. He becomes a social climber, focused on improving his career and social standing using a combination of personal manipulation and conformity to popular styles. He follows a similar path in his private life: he chooses a loveless marriage to Dominique instead of marrying the woman he loves—who lacks Dominique's beauty and social connections. By middle age, Keating's career is in decline and he is unhappy with his path, but it is too late for him to change.

Rand did not use a specific architect as a model for Keating. Her inspiration for the character came from a neighbor she knew while working in Hollywood in the early 1930s. Rand asked this young woman to explain her goals in life. The woman's response was focused on social comparisons: The neighbor wanted her material possessions and social standing to equal or exceed those of other people. Rand created Keating as an archetype of this motivation, which she saw as the opposite of self-interest.

=== Dominique Francon ===
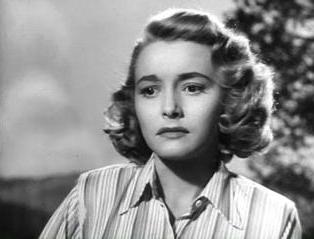
Patricia Neal played Dominique Francon in the film adaptation.

Dominique Francon is the heroine of The Fountainhead, described by Rand as "the woman for a man like Howard Roark". Rand described Dominique as similar to herself "in a bad mood". For most of the novel, the character operates from a mistaken belief that a corrupt world will destroy the things she values. Believing that the values she admires cannot survive in the real world, she chooses to turn away from them so that the world cannot harm her. Only at the end of the novel does she accept that she can be happy and survive.

=== Gail Wynand ===
Gail Wynand is a wealthy newspaper mogul who rose from a destitute childhood in the ghettoes of New York (Hell's Kitchen) to control much of the city's print media. While Wynand shares many of the character qualities of Roark, his success is dependent upon his ability to pander to public opinion. Rand presents this as a tragic flaw that eventually leads to his downfall. In her journals Rand described Wynand as "the man who could have been" a heroic individualist, contrasting him to Roark, "the man who can be and is". Some elements of Wynand's character were inspired by real-life newspaper tycoon William Randolph Hearst, including Hearst's yellow journalism and mixed success in attempts to gain political influence. Wynand ultimately fails in his attempts to wield power, losing his newspaper, his wife (Dominique), and his friendship with Roark. The character has been interpreted as a representation of the master morality described by philosopher Friedrich Nietzsche; his tragic nature illustrates Rand's rejection of Nietzsche's philosophy. In Rand's view, a person like Wynand, who seeks power over others, is as much a "second-hander" as a conformist such as Keating.

=== Ellsworth Toohey ===
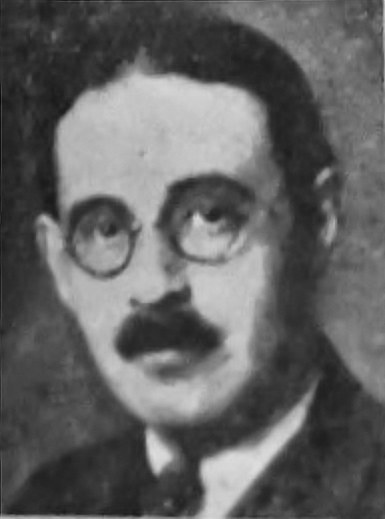
Harold Laski was one of Rand's inspirations for the character of Ellsworth Toohey.

Ellsworth Monkton Toohey is Roark's antagonist. He is Rand's personification of evil—the most active and self-aware villain in any of her novels. Toohey is a socialist and represents the spirit of collectivism more generally. He styles himself as representative of the will of the masses but his actual desire is for power over others. He controls individual victims by destroying their sense of self-worth and seeks broader power (over "the world", as he declares to Keating in a moment of candor) by promoting the ideals of ethical altruism and a rigorous egalitarianism that treats all people and achievements as equally valuable. Rand used her memory of Harold Laski, a democratic socialist politician and future British Labour Party chairman, to help her imagine what Toohey would do in a given situation. She attended a New York lecture by Laski as part of gathering material for the novel, following which she changed the physical appearance of the character to be similar to that of Laski. New York intellectuals Lewis Mumford and Clifton Fadiman also helped inspire the character.

== History ==
=== Background and development ===
When Rand first arrived in New York as an immigrant from the Soviet Union in 1926, she was greatly impressed by the Manhattan skyline's towering skyscrapers, which she saw as symbols of freedom, and resolved that she would write about them. In 1927, Rand was working as a junior screenwriter for movie producer Cecil B. DeMille when he asked her to write a script for what would become the 1928 film Skyscraper. The original story by Dudley Murphy was about two construction workers working on a skyscraper who are rivals for a woman's love. Rand rewrote it, transforming the rivals into architects. One of them, Howard Kane, was an idealist dedicated to erecting the skyscraper despite enormous obstacles. The film would have ended with Kane standing atop the completed skyscraper. DeMille rejected Rand's script, and the completed film followed Murphy's original idea. Rand's version contained elements she would use in The Fountainhead.

In 1928, Rand made notes for a proposed, but never written, novel titled The Little Street. Rand's notes for it contain elements that carried over into her work on The Fountainhead. David Harriman, who edited the notes for the posthumously published Journals of Ayn Rand (1997), described the story's villain as a preliminary version of the character Ellsworth Toohey, and this villain's assassination by the protagonist as prefiguring the attempted assassination of Toohey.

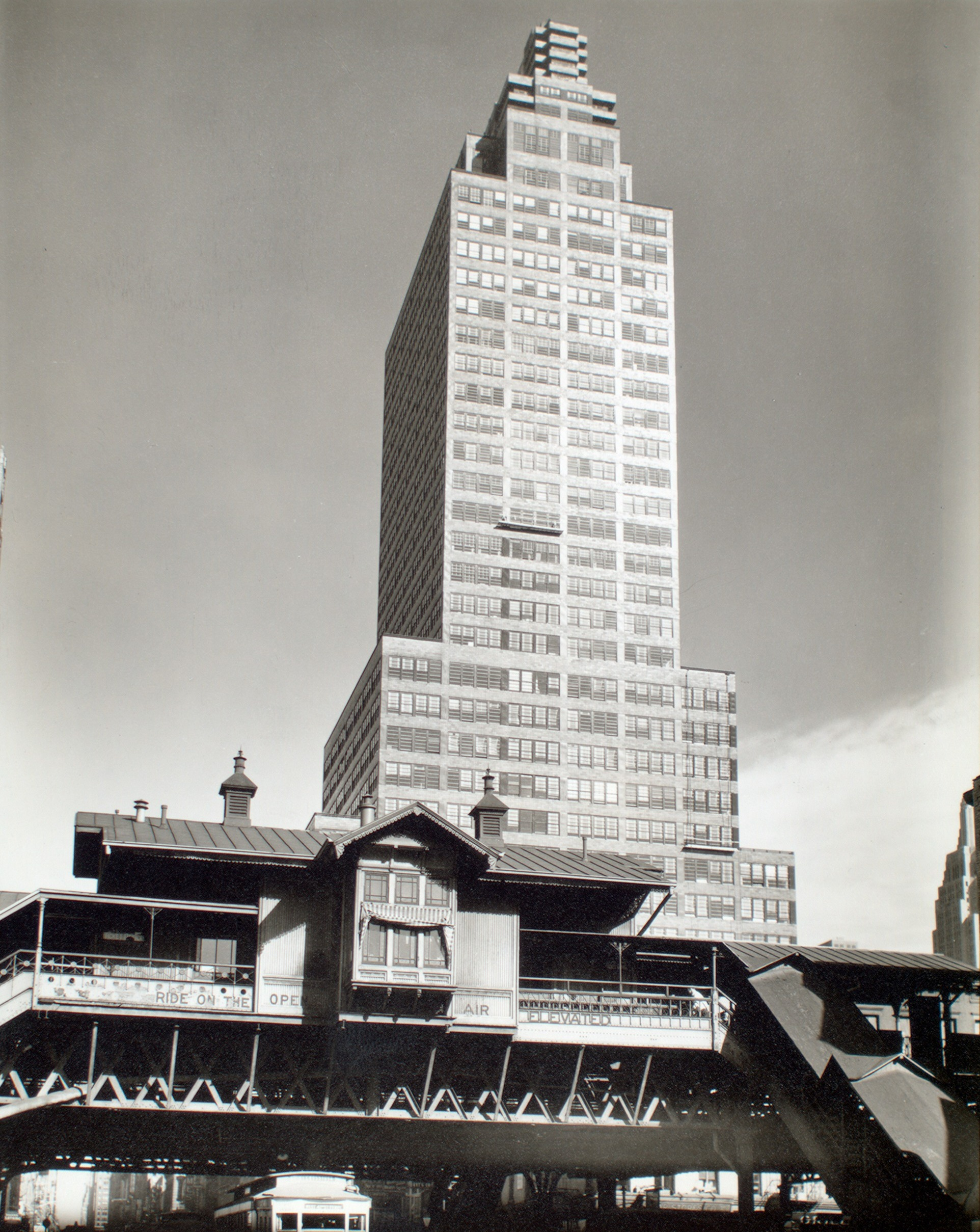
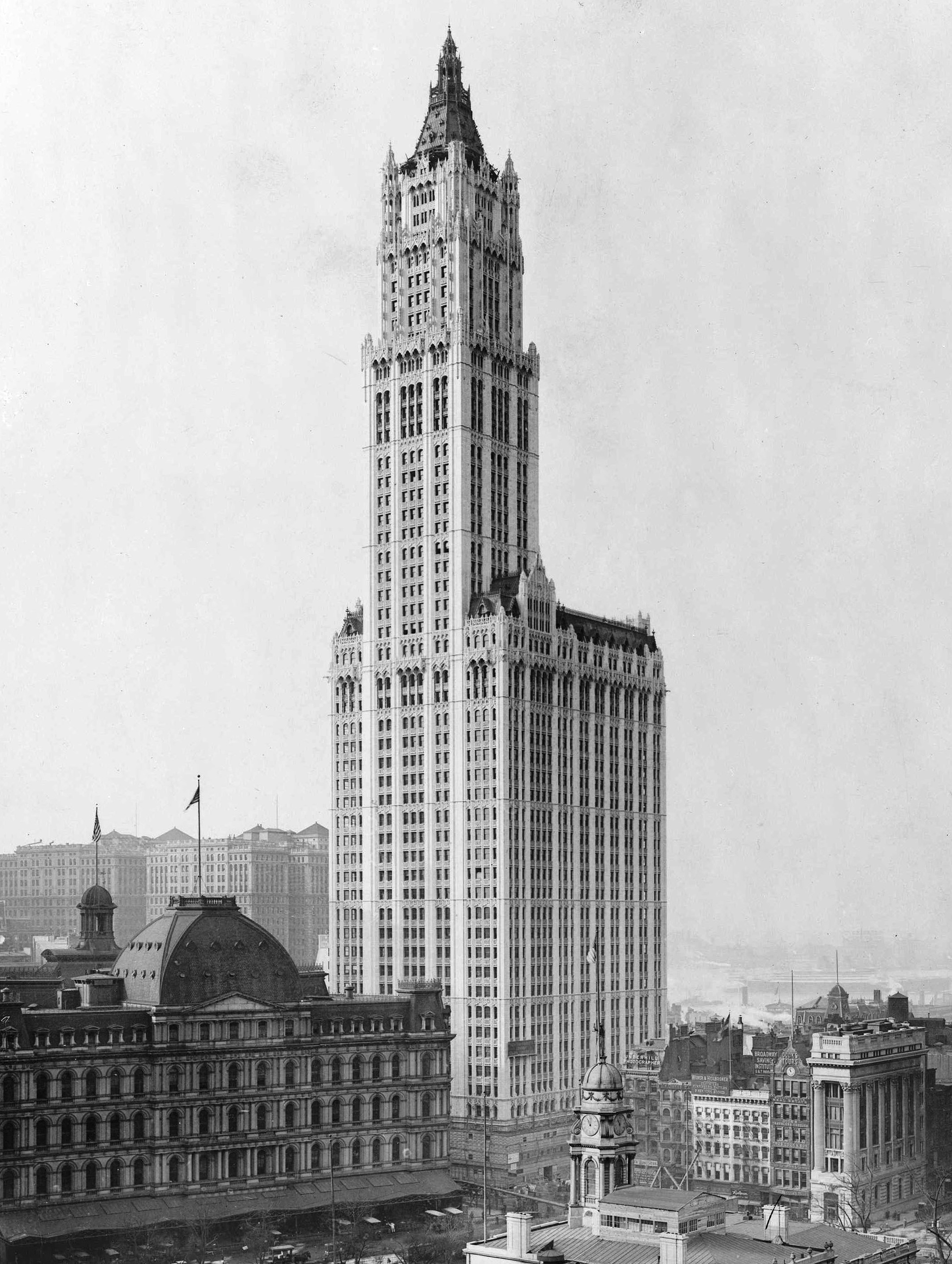
New York skyscrapers such as the McGraw Hill Building (left) and the Woolworth Building (right) inspired Rand to write a novel about architecture.

Rand began The Fountainhead (originally titled Second-Hand Lives) following the completion of her first novel, We the Living, in 1934. That earlier novel was based in part on people and events familiar to Rand; the new novel, on the other hand, focused on the less-familiar world of architecture. She therefore conducted extensive research that included reading many biographies and other books about architecture. She also worked as an unpaid typist in the office of architect Ely Jacques Kahn. Rand began her notes for the new novel in December 1935.

Rand wanted to write a novel that was less overtly political than We the Living, to avoid being viewed as "a 'one-theme' author". As she developed the story, she began to see more political meaning in the novel's ideas about individualism. Rand also planned to introduce the novel's four sections with quotes from Friedrich Nietzsche, whose ideas had influenced her own intellectual development, but she eventually decided that Nietzsche's ideas were too different from hers. She edited the final manuscript to remove the quotes and other allusions to him.

Rand's work on The Fountainhead was repeatedly interrupted. In 1937, she took a break from it to write a novella called Anthem. One night in June 1938, she almost gave up on writing the book. Her husband Frank O'Connor encouraged her in an hours-long conversation, ultimately convincing her not to give up. She also completed a stage adaptation of We the Living that ran briefly in 1940. That same year, she became active in politics. She first worked as a volunteer in Wendell Willkie's presidential campaign and then attempted to form a group for conservative intellectuals. As her royalties from earlier projects ran out, she began doing freelance work as a script reader for movie studios. When Rand finally found a publisher, the novel was only one-third complete.

=== Publication history ===
Although she was a previously published novelist and had a successful Broadway play, Rand had difficulty finding a publisher for The Fountainhead. Macmillan Publishing, which had published We the Living, rejected the book after Rand insisted they provide more publicity for her new novel than they had done for the first one. Rand's agent began submitting the book to other publishers; in 1938, Knopf signed a contract to publish the book. When Rand was only a quarter done with the manuscript by October 1940, Knopf canceled her contract. Several other publishers rejected the book. When Rand's agent began to criticize the novel, Rand fired the agent and decided to handle submissions herself. Twelve publishers (including Macmillan and Knopf) rejected the book.

While Rand was working as a script reader for Paramount Pictures, her boss put her in touch with the Bobbs-Merrill Company. A recently hired editor, Archibald Ogden, liked the book, but two internal reviewers gave conflicting opinions. One said it was a great book that would never sell; the other said it was trash but would sell well. Ogden's boss, Bobbs-Merrill president D.L. Chambers, decided to reject the book. Ogden responded by wiring to the head office, "If this is not the book for you, then I am not the editor for you." His strong stand won Rand the contract on December 10, 1941. She also got a $1,000 advance so she could work full-time to complete the novel by January 1, 1943.

Rand worked long hours through 1942 to complete the final two-thirds of her manuscript, which she delivered on December 31, 1942. Rand's working title for the book was Second-Hand Lives, but Ogden pointed out that this emphasized the story's villains. Rand offered The Mainspring as an alternative, but this title had been recently used for another book. She then used a thesaurus and found 'fountainhead' as a synonym. The Fountainhead was published on May 7, 1943, with 7,500 copies in the first printing. Initial sales were slow, but they began to rise in late 1943, driven primarily by word of mouth. The novel began appearing on bestseller lists in 1944. It reached number six on The New York Times bestseller list in August 1945, over two years after its initial publication. By 1956, the hardcover edition sold over 700,000 copies. The first paperback edition was published by the New American Library in 1952.

A 25th anniversary edition was issued by the New American Library in 1971, including a new introduction by Rand. The cover of the twenty-fifth anniversary edition featured a painting by Frank O'Connor titled Man Also Rises. In 1993, a 50th anniversary edition from Bobbs-Merrill added an afterword by Rand's heir, Leonard Peikoff. The novel has been translated into more than 30 languages. (Note: According to the Ayn Rand Institute, The Fountainhead has been translated into Albanian, Bulgarian, Chinese, Croatian, Czech, Danish, Dutch, Estonian, French, German, Greek, Hebrew, Hungarian, Icelandic, Italian, Japanese, Korean, Lithuanian, Marathi, Mongolian, Norwegian, Polish, Portuguese, Romanian, Russian, Serbian, Slovenian, Spanish, Swedish, Turkish, Ukrainian, and Vietnamese.)

Some passages were removed from the text prior to publication; the most substantial concerns the relationship of Howard Roark with actress Vesta Dunning, a character that was cut from the finished novel. The deleted passages were published posthumously in The Early Ayn Rand in 1984.

== Themes ==
=== Individualism ===
Rand indicated that the primary theme of The Fountainhead was "individualism versus collectivism, not in politics but within a man's soul". Philosopher Douglas Den Uyl identified the individualism presented in the novel as being specifically of an American kind, portrayed in the context of that country's society and institutions. Apart from scenes such as Roark's courtroom defense of the American concept of individual rights, she avoided direct discussion of political issues. As historian James Baker described it, "The Fountainhead hardly mentions politics or economics, despite the fact that it was born in the 1930s. Nor does it deal with world affairs, although it was written during World War II. It is about one man against the system, and it does not permit other matters to intrude." Early drafts of the novel included more explicit political references, but Rand removed them from the finished text.

=== Architecture ===
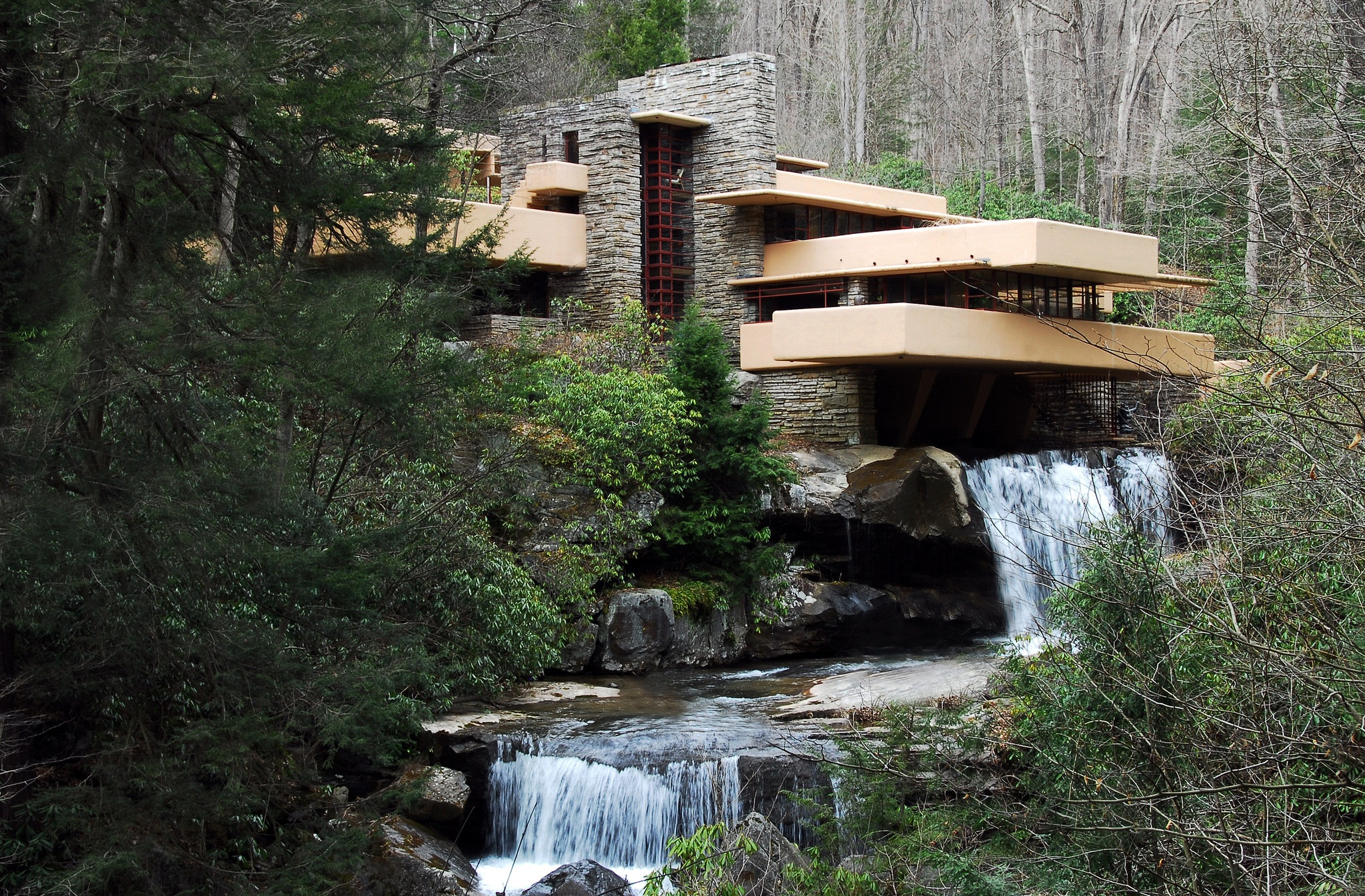
Rand's descriptions of Roark's buildings were inspired by the work of Frank Lloyd Wright, such as Fallingwater.

Rand chose the profession of architecture as the background for her novel, although she knew nothing about the field beforehand. As a field that combines art, technology, and business, it allowed her to illustrate her primary themes in multiple areas. Rand later wrote that architects provide "both art and a basic need of men's survival". In a speech to a chapter of the American Institute of Architects, Rand drew a connection between architecture and individualism, saying time periods that had improvements in architecture were also those that had more freedom for the individual.

Roark's modernist approach to architecture is contrasted with that of most of the other architects in the novel. In the opening chapter, the dean of his architecture school tells Roark that the best architecture must copy the past rather than innovate or improve. Roark repeatedly loses jobs with architectural firms and commissions from clients because he is unwilling to copy conventional architectural styles. In contrast, Keating's mimicry of convention brings him top honors in school and an immediate job offer. The same conflict between innovation and tradition is reflected in the career of Roark's mentor, Henry Cameron.

=== Philosophy ===
Den Uyl calls The Fountainhead a "philosophical novel", meaning that it addresses philosophical ideas and offers a specific philosophical viewpoint about those ideas. In the years following the publication of The Fountainhead, Rand developed a philosophical system that she called Objectivism. The Fountainhead does not contain this explicit philosophy, and Rand did not write the novel primarily to convey philosophical ideas. Nonetheless, Rand included three excerpts from the novel in For the New Intellectual, a 1961 collection of her writings that she described as an outline of Objectivism. Peikoff used many quotes and examples from The Fountainhead in his 1991 book on Rand's philosophy, Objectivism: The Philosophy of Ayn Rand.

== Reception and legacy ==
=== Critical reception ===
The Fountainhead polarized critics and received mixed reviews upon its release. In The New York Times, Lorine Pruette praised Rand as writing "brilliantly, beautifully and bitterly", stating that she had "written a hymn in praise of the individual" that would force readers to rethink basic ideas. Writing for the same newspaper, Orville Prescott called the novel "disastrous", with a plot containing "coils and convolutions" and a "crude cast of characters". Benjamin DeCasseres, a columnist for the New York Journal-American, described Roark as "one of the most inspiring characters in modern American literature". Rand sent DeCasseres a letter thanking him for explaining the book's themes about individualism when many other reviewers did not. There were other positive reviews, although Rand dismissed many of them as either not understanding her message or as being from unimportant publications. A number of negative reviews focused on the length of the novel, such as one that called it "a whale of a book" and another that said "anyone who is taken in by it deserves a stern lecture on paper-rationing". Other negative reviews called the characters unsympathetic and Rand's style "offensively pedestrian".

The character of Dominique Francon has provoked varied reactions from commentators. Philosopher Chris Matthew Sciabarra called her "one of the more bizarre characters in the novel". Literature scholar Mimi Reisel Gladstein called her "an interesting case study in perverseness". Writer Tore Boeckmann described her as a character with conflicting beliefs and saw her actions as a logical representation of how those conflicts might play out.

In the years following its initial publication, The Fountainhead has received relatively little attention from literary critics. Assessing the novel's legacy, philosopher Douglas Den Uyl described The Fountainhead as relatively neglected compared to her later novel Atlas Shrugged and said, "our problem is to find those topics that arise clearly with The Fountainhead and yet do not force us to read it simply through the eyes of Atlas Shrugged." Among critics who have addressed it, some consider The Fountainhead to be Rand's best novel, although in some cases this assessment is tempered by an overall negative judgment of Rand's writings. Purely negative evaluations have also continued; a 2011 overview of American literature said "mainstream literary culture dismissed [The Fountainhead] in the 1940s and continues to dismiss it".

=== Feminist criticisms ===
Feminist critics have condemned Roark and Dominique's first sexual encounter, accusing Rand of endorsing rape. Feminist critics have attacked the scene as representative of an antifeminist viewpoint in Rand's works that makes women subservient to men. Susan Brownmiller, in her 1975 work Against Our Will: Men, Women and Rape, denounced what she called "Rand's philosophy of rape", for portraying women as wanting "humiliation at the hands of a superior man". She called Rand "a traitor to her own sex". Susan Love Brown said the scene presents Rand's view of sex as sadomasochism involving "feminine subordination and passivity". Barbara Grizzuti Harrison suggested that women who enjoy such "masochistic fantasies" are "damaged" and have low self-esteem. While Mimi Reisel Gladstein found elements to admire in Rand's female protagonists, she said that readers who have "a raised consciousness about the nature of rape" would disapprove of Rand's "romanticized rapes".

Rand's posthumously published working notes for the novel indicate that when she started on the book in 1936, she conceived of Roark's character that "were it necessary, he could rape her and feel justified". She denied that what happened in the finished novel was actually rape, referring to it as "rape by engraved invitation". She said Dominique wanted and "all but invited" the act, citing, among other things, a passage where Dominique scratches a marble slab in her bedroom to invite Roark to repair it. A true rape, Rand said, would be "a dreadful crime". Defenders of the novel have agreed with this interpretation. In an essay specifically explaining this scene, Andrew Bernstein wrote that although much "confusion" exists about it, the descriptions in the novel provide "conclusive" evidence of Dominique's strong attraction to Roark and her desire to have sex with him. Individualist feminist Wendy McElroy said that while Dominique is "thoroughly taken", there is nonetheless "clear indication" that Dominique both gave consent for and enjoyed the experience. Both Bernstein and McElroy saw the interpretations of feminists such as Brownmiller as based in a false understanding of sexuality.

=== Effect on Rand's career ===
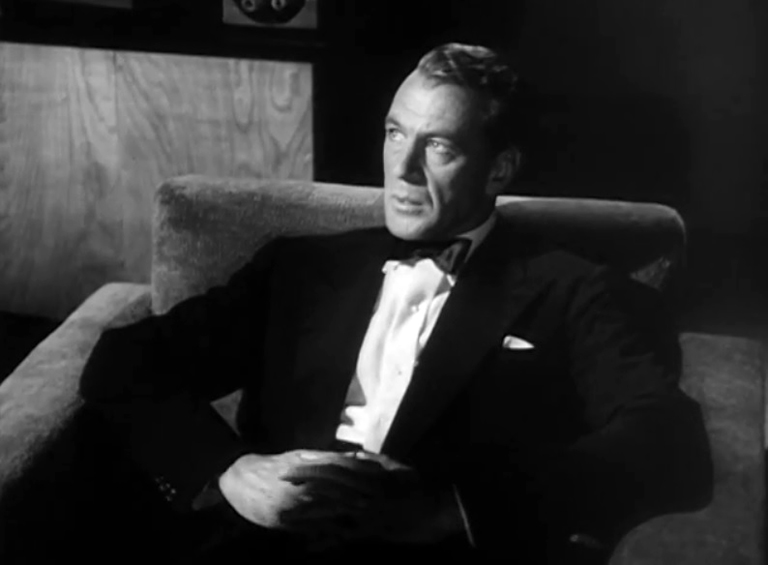
Gary Cooper played Howard Roark in the film adaptation.

Although Rand had some mainstream success previously with her play Night of January 16th and had two previously published novels, The Fountainhead was a major breakthrough in her career. It brought her lasting fame and financial success. She sold the movie rights to The Fountainhead and returned to Hollywood to write the screenplay for the adaptation. In April 1944, she signed a multiyear contract with movie producer Hal Wallis to write original screenplays and adaptations of other writers' works.

The success of the novel brought Rand new publishing opportunities. Bobbs-Merrill offered to publish a nonfiction book expanding on the ethical ideas presented in The Fountainhead. Though this book was never completed, a portion of the material was used for an article in the January 1944 issue of Reader's Digest. Rand was also able to get an American publisher for Anthem, which previously had been published in England, but not in the United States. When she was ready to submit Atlas Shrugged to publishers, over a dozen competed to acquire the new book.

The Fountainhead also attracted a new group of fans who were attracted to its philosophical ideas. When she moved back to New York in 1951, she gathered a group of these admirers to whom she referred publicly as "the Class of '43" in reference to the year The Fountainhead was published. The group evolved into the core of the Objectivist movement that promoted the philosophical ideas from Rand's writing.

=== Cultural influence ===
The Fountainhead has continued to have strong sales throughout the last century and into the current one. By 2023, it had sold over 10 million copies. It has been referred to in a variety of popular entertainments, including movies, television series, and other novels. The year 1943 also saw the publication of The God of the Machine by Isabel Paterson and The Discovery of Freedom by Rose Wilder Lane. Rand, Lane, and Paterson have been referred to as the founding mothers of the American libertarian movement with the publication of these works. For example, journalist John Chamberlain credited these works with converting him from socialism to what he called "an older American philosophy" of libertarian and conservative ideas. Literature professor Philip R. Yannella said the novel is "a central text of American conservative and libertarian political culture". In the United Kingdom, Conservative Party politician Sajid Javid has spoken of the novel's influence on him and how he regularly rereads the courtroom scene from Roark's criminal trial.

The book has a particular appeal to young people, an appeal that led historian James Baker to describe it as "more important than its detractors think, although not as important as Rand fans imagine". Philosopher Allan Bloom said the novel is "hardly literature" but that when he asked his students which books mattered to them, someone always was influenced by The Fountainhead. Journalist Nora Ephron wrote that she had loved the novel when she was 18, but admitted that she "missed the point", which she suggested is largely subliminal sexual metaphor. Ephron wrote that she decided upon rereading that "it is better read when one is young enough to miss the point. Otherwise, one cannot help thinking it is a very silly book."

Multiple architects have cited The Fountainhead as an inspiration for their work. Architect Fred Stitt, founder of the San Francisco Institute of Architecture, dedicated a book to his "first architectural mentor, Howard Roark". According to architectural photographer Julius Shulman, Rand's work "brought architecture into the public's focus for the first time". He said The Fountainhead was not only influential among 20th century architects, but moreover "was one, first, front and center in the life of every architect who was a modern architect". The novel also had a significant impact on the public perception of architecture. During his 2016 presidential campaign, real estate developer Donald Trump praised the novel, saying he identified with Roark. Roark Capital Group, a private equity firm, is named for the character Howard Roark.

== Adaptations ==
=== Film ===
In 1949, Warner Bros. released a film based on the book, starring Gary Cooper as Howard Roark, Patricia Neal as Dominique Francon, Raymond Massey as Gail Wynand, and Kent Smith as Peter Keating. Rand, who had previous experience as a screenwriter, was hired to adapt her own novel. The film was directed by King Vidor. It grossed $2.1 million, $400,000 less than its production budget. Critics panned the movie. Negative reviews appeared in publications ranging from newspapers such as The New York Times and the Los Angeles Times, to movie industry outlets such as Variety and The Hollywood Reporter, to magazines such as Time and Good Housekeeping.

In letters written at the time, Rand's reaction to the film was positive. She said it was the most faithful adaptation of a novel ever made in Hollywood. and a "real triumph". Sales of the novel increased as a result of interest spurred by the film. She displayed a more negative attitude later, saying she disliked the entire movie and complaining about its editing, acting, and other elements. Rand said she would never sell rights to another novel to a film company that did not allow her to pick the director and screenwriter, as well as edit the film.

Various filmmakers have expressed interest in doing new adaptations of The Fountainhead, although none of these potential films has begun production. In the 1970s, writer-director Michael Cimino entered a deal to film his own script for United Artists starring Clint Eastwood as Roark, but postponed the project in favor of abortive biographical films on Janis Joplin and Frank Costello. The deal collapsed after the failure of Cimino's 1980 film Heaven's Gate, which caused United Artists to refuse to finance any more of his films. Cimino continued to hope to film the script until his death in 2016.

In 1992, producer James Hill optioned the rights and selected Phil Joanou to direct. In the 2000s, Oliver Stone was interested in directing a new adaptation; Brad Pitt was reportedly under consideration to play Roark.

=== Play ===
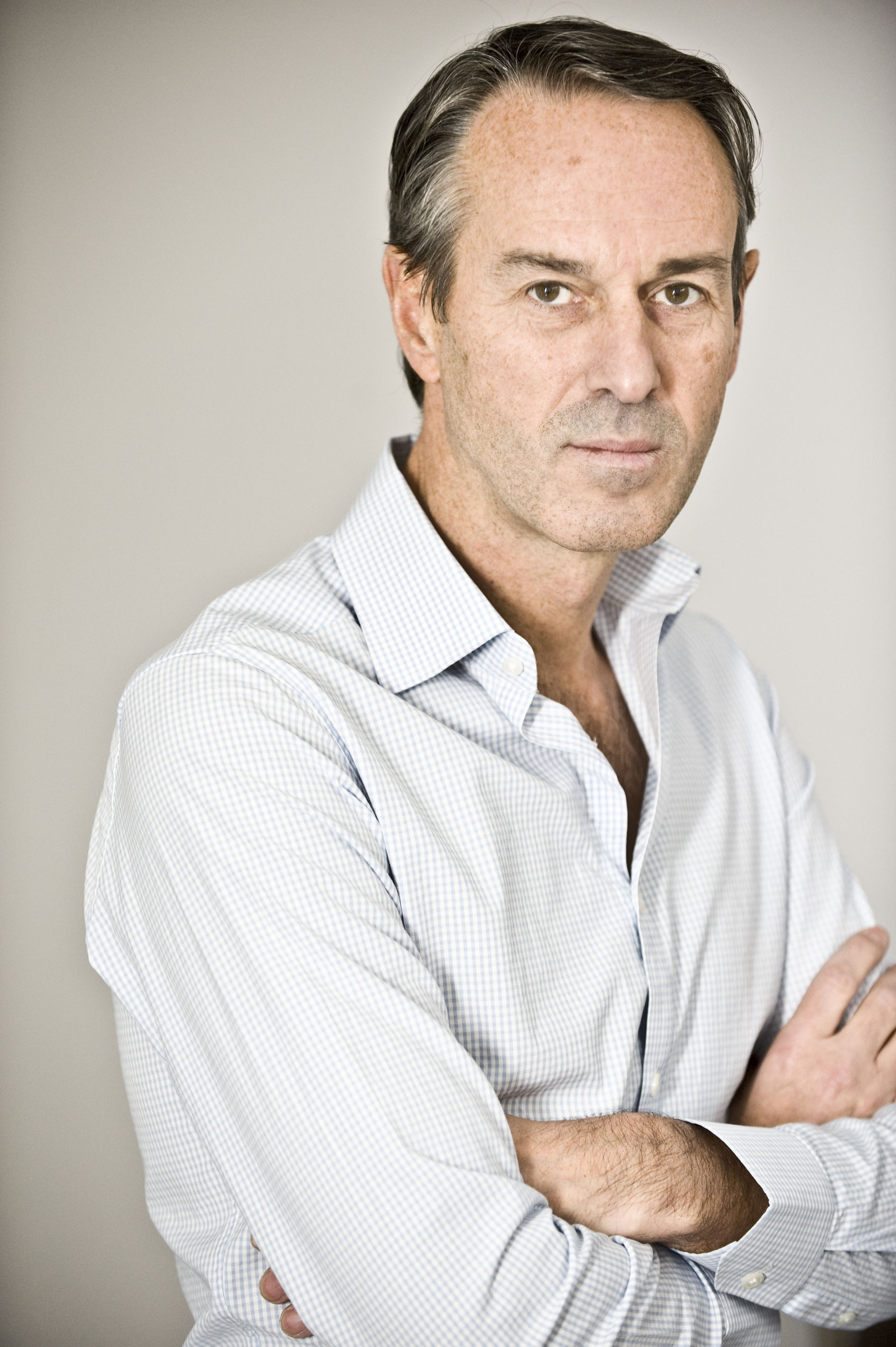
Ivo van Hove staged a theatrical adaptation of the novel.

The Dutch theater company Toneelgroep Amsterdam presented a Dutch-language adaptation for the stage at the Holland Festival in June 2014. The company's artistic director Ivo van Hove wrote and directed the adaptation. Ramsey Nasr played Howard Roark, with Halina Reijn playing Dominique Francon. The four-hour production used video projections to show close-ups of the actors and Roark's drawings, as well as backgrounds of the New York skyline. After its debut the production went on tour, appearing in Barcelona, Spain, in early July 2014, and at the Festival d'Avignon in France later that month. The play appeared at the Odéon-Théâtre de l'Europe in Paris in November 2016, and at the LG Arts Center in Seoul from March 31 to April 2, 2017. The play had its first American production at the Brooklyn Academy of Music's Next Wave Festival, where it ran from November 28 to December 2, 2017.

The European productions of the play received mostly positive reviews. The Festival d'Avignon production received positive from the French newspapers La Croix, Les Échos, and Le Monde, as well as from the British newspaper The Guardian, whose reviewer described it as "electrifying theatre". The French magazine Télérama gave the Avignon production a negative review, calling the source material a minor work and complaining about the use of video screens on the set, while another French magazine, La Terrasse, complimented the staging and acting of the Odéon production.

American critics gave mostly negative reviews of the Next Wave Festival production. Helen Shaw's review for The Village Voice said the adaptation was unwatchable because it portrayed Rand's characters and views seriously without undercutting them The reviewer for the Financial Times said the play was too long and that Hove had approached Rand's "noxious" book with too much reverence. In a mixed review for The New York Times, critic Ben Brantley complimented Hove for capturing Rand's "sheer pulp appeal", but described the material as "hokum with a whole lot of ponderous speeches". A review for The Huffington Post complimented van Hove's ability to portray Rand's message, but said the play was an hour too long.

=== Television ===
The novel was adapted in Urdu for the Pakistan Television Network in 1980 under the title Teesra Kinara. The serial starred Rahat Kazmi, who also wrote the adaptation. Kazmi's wife, Sahira Kazmi, played Dominique. In the US, the novel was parodied in an episode of the animated adventure series Mighty Mouse: The New Adventures, as well as in season 20 of the animated sitcom The Simpsons in the last part of the episode "Four Great Women and a Manicure".

=== Other adaptations ===
In 1944, Omnibook Magazine produced an abridged edition of the novel that was sold to members of the United States Armed Forces. Rand was annoyed that Bobbs-Merrill allowed the edited version to be published without her approval of the text. King Features Syndicate approached Rand the following year about creating a condensed, illustrated version of the novel for syndication in newspapers. Rand agreed, provided that she could oversee the editing and approve the proposed illustrations of her characters, which were provided by Frank Godwin. The 30-part series began on December 24, 1945, and ran in over 35 newspapers. Rand biographer Anne Heller complimented the adaptation, calling it "handsomely illustrated". To provide publicity for a translation of the novel into French, the Swiss publisher Jeheber allowed the Swiss Broadcasting Corporation to air a radio play adaptation in the late 1940s. Rand did not authorize the adaptation and learned about it through a letter from a Swiss fan in 1949.

== See also ==
- Architecture of the United States
- Romantic realism
- Ely Jacques Kahn
