= Llewellyn Jones =

Llewellyn Jones may refer to:

- Llewellyn Jones (writer)
- Llewellyn Jones (bishop)
- Llewellyn Jones (politician)

== See also ==
- Llewelyn Jones, Welsh rugby union player
