= Samuel Gardner Welles =

American journalist

Samuel Gardner Welles (1913–1981) was an American journalist for TIME magazine, author of Profile of Europe, and connected Whittaker Chambers to Raymond E. Murphy, whose investigation helped lead to Alger Hiss's departure from the State Department.

== Background ==
Samuel Gardner Welles was born in 1913. According to Chambers, "Samuel Gardner Welles... was the son of a reverend Episcopal clergyman (died 1940) and brother of bishop." His parents were Samuel Gardner Welles and Mabel De Geer of Cincinnati, Ohio; his brother was Edward Randolph Welles (1907–1991). In 1935, he graduated from Princeton University and was a Rhodes Scholar.

== Career ==
By the late 1930s, Welles was part of a group of young writers, many of them Herald Tribune employees and led by Isabel Paterson.

During World War II, Welles left TIME and joined the United States Department of State. In 1942, Welles put special investigator Raymond E. Murphy in touch with his TIME colleague Whittaker Chambers. (Murphy's investigations led to a report against Alger Hiss, who subsequently left State.) By 1944, Welles was serving as special assistant to H.E. John Gilbert Winant, US Ambassador to the United Kingdom.

Welles was a career journalist at TIME and LIFE. In 1947, Welles interviewed Polish Prince Prince Christopher Radziwill (Krzysztof Mikołaj Radziwiłł) while he was an associate editor and foreign news writer, based in Europe. In 1949, Welles visited Burma, which he described as "most distressful country that ever I have seen." In 1954, he was Chicago bureau chief for TIME, during which period he interviewed the Archbishop of Canterbury, Geoffrey Fisher. In 1959, he was a senior editor at LIFE.

== Personal life and death ==
Welles married Margery Miller; they had a daughter and two sons.

Samuel Gardner Welles aged 67 or 68 died in 1981.

== Works ==
While stationed in Europe for TIME, Welles wrote Profile of Europe, noted by Kirkus Reviews for its "informed viewpoints." More than half the book is on the USSR.

- Profile of Europe (1948)
- "Commencement addresses, Conduct of life," LIFE (1952)
