= The God of the Machine =

1943 book by Isabel Paterson

- First edition
- Author: Isabel Paterson
- Subject: Individualism
- Publisher: G. P. Putnam's Sons
- Publication date: 1943
- ISBN: 978-1412815833

The God of the Machine is a book written by Isabel Paterson and originally published in January 1943 in the United States by G. P. Putnam's Sons. At the time of its release, it was considered a cornerstone to the philosophy of individualism. Her biographer, Stephen D. Cox, in 2004 described Paterson as the "earliest progenitor of libertarianism as we know it today".

The book has been published several times: by G.P. Putnam's Sons in 1943, by Muriel Hall in 1964, by Transaction Publishers in 1993, and by Routledge in 2017.

== Background ==
Isabel Paterson wrote a regular column for the New York Herald Tribune, where she first articulated many of her beliefs, which reached their final form in The God of the Machine. She also foreshadowed those ideas, especially free trade, in her historical novels during the 1920s and 1930s.

Paterson opposed most parts of the economic program known as the New Deal that US president Franklin D. Roosevelt and the Congress put into effect during the 1930s and she advocated less governmental involvement in social and fiscal matters. She also led a group of younger friends (many of whom were other employees of the Herald Tribune) who shared her views. One member of that group was the young Ayn Rand.

Paterson and Rand promoted each other's books, and they conducted an extensive exchange of letters, touching on religion and philosophy. That correspondence ended with a personal quarrel in 1948. Rand, an atheist, was critical of the attempts of Paterson, a deist, to link capitalism with religion, things that Rand considered incompatible.
