= Raymond E. Murphy =

American government official

Raymond E. Murphy (1896 – July 28, 1963) was an American official in the United States Department of State, known for investigating foreign infiltration including Nazis and Communists, who first brought information about Whittaker Chambers to Richard Nixon (1947).

== Background ==
Raymond Edward Murphy was born in 1896 in Lewiston, Maine. He attended Bates College. He had a brother and sister, who remained in Lewiston.

== Career ==
On December 1, 1921, Murphy received appointment as a clerk in the State of Maine. Soon after, he took a clerk position at the United States Department of State, moved to Washington, DC, and attended Georgetown University's law school. In 1925, he joined the European Division under Robert Kelly. Duties included keeping tabs on the Comintern and news through communist sources like Inprecor. Allies at State included: Loy Henderson, Elbridge Durbrow, Charles E. Bohlen, and George Kennan. In 1935, Murphy transferred to the European Affairs Division, then led by Assistant Secretary of State James Clement Dunn. He debriefed more than one hundred communist defectors including Walter Krivitsky and Margarete Buber-Neumann. In 1940, Murphy was involved in the case of Joseph Hansen (1910–1979), was an American Trotskyist and leading figure in the Socialist Workers Party.

By the start of World War II, Murphy ran a "secretive EUR/X unit" as an "embryonic intelligence service" within the State Department. On June 2, 1945, he wrote a report that interpreted an April 1945 critique by French communist Jacques Duclos as an attack on Earl Browder's American Communist Party, signaling a return to earlier communist drive for world revolution. By June 1945, Murphy had become special assistant to the Director of European Affairs at the State Department (later ambassador) H. Freeman Matthews. According to historian Ted Morgan:

Ostensibly, there were two camps inside the State Department, one of which, led by Acheson and McCormack, wanted to build up a centralized intelligence unit. The other camp, led by the officers in charge of the geographical divisions, fought to maintain their existing intelligence capacities. But what was presented as a jurisdictional dispute had a strong security component.
[US Secretary of State] Byrnes had named, as his assistant secretary in charge of administration, his law partner and South Carolina crony, Donald Russell. With his direct line to Byrnes, Russell has precedence over Acheson. J. Anthony Panuch, an anti-Communist hard-liner, was Russell's assistant in charge of security. Panuch worked closely with Raymond E. Murphy, who ran a mysterious State Department Office called EUR/X, devoted to the study of worldwide Communist subversion. This Wizard of Oz-like character, known only to a handful inside State, performed such tasks as debriefing Soviet defectors.
Murphy warned Panuch that, prior to the demise of the wartime agencies, the Communist-controlled United Public Workers of America had only one member inside the State Department. After the transfer, the membership rose to between one hundred and two hundred. The chairman of the UPWA local, Peveril Meigs, advocated striking against the federal government. "This means that the Department now has a first-class headache," Murphy wrote Panuch, since Congress was placing riders on all appropriates bills, stating that no part of the funds could be used to pay the salaries of employees who sanction the right to strike against the federal government.

After hearing from a TIME magazine colleague on secondment to State (Samuel Gardner Welles), Murphy visited Whittaker Chambers twice at the Pipe Creek Farm, first on March 20, 1945, then on August 28, 1946. A report that Murphy filed thereafter contributed to the decision by Alger Hiss to leave State. As World War II ended, Murphy worked with former CPUSA leader Jay Lovestone to counter Soviet-communist support for trade unions in post-war Europe; at one point after 1945, he even had Lovestone's lover (Louise Page Morris) working for him, e.g., to penetrate the Congress of American Women. Formation of the Central Intelligence Agency (CIA) in the late 1940s led to intelligence work in US embassies either transferring to CIA roles or otherwise ending. In addition, Dean Acheson, by then at State, did not like Murphy for helping expose Acheson's friend Alger Hiss as a spy. By 1951, Murphy had both come under attack internally and had lost his diplomatic intelligence network. In 1959, Murphy retired from State after more than three decades of service.

== Personal life and death ==
Murphy married Agnes Mullen; they had a stepdaughter Rosanne Burch.

Murphy was a member of the bar associations of the State of Maine and Washington, DC.

Raymond E. Murphy died age 64 on July 28, 1963, in Washington, DC.

== Awards ==
- 1958: Distinguished Service Award of the United States Department of State
- 1959: Officer of the order of Merit of the Italian Republic

== Works ==
In 1942, Murphy partook in preparation of a "White Book" analyzing Nazism, along with colleagues Francis Z. Stevens, Howard Trivers, and Joseph M. Roland, and published as National Socialism: Basic Principles.

- National Socialism: Basic Principles (1942)
- "Possible Resurrection of Communist International, Resumption of Extreme Leftist Activities, Possible Effect on United States," Foreign Relations of the United States: The Conference of Berlin (The Potsdam Conference) (1945)

== See also ==
- Joseph Hansen (socialist)
