= English Grammar in Use =

English language reference and practice book

- Author: Raymond Murphy
- Language: English
- Series: In Use
- Subject: Self-study book on English Grammar
- Published: 1985 (1st Ed), Cambridge University Press and 2019 Jan (5th Ed)
- Publication place: UK
- Media type: Paper Book, or eBook
- ISBN: 978-1-108-45765-1 (5th Ed)

English Grammar in Use is a self-study reference and practice book for intermediate to advanced students of English. The book was written by Raymond Murphy and published by Cambridge University Press.

== Book editions ==
Book cover of the second edition

The first edition of the book was released in 1985. This release contained 378 pages and had an ISBN of 9780521287234. Since then, the book has gone through a number of reprints. In 2019, the 5th version of the book has been released.

== About the book ==
Preview of unit 2 showing lesson and exercises

The book is used by English language students, especially those from non-English-speaking countries, as a practice and reference book. Though the book was titled as a self-study reference, the publisher states that the book is also suitable for reinforcement work in the classroom.

There are three editions of the book (with answer key or without answer key or with answer key, eBook and audio). The book is divided into units, each unit (typically of two facing pages) has the lesson itself on the left page, while the right page contains exercises on that lesson. There are 145 units in the book. These units are ordered according to the lesson simplicity, or starts with the basic topics and goes up to more advanced topics.

The author advises readers to flip over and find whichever topics they feel they need improvement on. A study guide is placed at the end of the book, which contains exercises that when solved reveal what topics student needs improvement on, and suggests the unit numbers the student should study; and thus the reader can figure out which units to study and which to omit.

== See also ==
- History of English grammars
