= Llewellyn Jones (writer) =

American writer and literary editor

Llewellyn Jones (13 July 1884–1 July 1961) was a United States writer and literary editor. He was one of the signatories to Humanist Manifesto I.

Jones was literary editor of the Chicago Evening Post from 1914 to 1932 and then worked as an editor for Willett, Clark, and Company. He moved to Boston in 1937, when he became president of the Greater Boston American–Scandinavian Forum.

== Works ==
- First Impressions; Essays on Poetry, Criticism, and Prosody (1925)
- How to Criticize Books (1928)
- How to Read Books (1930)
