= Atlas Shrugged (film series) =

Trilogy of American science fiction drama films

- Directed by: Paul Johansson (Part I); John Putch (Part II); J. James Manera (Part III)
- Screenplay by: John Aglialoro; Brian Patrick O'Toole (Part I); Duke Sandefur; Duncan Scott (Part II); John Aglialoro; Harmon Kaslow; J. James Manera (Part III)
- Based on: Atlas Shrugged by Ayn Rand
- Produced by: John Aglialoro; Harmon Kaslow
- Cinematography: Ross Berryman (Parts I/II); Gale Tattersall (Part III)
- Edited by: Jim Flynn; Sherril Schlesinger (Part I); John Gilbert (Part II); Tony Ciccone (Part III)
- Music by: Elia Cmiral (Parts I/III); Chris Bacon (Part II)
- Production company: The Strike Productions (Part I)
- Distributed by: Rocky Mountain Pictures (Part I); Atlas Distribution Company (Part II/III)
- Release dates: April 15, 2011 (Part I); October 12, 2012 (Part II); September 12, 2014 (Part III)
- Running time: 308 minutes
- Country: United States
- Language: English
- Budget: $35 million
- Box office: $8.9 million

Atlas Shrugged is a trilogy of American science fiction drama films. The series, adaptations of Ayn Rand's 1957 novel of the same title, are subtitled Part I (2011), Part II (2012) and Part III (2014); the last sometimes includes Who Is John Galt? in the title. The series as a whole received highly negative reviews and was a box-office bomb.

== Synopsis ==
The films take place in a dystopian United States, wherein many of society's most prominent and successful industrialists abandon their fortunes as the government shifts the nation towards socialism, making aggressive new regulations, taking control of industries, while picking winners and losers.

- In Part I, railroad executive Dagny Taggart (Taylor Schilling) and steel mogul Henry Rearden (Grant Bowler) form an alliance to fight the increasingly authoritarian government of the United States.
- In Part II, Taggart (Samantha Mathis) and Rearden (Jason Beghe) search desperately for the inventor of a revolutionary motor as the U.S. government continues to spread its control over the national economy.
- In Part III, Taggart (Laura Regan) and Rearden (Rob Morrow) come into contact with the man responsible for the strike whose effects are the focus of much of the series.

== Overview ==
Role	Films		
Role	Atlas Shrugged: Part I (2011)	Atlas Shrugged: Part II (2012)	Atlas Shrugged: Part III (2014)
Director	Paul Johansson	John Putch	J. James Manera
Producer(s)	John Aglialoro; Harmon Kaslow	John Aglialoro; Harmon Kaslow; Jeff Freilich	John Aglialoro; Harmon Kaslow
Screenwriter(s)	John Aglialoro; Brian Patrick O'Toole	Duke Sandefur; Brian Patrick O'Toole; Duncan Scott	J. James Manera; John Aglialoro; Harmon Kaslow
Composer(s)	Elia Cmiral	Chris Bacon; Ash Brown; Gregg Benedict	Elia Cmiral
Editor(s)	Jim Flynn; Sherril Schlesinger	John Gilbert	Tony Ciccone
Cinematographer	Ross Berryman	Ross Berryman	Gale Tattersall
Production company(s)	The Strike Productions	Either Or Productions	"A is A" Productions, Inc.
Distributor(s)	Rocky Mountain Pictures; 20th Century Fox	Atlas Distribution Company	Atlas Distribution Company
Runtime	97 minutes	112 minutes	99 minutes
Release date	April 15, 2011	October 12, 2012	September 12, 2014

== Production ==
See Part I's production, Part II's production, Part III's production

== Plot ==
See Part I's plot, Part II's plot, Part III's plot

== Cast ==
The film trilogy is unusual in that none of the same actors reprised their roles in the next films.

Character(s)	Actor		
Character(s)	Part I (2011)	Part II (2012)	Part III (2014)
Dagny Taggart	Taylor Schilling	Samantha Mathis	Laura Regan
Henry "Hank" Rearden	Grant Bowler	Jason Beghe	Rob Morrow
James Taggart	Matthew Marsden	Patrick Fabian	Greg Germann
John Galt	Paul Johansson	D.B. Sweeney	Kristoffer Polaha
Ellis Wyatt	Graham Beckel	Graham Beckel (image only)	Lew Temple
Francisco Domingo Carlos Andres Sebastián d'Anconia	Jsu Garcia	Esai Morales	Joaquim de Almeida
Wesley Mouch	Michael Lerner	Paul McCrane	Louis Herthum
Edwin "Eddie" Willers	Edi Gathegi	Richard T. Jones	Dominic Daniel
Cherryl Taggart (née Brooks)	Mercedes Connor	Larisa Oleynik	Jen Nikolaisen
Lillian Rearden	Rebecca Wisocky	Kim Rhodes	
Philip Rearden	Neill Barry		
Owen Kellogg	Ethan Cohn		
Eugene Lawson	Rob Brownstein	Phil Valentine	
Midas Mulligan	Geoff Pierson		Mark Moses
Dr. Robert Stadler	Navid Negahban	Robert Picardo	Neil Dickson
Orren Boyle	Jon Polito		
Head of State Thompson		Ray Wise	Peter Mackenzie
Hugh Akston	Michael O'Keefe		Stephen Tobolowsky
Dr. Floyd Ferris		John Rubinstein	Larry Cedar

== Reception ==
The trilogy received predominantly negative critic reviews. Further, the aggregate earnings in the USA box office is just under $9 million, with each film performing worse than the last on both accounts.

- The first film, directed by Paul Johansson, stars Taylor Schilling, Grant Bowler, Matthew Marsden, Johansson, Graham Beckel and Jsu Garcia, and was released in April 2011; it had a USA box office of $4.6 million on a budget of $20 million. Most of the marketing was done online.
- The second film, directed by John Putch, stars Samantha Mathis, Jason Beghe, Patrick Fabian, D.B. Sweeney and Esai Morales; it had a USA box office of $3.3 million on a budget of $10 million.
- The third film, directed by J. James Manera, stars Laura Regan, Rob Morrow, Greg Germann, Kristoffer Polaha, Lew Temple and Joaquim de Almeida; it had a USA box office of $0.8 million on a budget of under $5 million.

Film	Release date	Rotten Tomatoes	Metacritic	Budget	Gross
Atlas Shrugged: Part I	April 15, 2011	12% (50 reviews)	28 (19 reviews)	$20 million	$4,627,375
Atlas Shrugged: Part II	October 12, 2012	5% (22 reviews)	26 (11 reviews)	$10 million	$3,336,053
Atlas Shrugged: Part III	September 26, 2014	0% (10 reviews)	9 (7 reviews)	>$5 million	$846,704

== Home media ==
Part I was released on DVD and Blu-ray on November 8, 2011; Part II on February 19, 2013; and Part III on January 6, 2015.
