= John Galt (disambiguation) =

John Galt is a fictional character in the 1957 book Atlas Shrugged by Ayn Rand.

John Galt may also refer to:

- John Galt (novelist) (1779–1839), Scottish writer, entrepreneur, political commentator and historical founder of Guelph, Ontario

== See also ==
- John Galt Corporation, American demolition and construction contractor
- John Galt Solutions, Inc., American software company
- The John A. Galt telescope at the Dominion Radio Astrophysical Observatory
- John Gault, American inventor
