= Atlas Shrugged: Part II =

2012 film by John Putch

- Theatrical release poster
- Directed by: John Putch
- Screenplay by: Duke Sandefur; Brian Patrick O'Toole; Duncan Scott
- Based on: Atlas Shrugged by Ayn Rand
- Produced by: Harmon Kaslow; John Aglialoro; Jeff Freilich
- Starring: Samantha Mathis; Jason Beghe; Esai Morales; Patrick Fabian; Kim Rhodes; Richard T. Jones; D.B. Sweeney
- Cinematography: Ross Berryman
- Edited by: John Gilbert
- Music by: Chris Bacon
- Production companies: Harmon Kaslow & John Aglialoro Productions; Spotlight Pictures; Either-Or Productions
- Distributed by: Atlas Distribution Company; Either-Or Productions
- Release date: October 12, 2012
- Running time: 112 minutes
- Country: United States
- Language: English
- Budget: $10 million
- Box office: $3,336,053

Atlas Shrugged: Part II (or Atlas Shrugged II: The Strike) is a 2012 American science fiction drama film serving as the second installment in a trilogy adapting Ayn Rand's 1957 novel Atlas Shrugged. Although it continues directly after Atlas Shrugged: Part I (2011), it features an entirely different cast. Directed by John Putch, the film stars Samantha Mathis, Jason Beghe, Esai Morales, Patrick Fabian, Kim Rhodes, Richard T. Jones, and D. B. Sweeney.

Atlas Shrugged: Part II was released on October 12, 2012. The film was largely panned by critics and was a box office bomb, grossing only $3.3 million worldwide against a $10 million budget. Despite Part II being a critical and financial failure, the final installment in the trilogy, Part III: Who Is John Galt?, was released in 2014, also featuring an entirely different cast.

== Plot ==
Dagny Taggart pilots an airplane in pursuit of another plane. Dagny asks herself, "Who is John Galt?" before apparently crashing into a mountainside.

Nine months earlier, Dagny is trying to understand the abandoned prototype of an advanced motor she and her lover Hank Rearden have found. Scientists across the country have been disappearing under mysterious circumstances, but Dagny is able to locate Quentin Daniels, who agrees to help from an abandoned laboratory in Utah.

Dagny's brother James Taggart, president of the family railroad company, meets store clerk Cherryl Brooks and brings her to see a renowned pianist, who disappears during his performance, leaving a note asking, "Who is John Galt?" Later, at James and Cherryl's wedding, Dagny's friend Francisco d'Anconia argues with other guests about whether money is evil, and secretly informs Rearden about devastating explosions at his copper mine—the next day. Rearden spends the night with Dagny. Later, he is confronted about the affair by his wife Lillian, but when he offers a divorce she declines, in order to maintain her position in society.

Rearden sells his advanced Rearden Metal to Ken Danagger's coal mining company, but refuses to sell it to the federal government, in defiance of the newly enacted "Fair Share" law that forces businesses to sell to all buyers. The two are charged under the law. Dagny barges into Danagger's office, realizes that he too is about to disappear, and understands that she is close to understanding the force behind the disappearances. At trial, Rearden defends individual freedom and the pursuit of profit, and is given only a token penalty by the court, which fears turning him into a martyr. The government announces "Directive 10-289", which freezes employment and production and requires that all patents be gifted to the government. Rearden defies this decree as well, but relents when he is blackmailed with photos of himself and Dagny that would damage Dagny's reputation.

When Dagny hears about Rearden's "gift" and her brother's complicity, she quits the railroad. During her absence, a Taggart Transcontinental train collides with a military train in a tunnel, due largely to political pressure by a passenger and human error by Dagny's poorly trained replacement. This impels Dagny back to her job. D'Anconia tries to dissuade her from returning, as he had earlier tried to talk Rearden into leaving his business, but she returns anyway.

Dagny takes a train to Colorado to show her faith in the railway, but its engine fails. The repair technician used to work for 20th Century Motor Company, which produced the motor Dagny found. He tells Dagny how the need-based reward system in his company failed, and his coworker John Galt left the company vowing to "stop the motor of the world". Dagny calls Daniels, who tells her that he is quitting. Dagny buys a small airplane and flies to Utah to try to dissuade him, but as she is landing, she sees him get into a plane on the airstrip.

After a pursuit in the air—the opening scene of the film—Dagny's plane crashes in a valley hidden by stealth technology. A wounded Dagny Taggart crawls to the edge of her crashed plane, where she is greeted by John Galt.

The film ends with a quote from Ayn Rand:

"Money is the barometer of a society's virtue.

But when you see that in order to produce it, you need to obtain permission from those who produce nothing...

You will know that your society is doomed.

== Cast ==
- Samantha Mathis as Dagny Taggart
- Jason Beghe as Henry Rearden
- Esai Morales as Francisco d'Anconia
- Patrick Fabian as James Taggart
- Kim Rhodes as Lillian Rearden
- Richard T. Jones as Eddie Willers
- D.B. Sweeney as John Galt
- Paul McCrane as Wesley Mouch
- John Rubinstein as Dr. Floyd Ferris
- Robert Picardo as Dr. Robert Stadler
- Ray Wise as Head of State Thompson
- Diedrich Bader as Quentin Daniels
- Bug Hall as Leonard Small
- Arye Gross as Ken Danagger
- Michael Gross as Ted 'Buzz' Killman
- Rex Linn as Kip Chalmers
- Larisa Oleynik as Cherryl Brooks
- Thomas F. Wilson as Robert Collins
- Teller as Laughlin
- Sean Hannity as himself
- Juan Williams as himself
- Bob Beckel as himself
- Tamara Holder as herself

== Production ==
The producers intended to finance Part II using profits from Atlas Shrugged: Part I. When that film failed to generate a profit, a private debt sale in early 2012 raised $16 million of the $25 million the producers sought, enabling a budget larger than that of the first film. There is some confusion about the relative size of the budget for the first two movies. The part 2 production budget was around $10 million and the marketing budget around $10 million, between 2010 and 2012. During the first movie a total of less than $20 million were spent over the course of the preceding 18 years. Hence, more was spent directly on producing the 2nd film. The production company announced that Part 2 would be released to coincide with the U.S. general election season in fall 2012.

Duncan Scott, who in 1986 was responsible for creating a new, re-edited version of the 1942 Italian film adaptation of Ayn Rand's novel We the Living with English subtitles, joined the production team.

The name of the production company for the second film, Either Or Productions, LLC, is taken from the title Rand gave to the middle section of her novel. An April press release stated the name of the film as Atlas Shrugged, Part 2: Either Or.

Principal photography began on April 2, 2012 with an all-new cast, including Samantha Mathis as the heroine Dagny Taggart, Jason Beghe as the industrialist Henry Rearden, and Esai Morales as the playboy Francisco d'Anconia. Producer John Aglialoro has implied that hiring the cast of Part I for the sequel exceeded the movie's budget, saying "it's hard to lock people down", and also noting that Taylor Schilling, the actress who played Dagny in Part I, is "a bona fide movie star now". According to a report before the film was released, the film was to be on a 31-day shooting schedule, four days more than that of the first movie, and to undergo two months of post-production. According to the credits, the movie was done with the permission but not participation with the Rand estate.

== Release ==
=== Pre-release ===
Atlas Shrugged: Part II was not screened for critics before its release, with producer John Aglialoro questioning "the integrity of the critics". The film was screened for the conservative think-tank The Heritage Foundation and the libertarian Cato Institute.

=== Box office ===
Atlas Shrugged: Part II opened on 1,012 screens and earned $692,000 on its premiere and $1.7 million its opening weekend, debuting at #11. Despite opening on more than three times the screens of Part I, it did not significantly improve on Part I's opening weekend.

The box office take totaled $3,286,255 through November 4, 2012, the last date for which the producers released numbers. When adjusted for inflation, the film had one of the two hundred least profitable wide openings of the past thirty years, followed by one of the two hundred largest week-over-week drops recorded for the same period. By the third week of release it was down to under 150 screens, taking in under $100,000 on its third weekend.

== Reception ==
Review aggregation website Rotten Tomatoes gives the film a score of 4% based on reviews from 23 professional critics, with an average score of 3/10, and the site's consensus is: "Poorly written, clumsily filmed and edited, and hampered by amateurish acting, Atlas Shrugged: Part II does no favors to the ideology it so fervently champions." Metacritic, which assigns a weighted average score out of 100 to reviews from mainstream critics, gives the film a score of 26 based on 11 reviews, which is interpreted as "generally unfavorable" by Metacritic.

Film critics were not impressed with the film based on several reviews: reviewer Danny Baldwin gave the film a "D" rating. Scott Tobias of The A.V. Club gave the film a grade of "F", citing lack of story progression and poor character designs, and named it the second-worst film of 2012, claiming: "The irony of Part II's mere existence is rich enough: The free market is a religion for Rand acolytes, and it emphatically rejected Part I." Jim Lane of the Sacramento News & Review gave it a mixed review, calling it "a respectable effort hampered less by its limited budget than by the dogmatic contrivances of Rand's plot and the straw-man polemics of her wooden, declamatory dialogue".

Economics columnist John Tamny of Forbes.com gave the film a positive review and argued that it is "a must see because it in a very handsome way describes the world in which we live today whereby the achievers are being shackled by the moochers".

The film was nominated for two Golden Raspberry Awards including Worst Director for John Putch and Worst Screenplay.

=== Sequel ===
The sequel and the third part in the trilogy, Atlas Shrugged Part III: Who Is John Galt?, was released on September 12, 2014.
