= Harmon Kaslow =

American film producer

Harmon M. Kaslow
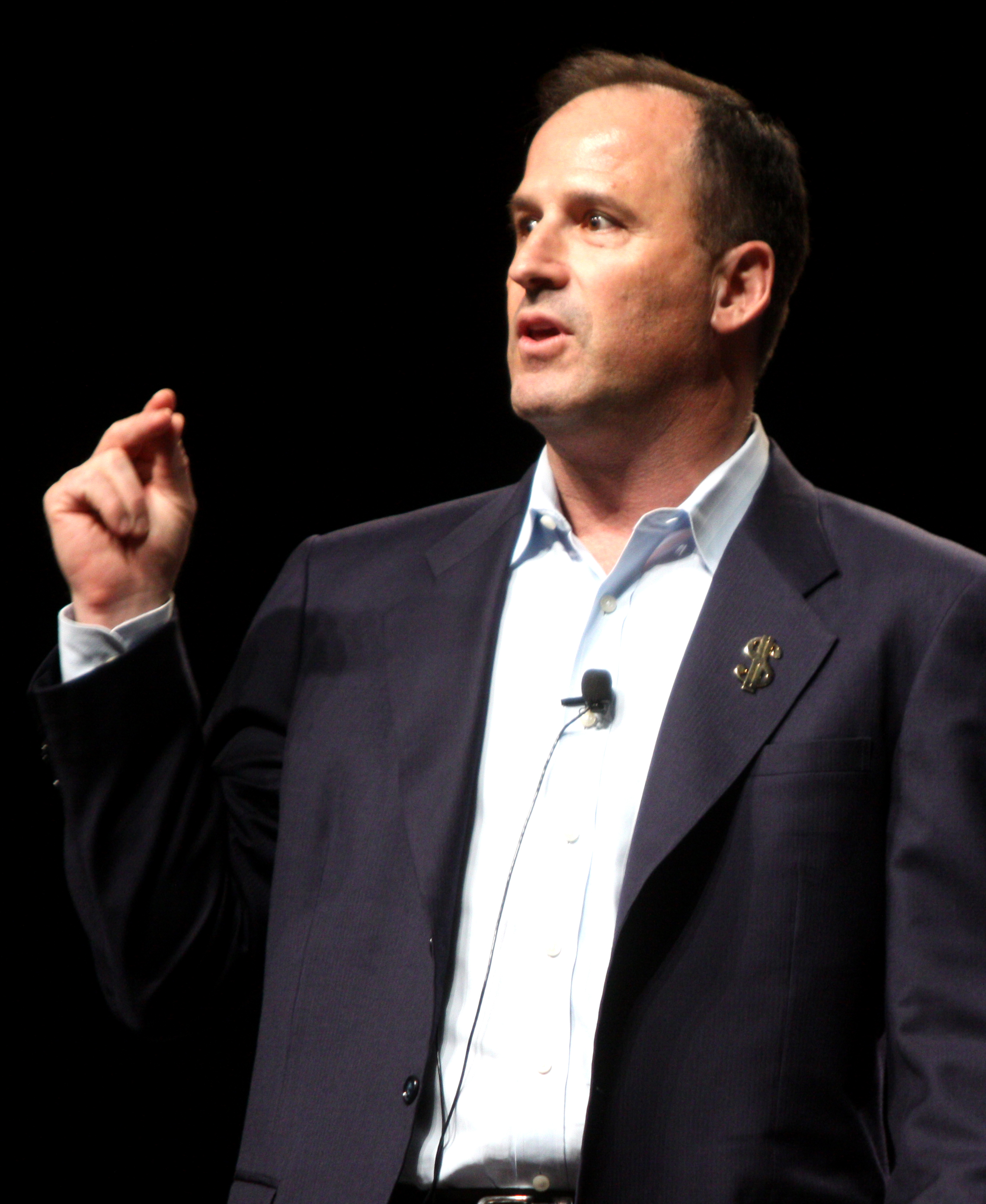
- Kaslow in 2012
- Born: Hollywood, CA
- Education: University of California, Davis, University of Southern California
- Occupations: General Counsel; Business and Legal Affairs; Motion Picture Producer

Harmon Kaslow is a licensed attorney (California and Federal Courts) and motion picture producer. Along with John Aglialoro, Kaslow produced a trilogy of movies based on the Ayn Rand novel titled "Atlas Shrugged" including Atlas Shrugged: Part I and Atlas Shrugged: Part II and Atlas Shrugged: Part III (aka Atlas Shrugged: Who is John Galt?). Prior to producing the Atlas Shrugged movies, Kaslow was an executive at A-Mark Entertainment, Kismet Entertainment Group and an associate at Shea & Gould, an international law firm.

Kaslow is an experienced finance / corporate / entertainment lawyer. He has provided production, distribution and finance legal counsel and has been an "executive producer" on more than 16 motion pictures including the cult-classic Dog Soldiers, but Atlas Shrugged: Part I was the first time he received credit as a "Producer" (along with Aglialoro) on a motion picture. As a result of a Writers Guild of America Arbitration over the writing credits, Kaslow, along with J. James Manera & John Aglialoro, received a "screenplay by" credit on Atlas Shrugged III: Who is John Galt?

In a 2011 interview promoting the motion picture "Atlas Shrugged - Part I", Kaslow stated the following: "I believe in limited government, I believe in individual liberty, and I think that those are very similar to the same core values that the party espouses for its members."

In 2013, Kaslow was part of a Kickstarter campaign that was launched to promote and market Atlas Shrugged: Who is John Galt?, and the Kickstarter campaign was successful in that it raised more than $445,000 which was nearly $200,000 more than the campaign's goal.

An unfinished edit of Atlas Shrugged: Who is John Galt? premiered at the Anthem Film Festival and was awarded 2014 Best Narrative Film. The movie was released theatrically on September 12, 2014. The Atlas Shrugged trilogy was not well received by the critics and earned only $9 million at the U.S. box office.

In 2015, Kaslow made an announcement regarding CinemaCloudWorks, which was hailed as a revolutionary technology for planning, booking, settling and marketing theatrical motion pictures.

In 2017, Atlas Distribution Company, under Kaslow's leadership, distributed six motion pictures including the BBC's "Earth: One Amazing Day" which was nominated for a PGA Award; the award-winning "No Greater Love" which credits Kaslow as a producer and has a 100% score on Rotten Tomatoes; and the hit family / faith-based film titled "Let There Be Light." Kaslow was also on "The TV/Film/Video - Platforms and Partnerships - Developing Hollywood Content as Brand and Distribution Package" panel at the Digital Hollywood symposium sponsored in part by The Hollywood Reporter and a subject of an article in connection with the American Film Market.

In 2018, Kaslow made an announcement that CinemaCloudWorks had commenced an association with Digital Cinema United. In November 2017, an article appeared in Forbes.com regarding CinemaCloudWorks' application called iScreeningRoom.

== Personal life ==
Kaslow attended high school in Santa Ynez, California. In 1979, the year he graduated, he was also elected the State President of the California Future Farmers of America (FFA) and was part of a contingent of FFA Leaders who met with President Carter. Kaslow received a BS in Agricultural and Managerial Economics at the University of California, Davis and a Juris Doctor degree from the University of Southern California.
