= Graham Beckel =

American actor (born 1949)

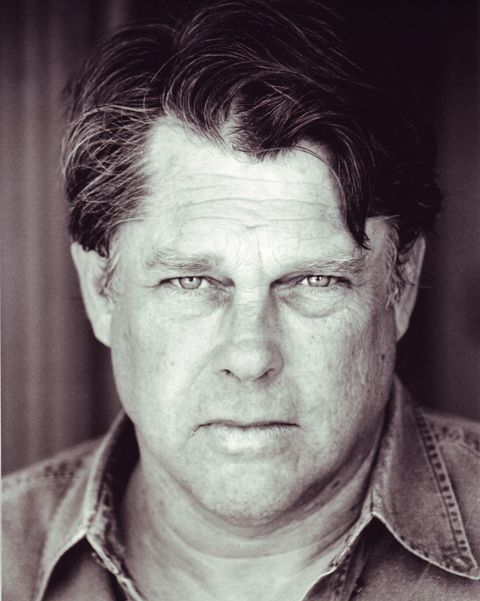
- Born: Graham Stuart Beckel; December 22, 1949 (age 76); New York City, U.S.
- Occupation: Actor
- Years active: 1973–present
- Spouse: Elizabeth Briggs Bailey (m. 1984)
- Relatives: Bob Beckel (brother)

Graham Stuart Beckel (born December 22, 1949) is an American character actor, known for his roles in films and guest appearances on television.

== Early life and education ==
Beckel graduated from the American Academy of Dramatic Arts in New York. He graduated from Moses Brown School in 1968.Better known as Buddy he was a member of the football team.

== Career ==
In film, Beckel is known for his roles as Ford in the drama The Paper Chase, and Detective Richard Stensland in Curtis Hanson's L.A. Confidential. Beckel also appeared in The Astronaut Farmer as Frank, a customer at the diner. Beckel portrayed oil tycoon Ellis Wyatt in Atlas Shrugged (2011).

On television, he played Jack Fisk on Battlestar Galactica and Hal Sanders on Heroes. He has a recurring role on the AMC TV show Halt & Catch Fire as Nathan Cardiff, owner of the show's fictional company Cardiff Electric. His guest appearances include Kojak, The Equalizer, The Practice, Longmire, Grey's Anatomy, Hawaii Five-0, NCIS, and Criminal Minds.

== Personal life ==
Beckel is the younger brother of the late political strategist and TV commentator Bob Beckel.

In 1984, he married Elizabeth Briggs Bailey, whose grandfather was Robert Fiske Bradford, Governor of Massachusetts.

== Filmography ==
=== Film ===
Graham Beckel film credits
Year	Title	Role
1973	The Paper Chase	Ford
1973	Happy as the Grass Was Green a.k.a. Hazel's People	Eric Mills
1976	The Money (Atlanta City Jackpot)	Roland
1984	C.H.U.D	Val
1989	True Believer	Sklaroff
1989	Lost Angels	Richard Doolan
1990	Welcome Home, Roxy Carmichael	Les Bossetti
1991	Liebestraum	Sheriff
1992	Jennifer 8	Sergeant John "J.K." Taylor
1993	Barbarians at the Gate	Don Kelly
1995	Leaving Las Vegas	L.A. Bartender
1997	L.A. Confidential	Detective Richard "Dick Stens" Stensland
1998	Black Dog	Frank Cutler
1998	Bulworth	Man With Dark Glasses
1998	Fallen	John Reynolds
1999	Blue Streak	Lieutenant Rizzo
1999	No Vacancy	Actor
1999	True Crime	Arnold McCardle
2001	Pearl Harbor	Chester W. Nimitz
2001	Hardball	Duffy
2002	Dark Blue	Detective Peltz
2003	Two Days	Mr. Miller
2003	Northfork	Marvin
2005	Man of God	Actor
2005	Brokeback Mountain	L.D. Newsome
2006	Bachelor Party Vegas	Officer Stone
2007	The Astronaut Farmer	Frank
2010	Peacock	Conor Black
2010	The Grind	Michael Murphy Sr.
2011	Atlas Shrugged: Part I	Ellis Wyatt
2012	Disappearing Bakersfield	Mr. Smooth
2013	Escape Plan	Brims
2013	Wish You Well	Thurston Goode
2014	Miss Meadows	Tony Weaver
2014	The Loft	Hiram Fry
2014	Dragon Nest: Warriors' Dawn	Varnak (voice)
2016	Nocturnal Animals	Lieutenant Graves
2016	Rules Don't Apply	Wilbur
2017	Just Getting Started	Burt
2018	Sicario: Day of the Soldado	Dale Hammonds
2023	Eat Your Heart Out	Narrator

=== Television ===
Graham Beckel television credits
Year	Title	Role	Notes
1977	Kojak	Lane	Episode: "Another Gypsy Queen"
1985	The Execution of Raymond Graham	Vic Graham	TV Movie
1987	The Equalizer	George Hershey	Episode: "Re-Entry"
1990	Rising Son	Billy	TV Movie
1993	Partners	Terry Bidwell	TV movie
1998	The Practice	Joel Helms	2 episodes
2001	Just Ask My Children	Denver Dunn	TV movie
2005–2006	Battlestar Galactica	Jack Fisk	4 episodes
2006	Heroes	Hal Sanders	1 episode
2007	Battlestar Galactica: Razor	Colonel Jack Fisk	TV movie
2010	CSI: NY	Telly Gines	1 episode
2012	Longmire	Dan	Episode: "The Worst Kind of Hunter"
2014	Halt and Catch Fire	Nathan Cardiff	7 episodes
2017–2020	When the Streetlights Go On	Detective Hoffman	
2019	Hawaii Five-0	Roger Barton	1 episode
2020	Criminal Minds	Delvin Weaver	Episode: "Face Off"
