= Basement Jack =

- Teaser poster
- Directed by: Michael Shelton
- Written by: Brian Patrick O'Toole
- Produced by: Eric Peter-Kaiser; Brian Patrick O'Toole
- Starring: Tiffany Shepis; Billy Morrison; Lynn Lowry
- Cinematography: Mathew Rudenberg
- Edited by: Michael Shelton
- Music by: Alan Howarth
- Production companies: Black Gate Entertainment; Island Gateway Films
- Distributed by: Black Gate Entertainment
- Release date: November 17, 2009
- Running time: 93 minutes
- Country: United States
- Language: English

Basement Jack is a 2009 American slasher horror film, which was written by Brian Patrick O'Toole and directed by Michael Shelton, it stars Billy Morrison, Tiffany Shepis and Lynn Lowry.

== Synopsis ==
A few years ago Jack Riley finally snapped and killed his abusive mother. After killing his mother, he went from house to house, killing entire families and arranging their bodies in poses that would suggest a happy home life. Jack was just a teenager, when all of this happened so of course he didn’t go to jail, but he just got out of his institution and he’s out to finish what he started while a vengeful woman wants to make him pay.

== Cast ==
- Eric Peter Kaiser as Jack Riley aka Basement Jack
- Michele Morrow as Karen Cook
- Sam Skoryna as Officer Chris Watts
- Lynn Lowry as Mrs. Riley
- Tiffany Shepis as Officer Armando
- Billy Morrison as Detective Beck
- Joel Brooks as Officer Wytynek
- Nathan Bexton as the Manager
- Monica Alvarez as Neighbor
- Julianne Bianchi as Mrs. Cook
- Aaron Borghello as Police Officer 2 (as Aaron Borghel)
- Michael Patrick Breen as Mr. O'Donnell
- Dakota Carter as Mark Caffola
- Mark Elias as Ryan
- Silvio Fama as Mr. Cook
- M. Steven Felty as Sgt. Pignataro
- Joshua Lou Friedman as Detective Barmack
- Noel Gugliemi as Detective Anderson
- Kim Knight as Tracy Caffola
- Miriam Korn
- Kyle Loethen as Rick Green
- Les Mahoney as Detective
- Billy Morrison as Detective Beck
- Nic Nac as Ted The Delivery Man
- Amanda Normington as Pam Wytynek
- Teri Pluma as Mrs. O'Donnell
- Kelly Ryan as Margie Caffola
- Kyle Sanders as Young Jack
- Jack Sanderson as Robert Caffola
- Matt Santoro as Detective Mathieson
- John Skoryna as Karl
- Ben Tolpin as Newscaster Don Drury
- Anna-Marie Wayne as Laverne
- James Williams as Nick Cook

== Production ==
The film's lead protagonist is played by American actress Michele Morrow and the titular villain is played by Eric-Peter Kaiser. Well known Scream Queens Lynn Lowry and Tiffany Shepis make major appearances in the movie as well.

== Release ==
The film was released on November 17, 2009, but the original direct to DVD release was set on October 20, 2009.
