= Taylor Schilling =

American actress (born 1984)

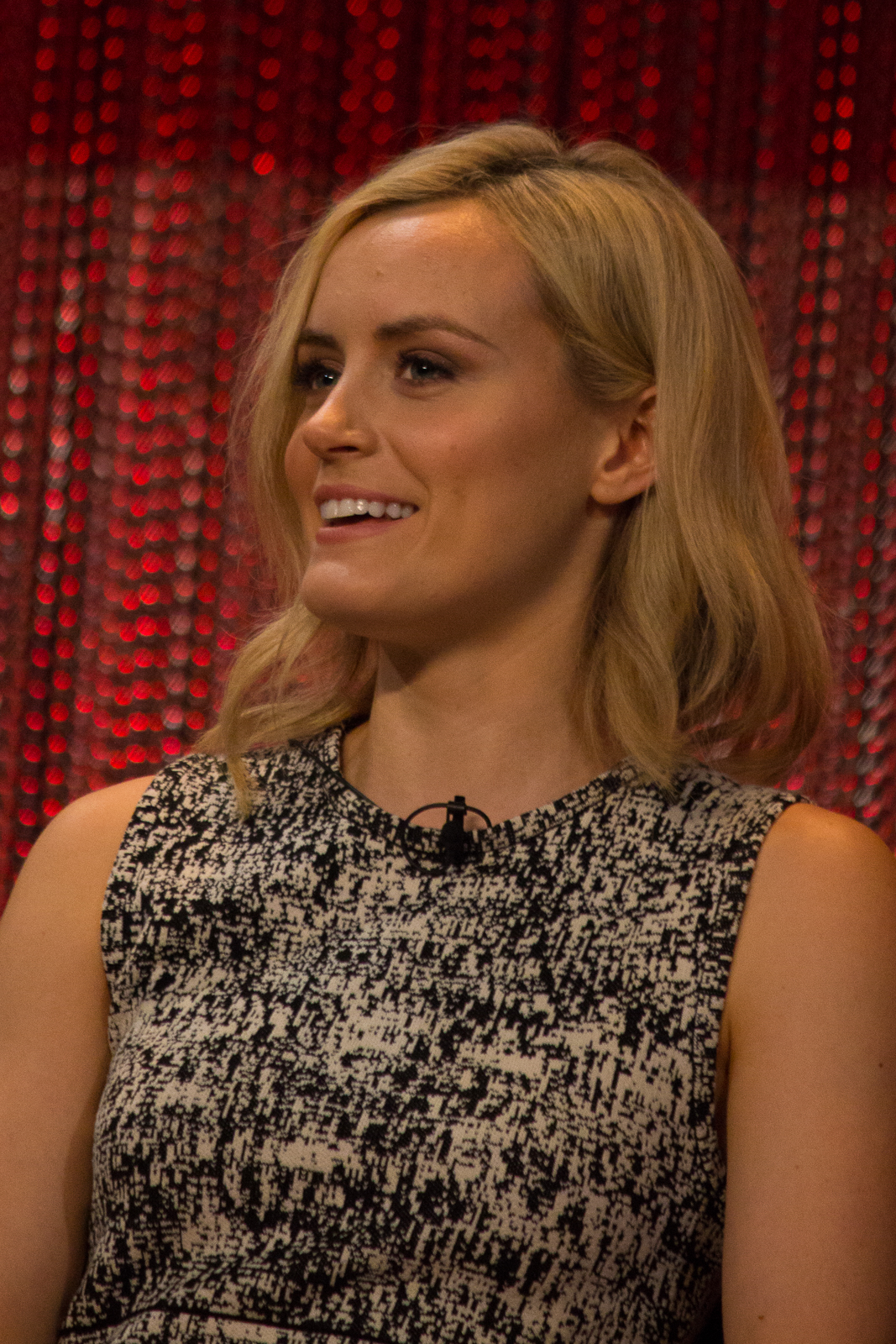
- Schilling in 2014
- Born: July 27, 1984 (age 42)
- Education: Fordham University (BA)
- Occupation: Actress
- Years active: 2007–present

Taylor Schilling (born July 27, 1984) is an American actress. She is best known for her role as Piper Chapman on the Netflix original comedy-drama series Orange Is the New Black (2013–2019), for which she received a nomination for the Primetime Emmy Award for Outstanding Lead Actress in a Comedy Series and two Golden Globe Award nominations for Best Actress – Television Series Musical or Comedy and Best Actress – Television Series Drama. She made her film debut in the 2007 drama Dark Matter. She also starred as Nurse Veronica Flanagan Callahan in the short-lived NBC medical drama Mercy (2009–2010). Her other films include Atlas Shrugged: Part I (2011), the romantic drama The Lucky One (2012), the comedy Take Me (2017), and the science-fiction thriller The Titan (2018).

== Early life and ==
Schilling was born July 27, 1984, the daughter of Patricia (née Miller), an MIT administrator, and Robert Schilling, a former prosecutor. She grew up in West Roxbury and Wayland, dividing her time between her divorced parents. A fan of the NBC medical drama ER in her youth, she began acting at a young age. She became active in her middle school's theatre program when she appeared in their production of Fiddler on the Roof.

After graduating from Wayland High School in 2002, Schilling attended Fordham University's campus at Lincoln Center, where she continued to take part in stage productions while earning her Bachelor of Fine Arts in 2006. She entered the graduate acting program at New York University's Tisch School of the Arts to continue her acting studies, but left after her second year. While attempting to break into acting, she supported herself by working as a nanny for a Manhattan-based family.

== Career ==
=== 2007–2012: Early work ===
Schilling won the Emerson College Playwright's Festival Outstanding Performance Award. She made her feature-film debut with a supporting role in the independent film Dark Matter (2007). In 2009, she starred in the NBC medical drama series Mercy as a former military nurse returning home after a tour in Iraq. When she read for the part via videotape from New York City, she impressed the show's creator and executive producer, Liz Heldens, who flew her to Los Angeles to audition. Mercy ran for one season, from September 2009 to May 2010.

The following year, Schilling portrayed the leading role of Dagny Taggart in the political science fiction drama film, Atlas Shrugged: Part I, an adaptation of part of the philosopher Ayn Rand's 1957 novel of the same name, the film is the first in a trilogy encompassing the entire book. The film received negative reviews from critics.

In 2012, Schilling starred alongside Zac Efron in the romantic drama film The Lucky One, based on Nicholas Sparks' 2008 novel of the same name. The movie received negative reviews but grossed over $99.4 million worldwide. At the 2012 Teen Choice Awards, Schilling received nomination for Choice Movie Actress: Romance. In 2012, she had a supporting role in Argo, directed by Ben Affleck, but most of her scenes were cut.

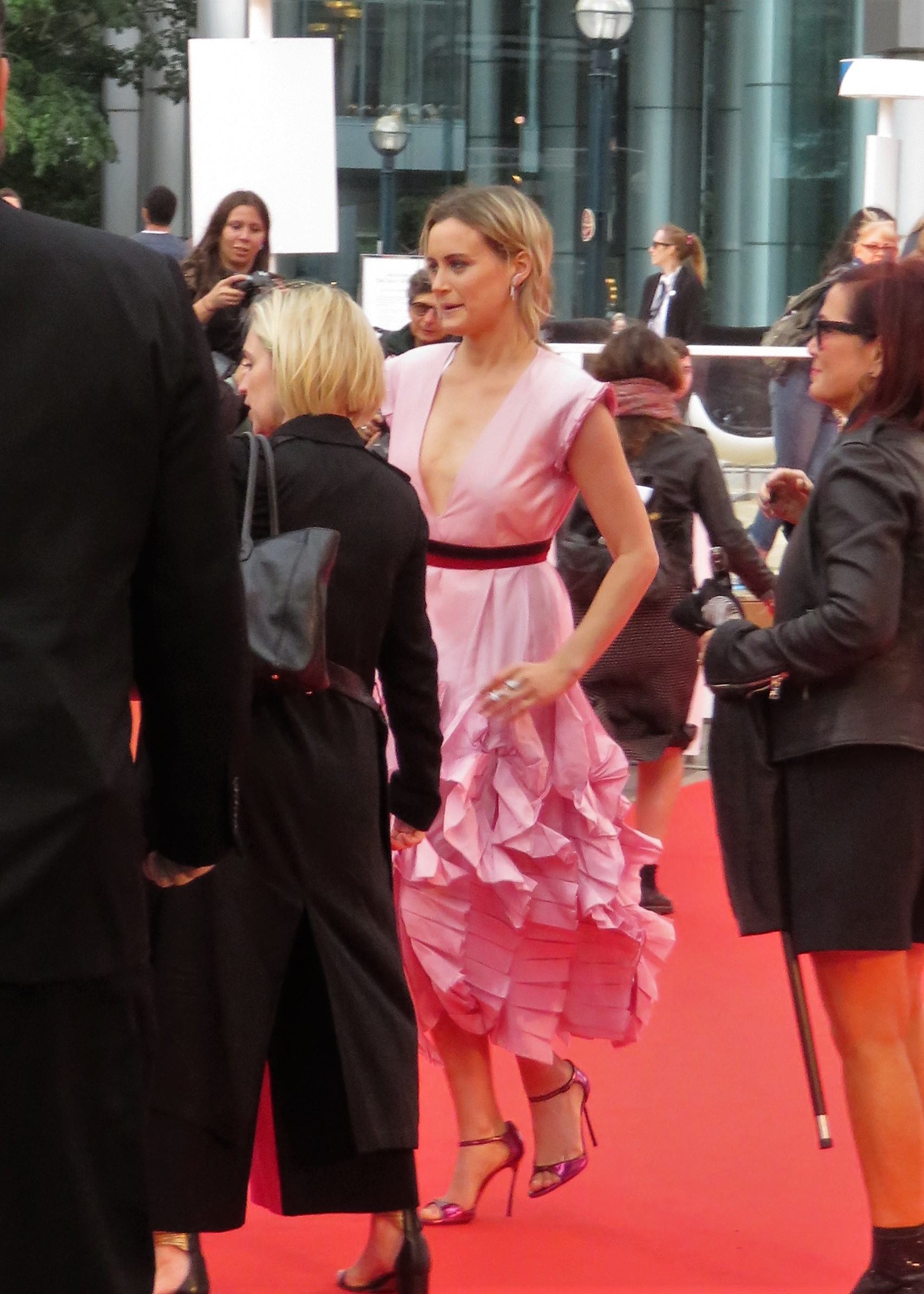
Schilling at the premiere of The Public at the 2018 Toronto Film Festival

=== 2013–2019: Orange Is the New Black ===
In 2013, Schilling began starring as Piper Chapman in the Netflix comedy-drama series Orange Is the New Black based on Piper Kerman, author of the non-fiction book Orange Is the New Black: My Year in a Women's Prison. For her work on the show, Schilling was nominated for the Golden Globe Award for Best Actress in a Television Series – Drama and the Primetime Emmy Award for Outstanding Lead Actress in a Comedy Series in 2014. She won three Satellite Awards for Best Actress – Television Series Musical or Comedy: in 2013, 2015 and 2016 and three Screen Actors Guild Awards for Outstanding Performance by an Ensemble in a Comedy Series. The series ended in 2019. During her time in Orange Is the New Black, Schilling starred in a number of movies. She played the lead in the 2013 Canadian romantic drama film, Stay directed by Wiebke von Carolsfeld. The film received mostly negative reviews from critics. In 2015 she starred alongside Adam Scott in the sex comedy The Overnight. The film premiered at the 2015 Sundance Film Festival to positive reviews. Also in 2015, Schilling made her off-Broadway debut starring in play A Month in the Country. She made a guest starring appearance in an episode of Drunk History in 2016.

In 2017, Schilling starred in the comedy film Take Me directed by Pat Healy, and appeared in the comedy-drama Phil by Greg Kinnear. She starred alongside Emilio Estevez in the drama film, The Public, which premiered at the 2018 Toronto International Film Festival. She starred alongside Sam Worthington in the science fiction thriller film The Titan, and played the leading role in the comedy film Family, both released in 2018. In 2019, Schilling starred in the horror film The Prodigy.

=== 2020–present ===
In 2020, Schilling starred in an episode of the horror-anthology series, Monsterland. The following year she starred alongside Audra McDonald in the satirical science fiction horror series, The Bite created by Robert King and Michelle King. She was featured as Erica Boyer in the Hulu miniseries Pam & Tommy which premiered February 2, 2022. In 2023 she played the leading role in the Apple TV+ drama series, Dear Edward. She also starred in the horror-thriller film, Queen of Bones directed by Robert Budreau.

In 2024, Schilling made her stage return playing the leading role in Second Stage Theater production of The Apiary.

== Personal life ==
Schilling has refused to define her sexuality. "I've had very serious relationships with lots of people, and I'm a very expansive human," she said in a 2017 interview with The Standard. "There's no part of me that can be put under a label. I really don't fit into a box — that's too reductive... But I've had wonderful relationships. I've had a lot of love, and I don't have any qualms about where it comes from."

In 2020, Schilling revealed in an Instagram post that she was dating Emily Ritz, a musical and visual artist. In 2023, Schilling confirmed in a podcast, Expanders with Jess Rona, that she and Ritz had broken up two years previously.

Schilling practices Transcendental Meditation.

== Filmography ==
=== Film ===
Year	Title	Role	Notes	Ref.
2007	Dark Matter	Jackie		
2011	Atlas Shrugged: Part I	Dagny Taggart		
2012	The Lucky One	Elizabeth "Beth" Green		
2012	Argo	Christine Mendez		
2013	Stay	Abbey		
2015	The Overnight	Emily		
2017	Take Me	Anna St. Blair		
2017	Phil	Samantha Ford		
2018	The Public	Angela		
2018	The Titan	Dr. Abigail Janssen		
2018	Family	Kate Stone		
2019	The Prodigy	Sarah Blume		
2023	Queen of Bones	Ida May		

=== Television ===
Year	Title	Role	Notes	Ref.
2009–2010	Mercy	Veronica Agnes Flanagan Callahan	Lead role; 22 episodes	
2013–2019	Orange Is the New Black	Piper Chapman	Lead role; 90 episodes	
2016	Drunk History	Emily Warren Roebling	Episode: "Landmarks"	
2020	Monsterland	Kate Feldman	Episode: "Plainfield, Illinois"	
2021	The Bite	Lily Leithauser	Main role; 6 episodes	
2022	Pam & Tommy	Erica Gauthier	Miniseries; 4 episodes	
2022–2023	Pantheon	Renee	Voice role; 16 episodes	
2023	Dear Edward	Lacey Curtis	Lead role; 10 episodes	
2023	American Horror Story: Delicate	Herself	Episode: "Preech" (Uncredited)	
2024	Accused	April Harris	Episode: "April's Story"	
2025	Poker Face	Agent Annie Milligan	Episodes: "The Day of the Iguana" & "The End of the Road"	
TBA	What the Dead Know	Ava Ledger	In development	

=== Theatre ===
Year	Title	Role	Notes	Ref.
2015	A Month in the Country	Natalya Petrovna	Off-Broadway; January 29, 2015-February 28, 2015	
2024	The Apiary	Gwen	Off-Broadway; January 31, 2024-February 25, 2024	

== Awards and nominations ==
Year	Association	Category	Nominated work	Result	Ref.
2012	Teen Choice Awards	Choice Movie: Liplock (with Zac Efron)	The Lucky One	Nominated	
2012	Teen Choice Awards	Choice Movie Actress: Romance	The Lucky One	Nominated	
2012	Hollywood Film Festival	Best Cast	Argo	Won	
2013	Satellite Awards	Best Actress – Television Series Musical or Comedy	Orange Is the New Black	Won	
2013	Satellite Awards	Best Cast – Television Series	Orange Is the New Black	Won	
2013	Webby Awards	Best Actress	Orange Is the New Black	Won	
2014	Golden Globe Awards	Best Actress – Television Series Drama	Orange Is the New Black	Nominated	
2014	Primetime Emmy Awards	Outstanding Lead Actress in a Comedy Series	Orange Is the New Black	Nominated	
2015	Golden Globe Awards	Best Actress – Television Series Musical or Comedy	Orange Is the New Black	Nominated	
2015	Satellite Awards	Best Actress – Television Series Musical or Comedy	Orange Is the New Black	Nominated	
2015	Screen Actors Guild Awards	Outstanding Performance by an Ensemble in a Comedy Series	Orange Is the New Black	Won	
2016	Satellite Awards	Best Actress – Television Series Musical or Comedy	Orange Is the New Black	Won	
2016	Screen Actors Guild Awards	Outstanding Performance by an Ensemble in a Comedy Series	Orange Is the New Black	Won	
2017	People's Choice Awards	Favorite Premium Series Actress	Orange Is the New Black	Nominated	
2017	Satellite Awards	Best Actress – Television Series Musical or Comedy	Orange Is the New Black	Won	
2017	Screen Actors Guild Awards	Outstanding Performance by an Ensemble in a Comedy Series	Orange Is the New Black	Won	
2018	Screen Actors Guild Awards	Outstanding Performance by an Ensemble in a Comedy Series	Orange Is the New Black	Nominated	

== See also ==
- LGBTQ culture in New York City
