= Duncan Scott (director) =

American writer and director

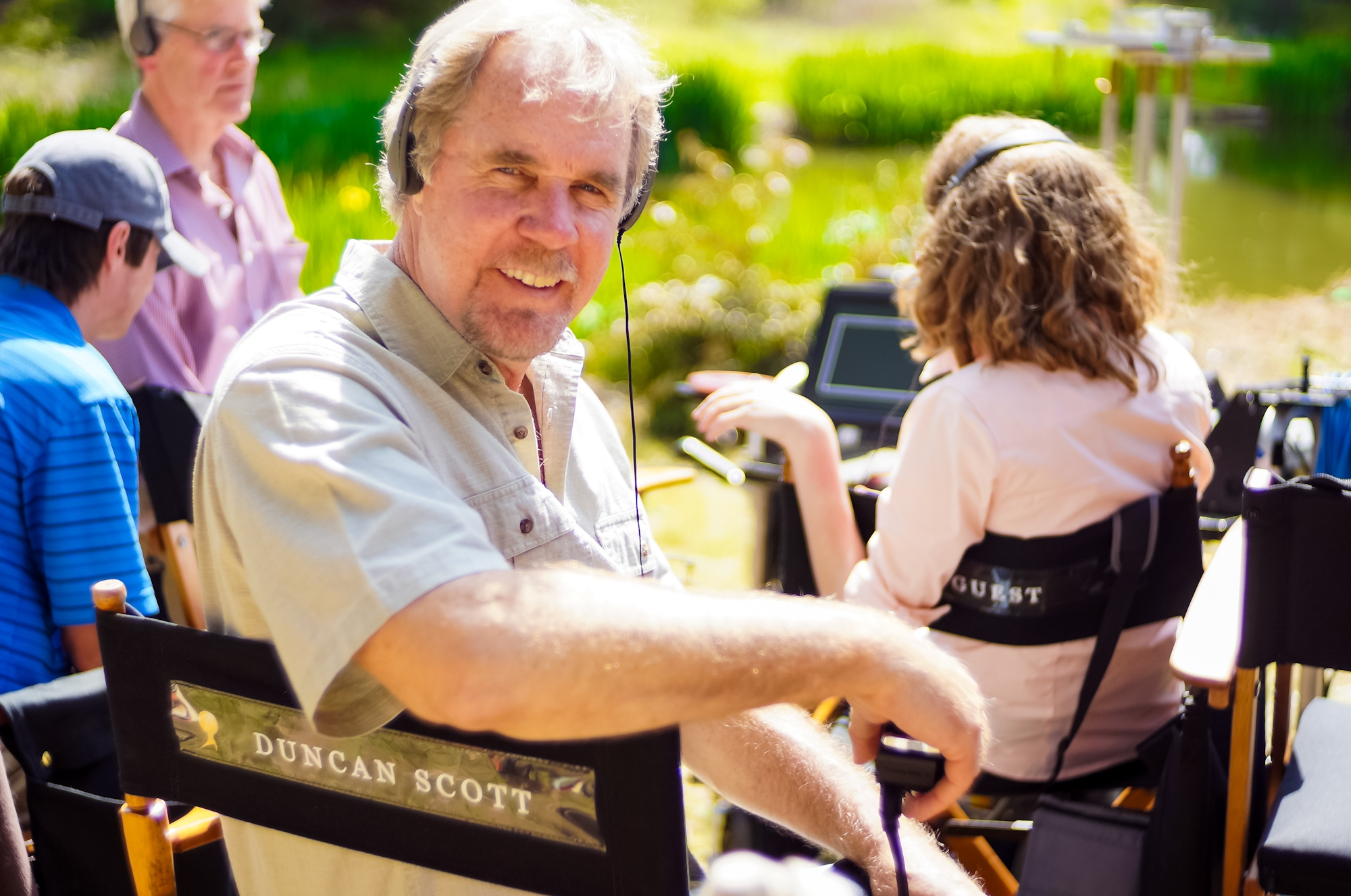
- Scott on the set of Atlas Shrugged, Part II
- Born: 28 May 1947 (age 78); Medford, Massachusetts, US
- Occupation: Filmmaker
- Spouse: Barbara McCredy (m. 2013)
- Children: Samantha Kohn and Annie Scott
- Parent(s): Donald H. Scott and Elizabeth S. MacDonald
- Website: www.duncanscott.com

Duncan Scott (born May 28, 1947) is a film and television writer, director, and producer. Scott was one of the screenwriters of Atlas Shrugged: Part II and Atlas Shrugged: Part III. Early in his career, he became involved in the restoration of the 1942 film We the Living, a project that he continued to be involved in over the next several decades. Scott also directed and produced for television, winning several Emmy and Telly Awards, as well as being nominated for a Peabody Award.

== Career ==
Scott began his career as a film editor. In 1969, he began working with Ayn Rand on re-editing an American version of the once-censored Italian film We the Living, a film based on Rand's first novel. Scott has been interviewed several times about his involvement in the restoration of We the Living. His company, Duncan Scott Productions, now owns and distributes the film which stars Rossano Brazzi and Alida Valli.

Duncan worked as an assistant director on feature films alongside filmmakers Woody Allen and Sidney Lumet, on films such as Deathtrap, A Midsummer Night's Sex Comedy, and Zelig. In television, Scott produced and directed over thirty half-hour programs for the PBS public television series, Innovation. Duncan directed musician Eric Clapton for a public service announcement, interviewed anthropologist Margaret Mead for a documentary, and has worked with other notable figures.

Duncan has also written and directed for the stage, adapting Rand’s short novel, Anthem, which premiered at Chapman University in Orange County, CA.

Scott's work on subjects related to Ayn Rand and her philosophy have continued over the decades. He was a consultant on The Passion of Ayn Rand, a film on the life of Ayn Rand, based on the biography by Barbara Branden. More recently, he was one of the screenwriters of the motion picture Atlas Shrugged: Part II, which was released in October 2012, and Atlas Shrugged: Part III. Additionally, Duncan is the Director of the non-profit Objectivist History Project, which documents the history of the Objectivist movement. He is also currently developing a feature-length documentary about Rand.

== Selected filmography ==
- Nighthawks (film) (1981)
- Deathtrap (film) (1982)
- A Midsummer Night's Sex Comedy (1982)
- Zelig (1983)
- We the Living (restored version, 1986)
- The Passion of Ayn Rand (film) (1999)
- Atlas Shrugged: Part II (2012)
- Atlas Shrugged: Part III (2014)

== Awards and nominations ==
- What If (1996) - Emmy® Award, Outstanding Direction - Public Service Announcement - New York
- The Team (1995) - Emmy® Award Nomination
- The Team (1995) - Gold Telly Award
- What If (1995) - Silver Telly Award
- Safe & Sound (1994) - Emmy® Award, Outstanding Direction - Public Service Announcement - New York
- Innovation (1989) - Emmy® Award, Outstanding Reality Series - New York
- The New Literacy (1986) - Emmy® Award, Outstanding Reality Program - New York
