= Edi Gathegi =

Kenyan-American actor (born 1979)

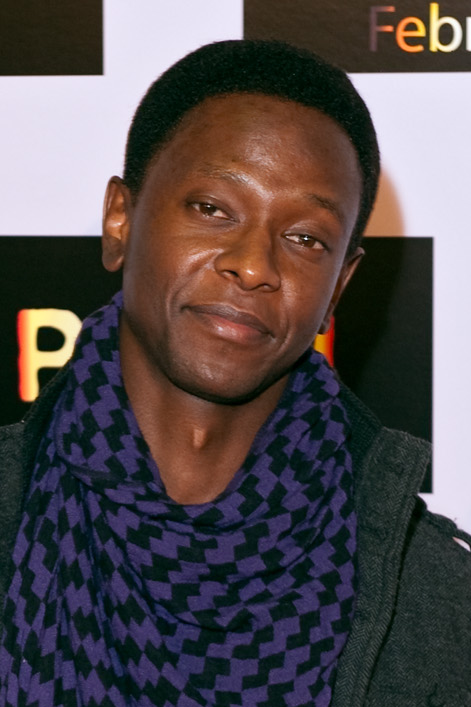
- Gathegi in 2009
- Born: Edi Mūe Gathegi; March 10, 1979 (age 47); Nairobi, Nairobi City County, Kenya
- Education: University of California, Santa Barbara (BA); New York University (MFA)
- Occupation: Actor
- Years active: 2006–present
- Spouse: Adriana Marinescu (m. 2018)

Edi Mūe Gathegi (/ˈɛdi ˈmweɪ ɡəˈθɛɡi/; born March 10, 1979) is a Kenyan-American actor. He had his breakthrough playing Dr. Jeffrey "Big Love" Cole on the fourth season of the television series House (2007), followed by his roles as Cheese in the 2007 film Gone Baby Gone, vampire Laurent in the films Twilight and its sequel The Twilight Saga: New Moon, and as Darwin in X-Men: First Class. He played covert operative Matias Solomon on The Blacklist, which he reprised for the spinoff series The Blacklist: Redemption.

Gathegi is also featured in the AMC series Into the Badlands as Baron Jacobee. He has also played a leading role in Startup, a television drama series on Crackle. Since 2022, Gathegi has played engineer and entrepreneur Dev Ayesa in the Apple TV+ original science fiction space drama series For All Mankind, and played Mister Terrific in the DC Universe film Superman (2025).

== Early life ==
Born on March 10, 1979, in Nairobi, Kenya, Gathegi grew up in Albany, California, U.S. Gathegi attended the University of California, Santa Barbara, where he played basketball until a knee injury ended his career. Gathegi then began taking acting classes. He studied at New York University's Graduate Acting Program at the Tisch School of the Arts, graduating in 2005. Gathegi's career began in theatre, and his stage credits include Two Trains Running at the Old Globe Theatre, As You Like It, Twelfth Night, Othello, A Midsummer Night's Dream, and Cyrano de Bergerac, among others.

== Career ==
Gathegi's first professional role was the Haitian Cabbie in the 2006 film, Crank. Though he had originally auditioned for the role of Kaylo, the producers gave the role to Efren Ramirez and instead offered Gathegi an appearance as the Haitian Cabbie. He was skeptical at first about performing a Haitian accent but was coached by a Haitian friend. In 2007, after guest-starring on Lincoln Heights and Veronica Mars, Gathegi went on to star as Bodie in Death Sentence, Darudi in The Fifth Patient, and Cheese in Gone Baby Gone. He later had a recurring role as Mormon intern Dr. Jeffrey Cole in the television medical drama House. His character was often mocked for his religious beliefs by Dr. House, who himself is an atheist. He also guest-starred in CSI: Miami, CSI: Crime Scene Investigation and Life on Mars in 2008 before being cast as Laurent in Twilight. When Gathegi first auditioned for the 2008 film, adapted from the same-titled first book in Stephenie Meyer's Twilight series, he had not heard of the series and was not aware that his character was a vampire. Gathegi later read the whole series and now considers himself a hardcore fan.

He portrayed Eddie Willers in Atlas Shrugged (2011), based on Ayn Rand's novel of the same name. He later portrayed another Haitian character, Jean Baptiste, in the fifth season of Justified, but was unhappy with the role and asked to be written off the show. He has also been a recurring character in NBC's television series The Blacklist as Matias Solomon, an operative for a covert organization. Gathegi reprised the role in the 2016–2017 season crime thriller The Blacklist: Redemption. He also portrays the character Ronald Dacey on StartUp. In July 2025, Gathegi appeared as Mister Terrific in the DC Universe (DCU) film Superman (2025).

== Personal life ==
Gathegi married Romanian dancer Adriana Marinescu in 2018.

== Filmography ==
=== Film ===
Year	Title	Role	Notes
2006	Crank	Haitian Cabbie	
2007	Gone Baby Gone	Cheese	
2007	The Fifth Patient	Darudi	
2007	Death Sentence	Bodie	
2008	Twilight	Laurent	
2009	My Bloody Valentine 3D	Deputy Martin	
2009	The Twilight Saga: New Moon	Laurent	
2010	This Is Not a Movie	Ghost of Jimmy	
2011	X-Men: First Class	Armando Muñoz / Darwin	
2011	Atlas Shrugged	Eddie Willers	
2011	The Twilight Saga: Breaking Dawn - Part I	Laurent	Flashback only
2014	Bleeding Heart	Dex	
2015	This Isn't Funny	Ryan	
2015	Aloha	Lt. Col. Curtis	
2015	Criminal Activities	Marques	
2016	The Watcher	Noah	
2018	Pimp	Kenny Wayne	
2018	Better Start Running	Fitz Paradise	
2019	Princess of the Row	Beaumont "Bo" Willis	Also producer
2020	The Last Thing He Wanted	Jones	
2021	Caged	Harlow Reid	Also executive producer
2021	The Harder They Fall	Bill Pickett	
2023	Aporia	Mal	
2025	Superman	Michael Holt / Mister Terrific	
2027	Man of Tomorrow †	Michael Holt / Mister Terrific	Post-production
2028	Miami Vice '85 †		Filming

=== Television ===
Year	Title	Role	Notes
2007	House	Dr. Jeffrey Cole	Recurring role; 7 episodes
2007	Lincoln Heights	Boa	3 episodes
2007	Veronica Mars	Zeke Molinda	Episode: "I Know What You'll Do Next Summer"
2008	CSI: Miami	Freddie Mays	Episode: "Tunnel Vision"
2008	Life on Mars	Fletcher Bellow	Episode: "Things to Do in New York When You Think You're Dead"
2008	CSI: Crime Scene Investigation	Skinny Dude	Episode: "Leave Out All the Rest"
2011	Nikita	Kalume Ungara	Episode: "Girl's Best Friend"
2012	Phineas and Ferb	Iggy/Various characters	2 episodes
2013	The Family Tools	Darren Poynton	Main role; 10 episodes
2013	Beauty & the Beast	Kyle	3 episodes
2013	Red Widow	Leon	3 episodes
2014	Justified	Jean Baptiste	4 episodes
2014	Wild Card	Tres	Unsold television pilot
2015	Proof	Zed	Main role; 10 episodes
2015–2016	The Blacklist	Matias Solomon	Recurring role; 13 episodes
2015	Into the Badlands	Jacobee	2 episodes
2016–2018	StartUp	Ronald Dacey	Main role; 30 episodes
2017	The Blacklist: Redemption	Matias Solomon	Main role; 8 episodes
2020	Briarpatch	A.D. Singe	Main role
2022	The Guardians of Justice	Mr. Smiles	7 episodes
2022–present	For All Mankind	Dev Ayesa	Main role; season 3–present

=== Audio ===
Year	Title	Role	Notes
2023	The Mantawauk Caves	James Fincher	Main role; podcast

== Awards and nominations ==
Award	Date of ceremony	Category	Nominated work	Result	Ref.
Astra TV Awards	January 8, 2024	Best Supporting Actor in a Streaming Drama Series	For All Mankind	Nominated	
Black Reel Awards	February 28, 2022	Outstanding Breakthrough Performance, Male	The Harder They Fall	Nominated	
Critics' Choice Super Awards	August 6, 2026	Best Actor in a Superhero Movie	Superman	Nominated	
Drama Desk Awards	June 3, 2018	Special Award (Note: Shared with Sean Carvajal) (Note: For last-minute entrances into the Signature Theatre Company production of Jesus Hopped the 'A' Train, ensuring it had a happy real-life ending after replacing Reg E. Cathey in late September for an October 5th first preview)	Jesus Hopped the 'A' Train	Honored	
Gotham Awards	November 29, 2021	Ensemble Tribute Award (Note: Shared with Jonathan Majors, Zazie Beetz, Delroy Lindo, LaKeith Stanfield, Danielle Deadwyler & RJ Cyler)	The Harder They Fall	Won	
Los Angeles Drama Critics Circle Awards	March 19, 2012	Lead Actor in a Play	Superior Donuts	Won	
Lucille Lortel Awards	May 6, 2018	Outstanding Featured Actor in a Play	Jesus Hopped the 'A' Train	Nominated	
Method Fest Independent Film Festival	March 22–28, 2019	Audience Award (Note: Shared with Van Maximilian Carlson & A Shawn Austin)	Princess of the Row	Won	
Method Fest Independent Film Festival	March 22–28, 2019	Breakout Acting Award	Princess of the Row	Won	
Obie Awards	May 18, 2018	Distinguished Performance by an Actor (Note: Shared with Sean Carvajal)	Jesus Hopped the 'A' Train	Won	
Ovation Awards	September 19, 2011	Featured Actor in a Play	Superior Donuts	Nominated	
Saturn Awards	March 8, 2026	Best Supporting Actor	Superman	Nominated	
Teen Choice Awards	August 7, 2011	Choice Movie: Chemistry (Note: Shared with Lucas Till, Jennifer Lawrence, Nicholas Hoult, Zoë Kravitz & Caleb Landry Jones)	X-Men: First Class	Nominated	
