= Tamara Holder =

American lawyer

- Holder in 2026
- Born: July 7, 1979 (age 47); United States
- Education: University of Arizona
- Occupations: Criminal defense attorney, television commentator, writer
- Website: https://tamaraholderlaw.com/

Tamara Nora Holder is an American attorney, author and television commentator. She is a former contributor and guest host on the Fox News Channel.

== Career ==
Holder grew up in La Junta, Colorado. She is a graduate of the University of Arizona and the John Marshall Law School in Chicago, Illinois.

Holder is a former Fox News Channel contributor. Prior to Fox News Channel, she was a frequent guest on CNN, HLN and TruTV. She has written for The Huffington Post, The Daily Caller and GrassRoots (a medical marijuana magazine). Holder is a frequent radio guest on WABC's Hannity and guest co-hosted the show on December 26, 2012, with Bernard McGuirk. Holder guest hosted The Five on March 12 and 13, 2012. On July 12, 2007, Holder testified as an expert witness before the Congressional Committee of Transportation, Sub-Committee of Maritime and Infrastructure. Holder wrote the foreword to the book, Hanging on by My Fingernails. She also appeared in the 2012 film, Atlas Shrugged: Part II, in which she played herself, alongside Sean Hannity, Juan Williams and Bob Beckel.

In the summer of 2016, Holder alleged that she had been sexually assaulted the previous year by a male executive at Fox News. After investigation, the executive involved, Francisco Cortes, was fired and a financial settlement with Holder was reached in 2017. Holder departed Fox News when her contract expired on January 1, 2017. After leaving Fox News, Tamara was interviewed by Amanda Knox for her show "The Scarlet Letter Reports" on VICE.

Tamara built a national case against Twin Peaks Restaurants, representing over 50 workers for allegations of sexual harassment in the workplace and retaliation. Her case was on the front page of the Chicago Tribune - the case was also featured in the Dallas Morning News

Tamara then spearheaded the doctor-patient sexual abuse case against Chicagoland OBGYN Fabio Ortega. The first cases were filed in January 2019. Ortega pleaded guilty to abusing one of Holder's clients. The cases reportedly settled in 2024 and were reportedly dismissed in 2025.

In 2025, Holder and her partner Elizabeth Hanley filed Jane Doe 100 against OBGYN Mark Mulholland. On September 2, 2025, a woman who Holder represents in the case against Dr. Mulholland reported Mulholland to the Richland Police.

Holder launched the Divided Sky Women's Scholarship Fund in 2025. The Divided Sky Foundation is a recovery center, located in Vermont, founded by Phish frontman Trey Anastasio and his former drug court counselor Melanie Gulde.
