= Atlas Shrugged Part III: Who Is John Galt? =

2014 film by J. James Manera

- Theatrical release poster
- Directed by: J. James Manera
- Screenplay by: J. James Manera; Harmon Kaslow; John Aglialoro
- Based on: Atlas Shrugged by Ayn Rand
- Produced by: Harmon Kaslow; John Aglialoro
- Starring: Kristoffer Polaha; Laura Regan; Greg Germann; Eric Allan Kramer; Tony Denison; Mark Moses; Lew Temple; Stephen Tobolowsky; Peter Mackenzie; Larry Cedar; Louis Herthum; Neil Dickson; Rob Morrow; Joaquim de Almeida
- Cinematography: Gale Tattersall
- Edited by: Tony Ciccone
- Music by: Elia Cmiral
- Distributed by: Atlas Distribution Company
- Release date: September 12, 2014
- Running time: 99 minutes
- Country: United States
- Language: English
- Budget: $5 million
- Box office: $851,690

Atlas Shrugged Part III: Who Is John Galt? is a 2014 American science fiction political drama film serving as the final installment in a trilogy adapting Ayn Rand's 1957 novel Atlas Shrugged. The film features no cast members from Atlas Shrugged: Part II (2012), which itself featured no returning cast members from Atlas Shrugged: Part I (2011), while continuing the story where its predecessor left off. Written and directed by J. James Manera, the film stars Kristoffer Polaha, Laura Regan, Greg Germann, Eric Allan Kramer, Tony Denison, Mark Moses, Lew Temple, Stephen Tobolowsky, Peter Mackenzie, Larry Cedar, Louis Herthum, Neil Dickson, Rob Morrow and Joaquim de Almeida.

The release, originally set for July 4, occurred on September 12, 2014. Like its predecessors, Atlas Shrugged Part III: Who Is John Galt? was a financial and critical failure.

== Plot ==
The owner of the 20th-century Motor Company has died and his children have taken over, with a new plan to operate the company: that everyone work as hard as he can, but that salaries be "based on need". A lab engineer named John Galt objects and announces, "I'll stop the motor of the world."

Twelve years later, the economy of the United States spirals downward. Shortages have grounded airlines and returned the railroads to dominance; over-regulation has led to financial disaster. Galt seems to be behind the disappearances of corporate executives and other experts. The latest disappearance is that of Dagny Taggart, the executive officer of the largest railroad company, Taggart Transcontinental. She had chased Galt in a private plane and crashed hers.

Dagny has reached Galt's Gulch, and Galt himself rescues her from the crashed plane. She meets several "disappeared" achievers, such as banker Midas Mulligan, who say they quit after coming to believe that government was enslaving them. On the outside, the government develops a classified new weapon called "Project F" and nationalizes the railroads, including Taggart Transcontinental.

The public grows increasingly frustrated with the central planning, comes to view Galt as the solution, and holds rallies calling for him to reform the government. Thompson, the Head of State, (Note: Rand deliberately avoided referring to the American "president" so that her novel would not be taken as commentary on specific presidents.) offers Galt a job in the government, but Galt rebuffs the offer. Later, the government tortures Galt using the power of "Project F". However, others from the Gulch arrive to free him and they escape back to their refuge as the power grid around New York City begins to collapse.

== Cast ==
- Laura Regan as Dagny Taggart
- Kristoffer Polaha as John Galt
- Joaquim de Almeida as Francisco d'Anconia
- Eric Allan Kramer as Ragnar Danneskjöld
- Tony Denison as Cuffy Meigs
- Rob Morrow as Henry "Hank" Rearden
- Larry Cedar as Dr. Floyd Ferris
- Greg Germann as James Taggart
- Jen Nikolaisen as Cherryl Taggart (née Brooks)
- Louis Herthum as Wesley Mouch
- Dominic Daniel as Eddie Willers
- Peter Mackenzie as Head of State Thompson
- Mark Moses as Midas Mulligan
- Lew Temple as Ellis Wyatt
- Stephen Tobolowsky as Dr. Hugh Akston
- Neil Dickson as Dr. Robert Stadler
- Ron Paul, Glenn Beck, and Sean Hannity as themselves

== Production ==
=== Development ===
In an interview with Bill Frezza of Forbes, producer John Aglialoro mentioned that the film would include a short dialogue between the heroine Dagny Taggart and a priest, a character which he said Rand struggled with and ultimately cut out of the original book. This scene did not appear in the final cut.

A month prior to the release of Part I, Aglialoro suggested that Part III might be made into a musical. In 2013 he promised to create "something closer to the book", and predicted that critics would pan the film. In a YouTube promotional piece where organizers discussed the film, he asserted that it was vital for the team to have a director who is professional, collaborative, and knows Rand's work: "I don't care if I've got to fire five directors — that's fine. We're going to get it right." The film was ultimately directed by J. James Manera.

=== Writing ===
David Kelley, founder of the Atlas Society and an expert on the philosophical themes of Atlas Shrugged, consulted on the script, as he did for the previous installments.

=== Casting ===
As with the second part, a new set of actors was cast to play the major characters. Former Congressman and Presidential candidate Ron Paul, and network commentators Glenn Beck and Sean Hannity, played themselves giving responses to John Galt's speech.

=== Filming ===
The trade press reported that filming began in January 2014, after the film posted on Facebook that its target start date was Autumn 2013. The budget was partially funded by a Kickstarter campaign that raised $446,907 against a goal of $250,000.

== Release ==
=== Marketing ===
A sneak preview was shown at the Anthem Film Festival in Las Vegas, Nevada in July 2014.

=== Box office ===
The film opened on September 12, 2014 on 242 screens and grossed $461,179 during its opening weekend. Total gross was $851,690 against a budget of $5,000,000.

== Reception ==
The film was universally panned, holding a 0% on Rotten Tomatoes, based on 10 reviews for an average rating of 1.4/10. On Metacritic, the film has a 9/100 rating based on 7 critics, indicating "overwhelming dislike". Alan Scherstuhl of The Village Voice wrote: "Rand's parable is meant to showcase just how much our world needs the best of us, but this adaptation only does so accidentally – by revealing what movies would be like if none of the best of us worked on them."

Writing for The Austin Chronicle, Louis Black said: "In 1949, when Warner Bros. filmed The Fountainhead, Rand threatened to burn down the studio if they compromised her novel. I'd like to think that if she were alive she'd be looking for lighter fluid for this one."

Atlas Shrugged: Part III was nominated for Worst Prequel, Remake, Rip-off or Sequel at the 35th Golden Raspberry Awards.
