= Elia Cmíral =

Czech composer (born 1950)

Elia David Cmíral (/ˈsmɪrəl/; born October 1, 1950) is a Czech composer for film, television, ballet, and video games. He has worked on numerous projects across multiple genres, though he is arguably best known for his work in the thriller and horror cinema, and has collaborated with filmmakers like Wes Craven, John Frankenheimer, John Travolta, and Ernest Dickerson.

== Early life and career ==
Cmíral was born in Czechoslovakia, to an actress and a stage director, and was the grandson of one of Antonín Dvořák's pupils. Cmiral attended the Prague Conservatory, where he studied composition and double bass. His first scoring opportunity came with his father's production of Cyrano de Bergerac. He emigrated to Sweden, where he composed for a number of European films, television shows, and stage productions. In 1987 he moved to the United States, where he attended the University of Southern California to study scoring for television and film and scored for an independent film entitled Apartment Zero.

As a composer, he is best known for his work in the horror and thriller film genres, with notable examples including Ronin, Bones, Stigmata, They, Wrong Turn, Pulse and Piranha 3DD. He also composed for the television series Nash Bridges and the first and third entries in the Atlas Shrugged film series, an adaptation of the best-selling Ayn Rand novel of the same name. He also composed music for the award-winning adventure game The Last Express and the third-person shooter Spec Ops: The Line. As well as working in Hollywood, he has also composed numerous scores for films made in Sweden and the Czech Republic.

== Personal life ==
Cmíral currently resides in Sherman Oaks, Los Angeles.

== Filmography ==
=== Feature films ===
- 2019 - Safe Inside
- 2016 - Doubles
- 2015 - Any Day
- 2014 - Atlas Shrugged Part III: Who Is John Galt?
- 2014 - Cam2Cam
- 2012 - Piranha 3DD
- 2012 - Rites of Passage
- 2011 - Atlas Shrugged: Part I
- 2010 - Lost Boys: The Thirst (video)
- 2010 - Habermann
- 2010 - The Killing Jar
- 2009 - Forget Me Not
- 2008 - Pulse 3 (video)
- 2008 - Splinter
- 2008 - Pulse 2: Afterlife (video)
- 2007 - Missionary Man
- 2007 - Tooth and Nail
- 2007 - The Deaths of Ian Stone
- 2006 - Pulse
- 2006 - Journey to the End of the Night
- 2005 - The Cutter (video)
- 2005 - The Mechanik
- 2005 - Iowa
- 2003 - Wrong Turn
- 2002 - They
- 2001 - Bones
- 2000 - Battlefield Earth
- 1999 - Stigmata
- 1999 - The Wishing Tree
- 1998 - Ronin
- 1996 - Somebody Is Waiting
- 1995 - The Way Through Hell
- 1993 - (Sökarna)
- 1988 - Apartment Zero
- 1988 - En hundsaga
- 1986 - A Matter of Life and Death

=== Other ===
- 2017 - Lacrimosa (short)
- 2010 - Call Me Bill (short)
- 2003 - Son of Satan
- 2003 - Eliza Dushku: Babe in the Woods (video documentary short)
- 2003 - Fresh Meat: The Wounds of 'Wrong Turn' (video documentary short)
- 2003 - Stan Winston: Monster Mogul (video documentary short)
- 2002 - Diggin' Up 'Bones' (video short)
- 1999 - The Decadent Visitor (short)
- 1998 - Prophecies (documentary)
- 1998 - Visions of America (documentary)
- 1997 - Babies for Babies (documentary)
- 1997 - Sunsets by Candlelight (documentary)
- 1988 - Alfred Jarry - Superfreak (short)

== Television ==
- 2007 - While the Children Sleep (TV movie)
- 2006 - Blackbeard (TV movie)
- 2005 - The Reading Room (TV movie)
- 2004 - Species III (TV movie)
- 2002 - The Rats (TV movie)
- 1996 - Nash Bridges (TV series; Season 1, and first theme)
- 1993 - Macklean (TV mini-series)
- 1991 - Rosenholm (TV series)
- 1991 - Barnens Detektivbyrå (TV movie)
- 1991 - Kopplingen (TV movie)
- 1989 - Flickan vid stenbänken (TV series)

== Video games ==
- 2012 - Spec Ops: The Line
- 1997 - The Last Express
