= John Galt Solutions =

John Galt Solutions, Inc.
- Type: Private company
- Industry: Supply Chain Management; Enterprise Software
- Founded: 1996
- Headquarters: Dallas, Texas, USA
- Key people: Anne Omrod (CEO)
- Number of employees: NA
- Website: johngalt.com

John Galt Solutions is a software company that provides forecasting and supply chain management software.

== Overview ==
John Galt Solutions is a privately held software company that provides forecasting and end-to-end supply chain planning for global enterprises and mid-market companies.

Founded in 1996 and headquartered in Chicago, they claim more than 6,000 customers worldwide use John Galt Solutions products every day.

== History ==
John Galt Solutions was founded in 1996 by Annemarie Omrod. The company is named after the iconic figure in Ayn Rand's novel Atlas Shrugged, John Galt. John Galt Solutions' initial projects involved building data warehouses for utility companies. In 1997, John Galt Solutions built its forecasting tool the ForecastX Wizard. In December 1998, ForecastX competed in the M3 Forecasting Competition, an academic forecasting accuracy competition sponsored by INSEAD (the European Institute of Business Administration), finishing in the top two positions in all categories.

In conjunction with Holt Wilson (Central Michigan University) and Barry Keating (Notre Dame University), John Galt Solutions published Business Forecasting (6th Edition).

The company has strategic partnerships with PeopleSoft, Oracle, Infor and QAD.
