= Paul Johansson =

Canadian actor (born 1964)

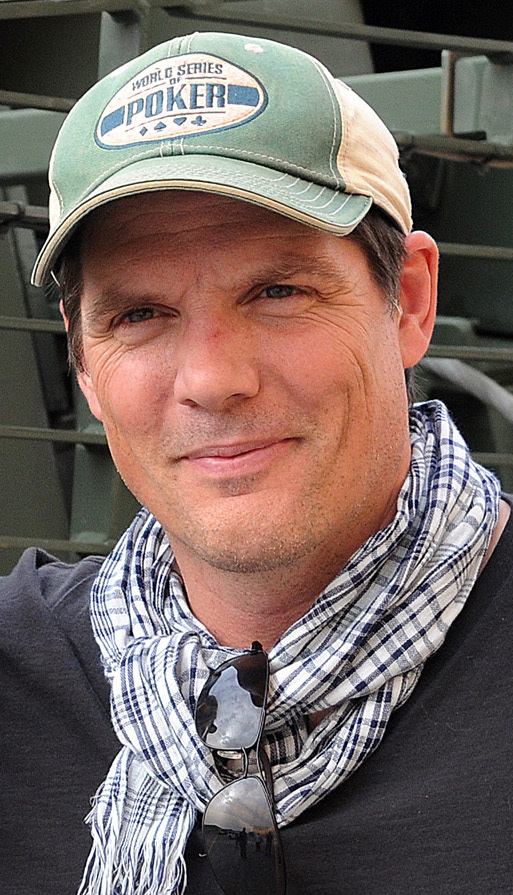
- Johansson at Camp As Sayliyah, Qatar in 2009
- Born: January 26, 1964 (age 62); Spokane, Washington, U.S.
- Occupations: Actor; film director
- Years active: 1989–present

Paul Johansson (born January 26, 1964) is an American actor and director in film and television, best known for playing Dan Scott on the WB/CW series One Tree Hill, and for his role as Nick Wolfe on the short-lived series Highlander: The Raven, a spin-off of Highlander: The Series. He directed the 2011 film adaptation of Ayn Rand's novel, Atlas Shrugged: Part I.

== Acting career ==
Johansson landed his first role on the soap opera Santa Barbara. He played Greg Hughes from 1989 to 1990. Soon he made appearances in other television shows such as Parker Lewis Can't Lose and Beverly Hills, 90210, and later recurred on Lonesome Dove: The Series and starred on Lonesome Dove: The Outlaw Years.

Johansson became well-known to fans of 90210 for playing John Sears, a fraternity brother who unsuccessfully vied for the affections of Kelly Taylor (Jennie Garth) and set up Steve Sanders (Ian Ziering) to burglarize a professor's office. The character returned for the season 4 finale.

He also appeared in commercials, most notably as the delivery man in a Diet Coke commercial. He has appeared in the films Soapdish, John Q and Alpha Dog, and had a small uncredited role in The Notebook. He portrayed the role of Dan Scott in One Tree Hill beginning in 2003 until the show's end in 2012. In 2003, Johansson wrote and directed the film The Incredible Mrs. Ritchie. He has also directed several episodes of One Tree Hill. In 2006, he starred in Emily Skopov's Novel Romance, alongside Traci Lords and Sherilyn Fenn. He appeared in the 7th season of The Drew Carey Show, playing a sportscaster.

He is the director of Atlas Shrugged: Part I (2011), the first third of a trilogy based on the novel by Ayn Rand. The film received an approval rating of 12% on Rotten Tomatoes based on reviews from 52 critics.

== Personal life ==
His mother, Joanne Leone Johansson, died on October 15, 2011, after a 20-year battle with breast cancer. The eleventh episode of the ninth season of the CW's One Tree Hill (titled "Danny Boy") was dedicated to her memory.

He is the son of professional hockey player Earl Johnson. Earl went by Johnson when he was playing hockey, but he later changed the family name to Johansson to reflect his Swedish heritage.

Paul was born in the US, but raised in Canada. He has citizenship in both countries.

== Filmography ==
=== Film ===
Year	Title	Role	Notes
1991	Soapdish	Blair Brennan/Bolt	
1992	Martial Law 2: Undercover	Spencer Hamilton	Direct-to-video film
1993	Midnight Witness	Paul	
1993	When the Party's Over	Henry	
1997	She's So Lovely	Intern #2	
1998	Carnival of Souls	Michael	
1999	Wishmaster 2: Evil Never Dies	Gregory	Direct-to-video film
2000	Glory Glory	Wes	
2002	John Q	Tuck Lampley	
2002	Edge of Madness	Henry Mullen	
2003	Darkness Falling	Sean Leonard	
2004	Berserker	Barek	
2004	Window Theory	Stu	
2004	The Notebook	Allie's Mom's Ex Boyfriend	Uncredited
2006	Alpha Dog	Peter Johansson	
2006	Novel Romance	Jake Buckley	
2008	Toxic	Gus	
2009	The Boondock Saints II: All Saints Day	Kuntsler	
2011	Atlas Shrugged: Part I	John Galt	
2013	The Winner 3D	Darkman	
2014	Kid Cannabis	Detective Morgan	
2014	The Palmer Supremacy	Ben Compost	
2016	Dear Eleanor	Hugh	
2016	The River Thief	Saul	
2017	Father Africa	Daniel	
2019	Crypto	Brian	
2022	Detective Knight: Redemption	Ricky Conlan	
2023	God Is a Bullet	John Lee	
2023	Muzzle	Officer Reed	
2025	The Roaring Game	Dean Ted Nelson	

=== Television ===
Year	Title	Role	Notes
1989	Swimsuit	Scott Clark	Television movie
1989	Matinee	N/A	Television movie
1989–1990	Santa Barbara	Greg Hughes	Series regular: April 11, 1989 – February 12, 1990
1990	Laker Girls	Bart Jeffris	Television movie
1990	They Came from Outer Space	Doug	Episode: "Undressed for Success"
1991–1992	Parker Lewis Can't Lose	Nick Comstock	Recurring role, 16 episodes
1993–1994	Beverly Hills, 90210	John Sears	Recurring role, 13 episodes
1994	Burke's Law	Avery Drew	Episode: "Who Killed the Beauty Queen?"
1994	The 5 Mrs. Buchanans	Jesse Buchanan	Episode: Pilot
1994–1995	Lonesome Dove: The Series	Austin Peale	Recurring role, 13 episodes
1995–1996	Lonesome Dove: The Outlaw Years	Austin Peale	Main role, 22 episodes
1995	Robin's Hoods	Dean Cavallari	Episode: "Labors of Love"
1996	Ed McBain's 87th Precinct: Ice	Det. Bert Kling	Television movie
1997	Ed McBain's 87th Precinct: Heatwave	Det. Bert Kling	Television movie
1997	7th Heaven	Tom Harrison	Episode: "Choices"
1997	Dead Man's Gun	Sanford Hogan	Episode: "The Black Widow"
1998	Players	Jeff Taylor	Episode: "Confidence Man"
1998	Dharma & Greg	Leonard	Episode: "The Second Coming of Leonard"
1998	Earth: Final Conflict	Sloane	Episode: "Destruction"
1998–1999	Highlander: The Raven	Nick Wolfe	Main role, 22 episodes
1999	First Wave	Hatcher	Episode: "Night Falls"
2000	Hope Island	Steve Kramer	2 episodes
2000	Da Vinci's Inquest	Tom Sprawl	Episode: "It's a Bad Corner"
2000	The Last Dance	Charlie Parker	Television movie
2000	Andromeda	Guderian	Episode: "Double Helix"
2001	The Drew Carey Show	Ron Higgins	Episode: "Bus-ted"
2002	The District	Father Patrick Debreno	Episode: "The Killing Point", "Faith"
2003	The Incredible Mrs. Ritchie	Jack	Television movie Emmy Award for Outstanding Writing in a Children/Youth/Family Special; Nominated - Emmy Award for Outstanding Directing in a Children/Youth/Family Special
2003–2012	One Tree Hill	Dan Scott	Main role (seasons 1–7, 9); Special guest star (season 8); 129 episodes
2006	Mind Games	Michael	Television movie
2008	IQ-145	Ben Compost	Episodes: "Memories of Yesterday", "Door Number Two", "What's Our Plan?"
2012	Criminal Minds	Clark Preston	Episode: "A Thin Line"
2013	CSI: Crime Scene Investigation	Edward Trigg	Episode: "Sheltered"
2013	Stonados	Joe Randall	Television movie
2013	Beauty and The Beast	Curt Windsor	Episode: "Father Knows Best"
2014	House of Secrets	Rick	Television movie
2014	A Daughter's Nightmare	Adam	Television movie
2014–2015	Mad Men	Ferg Donnelly	Episodes: "Severance", "Time & Life", "Lost Horizon"
2015	Bones	Graig Smith	Episode: "The Carpals in the Coy-Wolves"
2015	Love, Again	David Baker	Television movie
2016	Once Upon a Time	Gabriel/Woodcutter	Episode: "Heartless"
2016	The Stepchild	John	Television movie
2016–2018	Van Helsing	Dmitri	Main role
2020	NCIS	Porter Brandt	Episode: "In a Nutshell"

=== As a director ===
Year	Title	Notes
2003	The Incredible Mrs. Ritchie	Television film
2005–2012	One Tree Hill	Television series; 14 episodes
2011	Atlas Shrugged: Part I	Film
2017	Van Helsing	Television series; 2 episodes
