= Brian Patrick O'Toole =

American film producer

- Occupation: Producer, writer

Brian Patrick O'Toole is an American film producer and screenwriter. O'Toole's work includes co-producing the 2002 horror film Dog Soldiers and his screenwriting debut Cemetery Gates. He also wrote a monthly column for the prominent American magazine Fangoria for six years and currently works with Black Gate Entertainment, with whom he has written and produced several films, including Basement Jack, Evilution, Necropolitan and A Necessary Evil. He also wrote the screenplays for the Atlas Shrugged film adaptations.

== Life and work ==
He began his career as a literary agent with the Leslie Kallen Literary Agency and the Helen Garrett Talent Agency before moving on to film producing. Mr. O'Toole's work as script consultant has brought him work with such producers and directors as Sydney Pollack, George A. Romero, Guillermo del Toro, Dan Curtis, Hector Elizondo, Mickey Borofsky, Howard Kazanjian and Neil Marshall, among others. He studied extensively with UCLA's Chairman of Screenwriting Richard Walter and was a member of the Player's Workshop of the Second City in Chicago. Over 20 years of screenwriting and producing career, Mr O'Toole rebooted the werewolf genre with Dog Soldiers, combined horror with comedy in Cemetery Gates, and was one of the first independent filmmakers to use a computer generated character in SleepStalker. In 2007, Mr. O'Toole wrote and produced his first digital films: the zombie actioner Evilution and the thriller Basement Jack. His films have received numerous awards from U.S. and International film festivals. Outside the horror genre, Mr. O'Toole has co-produced the festival favorite Neo Ned and the action thriller Death Valley.

O'Toole also served as the screenwriter for all three installments of the film adaptation of Ayn Rand's Atlas Shrugged.

== Filmography ==
- Atlas Shrugged: Part II (2012) – Screenwriter
- Atlas Shrugged: Part I (2011) – Screenwriter
- Basement Jack (2008) – Producer/Screenwriter
- Evilution (2008) – Producer/Screenwriter
- Cemetery Gates (2006) Co-Producer/Screenwriter
- Boo (2005) – Co-Producer
- Neo Ned (2005) – Co-Producer
- Death Valley (2004) – Co-Producer
- Dog Soldiers (2002) – Co-Producer
- Sleepstalker (1995) Co-Producer
- Mind Twister (1994) – Assistant Producer
