= John Galt =

Character in Atlas Shrugged

- Atlas Shrugged character
- Created by: Ayn Rand
- Portrayed by: Paul Johansson, D. B. Sweeney, Kristoffer Polaha

In-universe information
- Alias: The Destroyer
- Gender: Male
- Occupation: Engineer, inventor, philosopher, laborer

John Galt (/ɡɔːlt/) is a character in Ayn Rand's novel Atlas Shrugged (1957). Although he is not identified by name until the last third of the novel, he is the object of its often-repeated question "Who is John Galt?" and of the quest to discover the answer. Also, in the later part it becomes clear that Galt had been present in the book's plot all along, playing several important roles though not identified by name.

As the plot unfolds, Galt is acknowledged to be a philosopher and inventor; he believes in the power and glory of the human mind, and the rights of individuals to use their minds solely for themselves. He serves as a highly individualistic counterpoint to the collectivist social and economic structure depicted in the novel, in which society is based on oppressive bureaucratic functionaries and a culture that embraces mediocrity in the name of social egalitarianism, which the novel posits is the result of collectivist philosophy.

== Character biography ==
The novel unfolds Galt's story in a progressive retrospective, with Galt, the son of an Ohio garage mechanic, leaving home at age twelve and beginning college at the fictional Patrick Henry University at age sixteen. There he meets Francisco d'Anconia and Ragnar Danneskjöld, who become his two closest friends. Galt takes a double major in physics and philosophy, and after graduating, he becomes an engineer at the Twentieth Century Motor Company, where he designs a revolutionary new motor powered by ambient static electricity. When the company owner dies and his heirs decide to run the factory by the collectivist maxim, "From each according to his ability, to each according to his need", Galt refuses to work there any longer and abandons his motor.

During the main storyline of the book, Galt has secretly organized a strike by the world's creative leaders, including inventors, artists and businessmen, in an effort to "stop the motor of the world" and bring about the collapse of the bureaucratic society. While working incognito as a laborer for Taggart Transcontinental railroad, he travels to visit the key figures that he has not yet recruited, systematically persuading them to join the strike. This strike is not revealed immediately within the story, but forms the backdrop of the novel as a mystery which protagonist Dagny Taggart seeks to uncover, with Galt as her antagonist. She calls him "The Destroyer" and regards him as her arch-enemy, on one occasion seeing a door which just closed and realizing he had been in the room ahead of her. The strikers have created their own secret enclave known as "Galt's Gulch", a town secluded in a Colorado mountain valley, based on Ouray, Colorado.

Galt had been deeply in love with Dagny for years, but knew he could not reveal himself until she would be ready to join his strike. On one night he was struggling with the temptation to knock on her door but restrained himself – and she saw his shadow, but not him. Dagny had always had a concept of an ideal man "at the end of the railway", and her other lovers – Francisco D'Anconia and Hank Rearden – did not fit this image, however much she loved and respected both of them.

While in the valley, Dagny develops a romantic relationship with Galt, although it remains physically unconsummated – which is linked to her refusing to join the strike. After she returns home to New York, Galt takes over the airwaves, delivering a lengthy speech that explains what he sees to be the irrationality of collectivism and offers his own philosophy (Ayn Rand's Objectivism) as an alternative. Galt speaks against what he sees as the evil of collectivism and the idea that individuals must be responsible for each other, and says that should be replaced by voluntary association and adherence to rational self-interest. Seeking Galt after the speech, Dagny accidentally leads the authorities to him, and he is arrested. She and the strikers rescue Galt as the government tortures him. They return to Galt's Gulch and prepare to rebuild the rest of the world, as the collapse of the incompetent government nears.

== Origin ==
Literature professor Shoshana Milgram traces the origins of the character to adventure stories that Rand read as a child, including the French novels La Vallée Mystérieuse and Le Petit Roi d'Ys. Rand also owned a copy of a 1940 novel with characters named Jed and John Peter Galt. There was a 19th-century Scottish novelist of the same name, but Milgram says that any connection to the character is "highly unlikely". Milgram also notes that the name Rand originally picked for her character was Iles Galt.

At least two real people of Rand's acquaintance have been suggested as partial inspirations for Galt. Rand denied any connection to her friend John Gall, a conservative attorney, but did claim some inspiration came from her husband, Frank O'Connor.

Author Justin Raimondo has found parallels between Atlas Shrugged and The Driver, a 1922 novel by Garet Garrett. Garrett's novel has a main character named Henry M. Galt. This Galt is an entrepreneur who takes over a failing railway, turning it into a productive and profitable asset for his benefit and for the rest of the nation. The general population and government turn against him instead of celebrating his success. Raimondo also notes that in The Driver, some characters ask, "Who is Henry M. Galt?", similar to the question "Who is John Galt?" that plays an important role in Atlas Shrugged.

Rand is not the only famous author to invent a character with this name. Pulp fiction author Robert E. Howard, creator of heroes such as Conan the Barbarian, used a villain named John Galt in the tale "Black Talons" in 1933.

== Interpretation ==
The Galt character has been compared to various iconic figures from literature and history. In the novel, he is compared with Prometheus from the Greek myths. English literature scholar Mimi Reisel Gladstein sees similarities to the figures of Arthur and Galahad from the Arthurian legends. Parallels have also been drawn to Captain Nemo, the anti-hero of Jules Verne's 1870 novel Twenty Thousand Leagues Under the Seas, who has likewise turned his back on "civilization" in self-imposed exile with a number of chosen allies, refusing to partake in a society he views as irreconcilably evil and oppressive.

Galt is not necessarily intended to be a rounded or realistic character; he has been called "more a symbol than a person" and "two-dimensional". Mimi Reisel Gladstein describes Galt as "more icon than character". Rand's own notes indicate that she expected the character to have "[n]o progression" and "no inner conflict" because he was "integrated (indivisible) and perfect".

=== "Who is John Galt?" ===
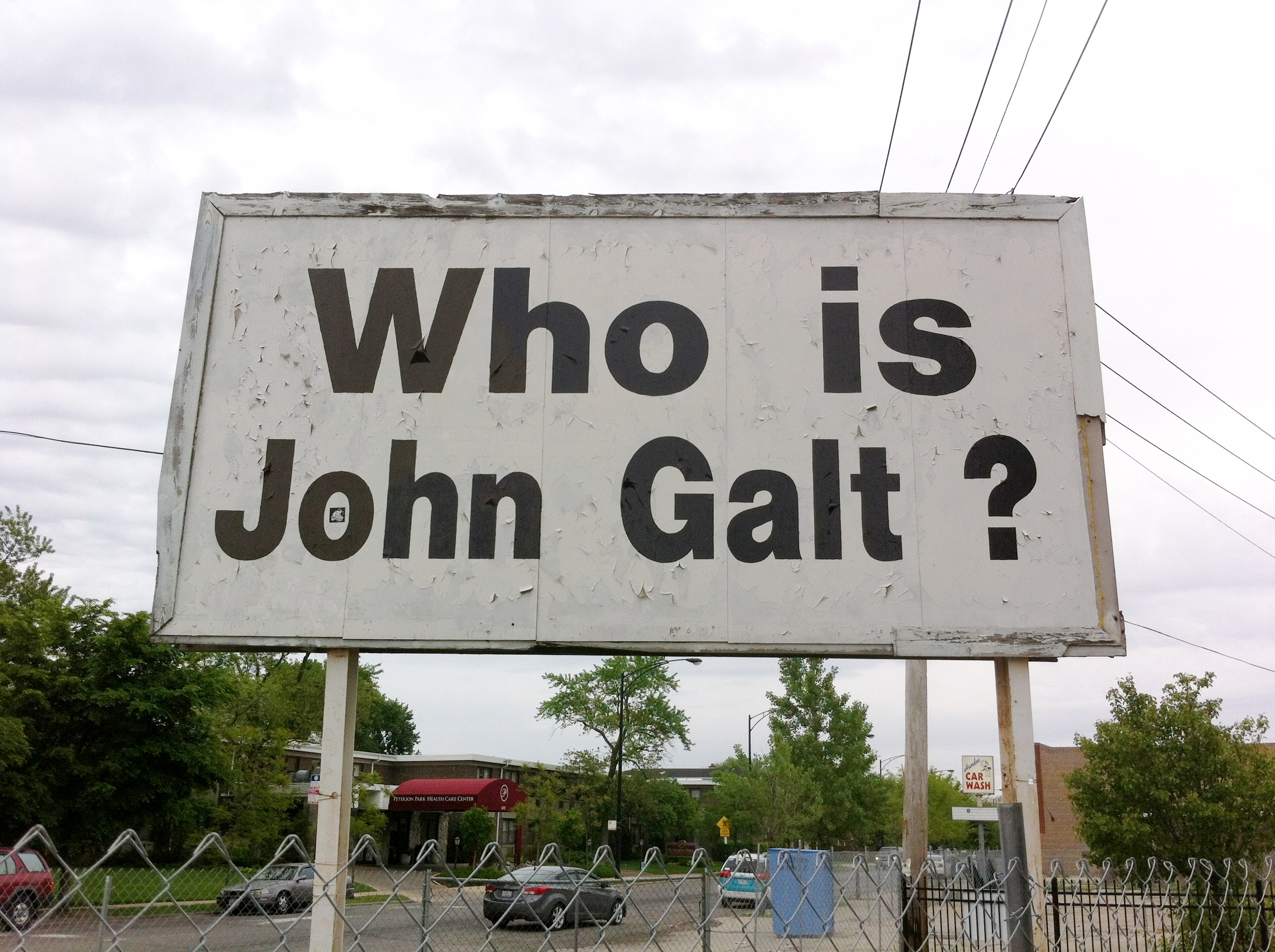
A sign in Chicago with the question "Who is John Galt"

The book's opening line, "Who is John Galt?", becomes an expression of helplessness and despair at the current state of the novel's fictionalized world. The book's protagonist, Dagny Taggart, hears a number of legends of Galt, before finding him. In one legend Galt seeks the lost island of Atlantis, in another he discovers the Fountain of Youth. After eventually joining Galt's cause, Taggart learns that all of the stories have an element of truth to them. She names the Colorado spur of her railroad line the "John Galt Line" which surprises many people. When asked "Who is John Galt?", she replies "We are!"

== Cultural significance ==
"The book's hero, John Galt, also continues to live on", wrote journalist Harriet Rubin in a September 2007 article about the influence of Atlas Shrugged. Rubin mentions John Galt Solutions (a software company) and the John Galt Corporation (a demolition company) as examples of companies named after the character.

The use of Galt as a symbol in the context of political or social protest has taken root in some places. "Who is John Galt?" signs were seen at Tea Party protests held in the United States and at banking protests in London in April 2009. Texas Republican congressman Ron Paul's presidential primary campaign of 2008 included a play on the phrase, using "Who is Ron Paul?" on campaign T-shirts; his web site biography used the same title.

Brandy Melville has a clothing line named after John Galt due to the founder's libertarian ideals, and store locations are often decorated with signs reading "John Galt"

== In other media ==
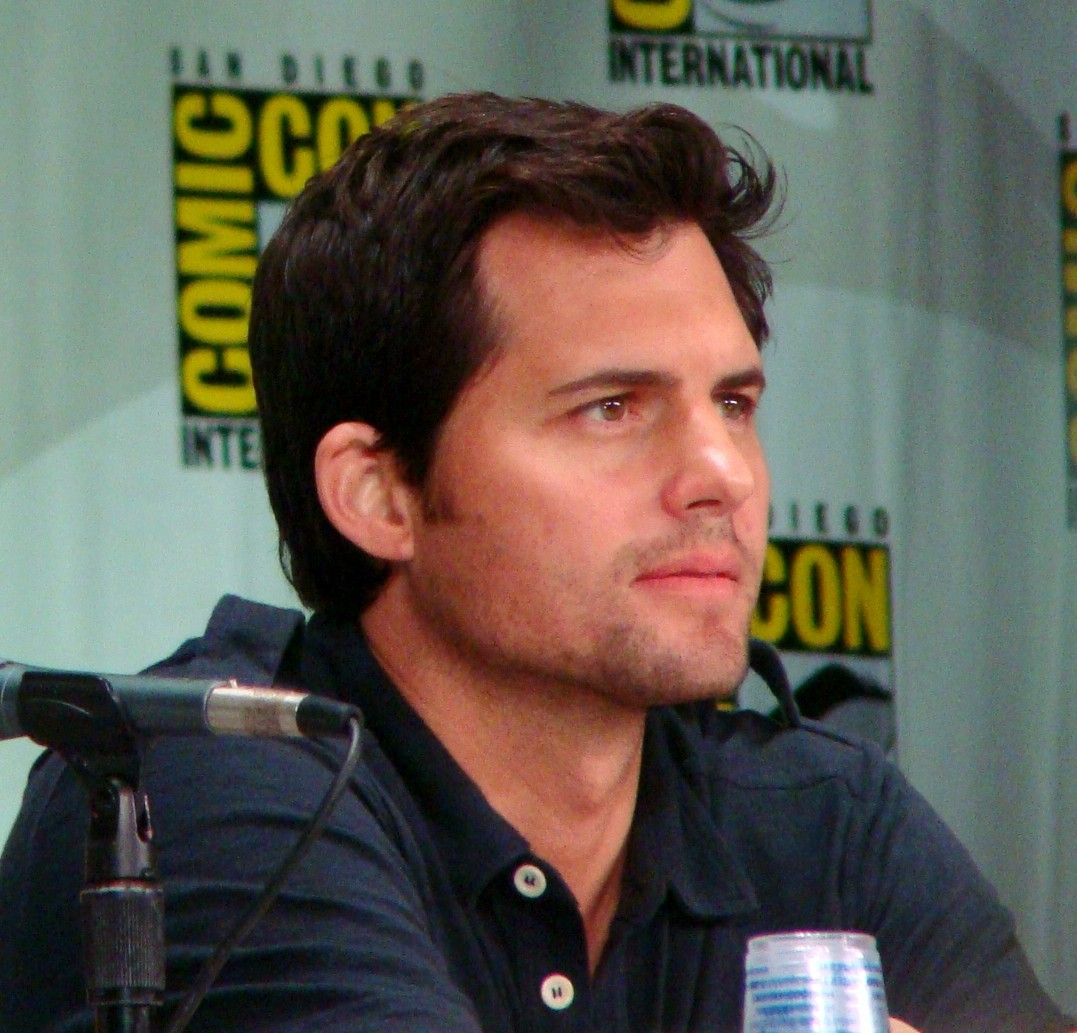
Kristoffer Polaha played Galt in Atlas Shrugged: Part III.

In 2009, For Beginners, LLC released Ayn Rand for Beginners by Andrew Bernstein as part of its ... For Beginners graphic nonfiction comic book series. The illustrations by Own Brozman included a number of drawings of Galt in the section discussing Atlas Shrugged.

From 2011 to 2014, a movie adaptation of Atlas Shrugged was released in three parts. A different actor portrayed Galt in each film. In Atlas Shrugged: Part I, director Paul Johansson played the role, albeit with limited screen time and in shadow. Actor D. B. Sweeney took over the role for Atlas Shrugged: Part II, released in 2012. For the 2014 release of Part III, the role was again recast; this time, the character was played by Kristoffer Polaha.
