= John Galt Corporation =

American demolition and construction contractor

The John Galt Corporation is a demolition and construction contractor based in New York City, which was subcontracted to demolish the Deutsche Bank Building after the building suffered severe damage during the September 11 terrorist attacks on the World Trade Center. The company was involved in multiple scandals related to its work at the site.

The company was founded in 1983 and named for a character from Ayn Rand's novel Atlas Shrugged. The company had apparently done no substantial work of any kind until it was subcontracted by Bovis Lend Lease to demolish the Deutsche Bank Building. The company essentially acted as a shell corporation for the Regional Scaffolding and Hoisting Company and two former Safeway Environmental Corporation executives. The use of a shell corporation is not unusual within the demolition industry, but the participation of Safeway Environmental executives drew attention because of past problems that company had with government contracts, including accusations of ties to criminal organizations.

Three of the company's construction supervisors (Mitchel Alvo, Salvatore DePaola, and Jeffrey Melofchik) were charged for manslaughter and criminally negligent homicide as a result of the deaths of two firefighters in a fire which broke out in August 2007. The John Galt Corporation was also charged. Alvo was acquitted in a bench trial; DePaola and Melofchik were cleared in a jury trial. The company was acquitted of manslaughter, but was convicted of second-degree reckless endangerment, a misdemeanor.

In a separate case, one of the company's purchasing agents, Robert Chiarappa, was sentenced to seven and a half years in prison for embezzling over 1.2 million dollars from the building's demolition. Three other people also pleaded guilty for their involvement in the scheme.
