= List of Atlas Shrugged characters =

This is a list of characters in Ayn Rand's 1957 novel Atlas Shrugged.

== Major characters ==
The following are major characters from the novel. (Note: Characters in this article are listed as "major" if they are described as major or primary characters in surveys of Rand's work (such as Gladstein's The New Ayn Rand Companion), in a book or essay collection about the novel (such as Essays on Ayn Rand's Atlas Shrugged), or in a widely available study guide about the novel (such as CliffsNotes or SparkNotes).)

=== Protagonists ===
==== Dagny Taggart ====
Dagny Taggart is the protagonist of the novel. She is vice president in charge of operations for Taggart Transcontinental, under her brother, James Taggart. Given James's incompetence, Dagny is responsible for all the workings of the railroad.

==== Francisco d'Anconia ====
Francisco d'Anconia is one of the central characters in Atlas Shrugged, an owner by inheritance of the world's largest copper mining operation. He is a childhood friend, and the first love, of Dagny Taggart. A child prodigy of exceptional talents, Francisco was dubbed the "climax" of the d'Anconia line, an already prestigious Argentine family of skilled industrialists. He was a classmate of John Galt and Ragnar Danneskjöld and student of both Hugh Akston and Robert Stadler. He began working while still in school to show that he could have been successful without the aid of his family's wealth. Later, Francisco bankrupts the d'Anconia business to put it out of others' reach. His full name is given as "Francisco Domingo Carlos Andres Sebastián d'Anconia".

==== John Galt ====
John Galt is the primary male hero of Atlas Shrugged. He initially appears as an unnamed menial worker for Taggart Transcontinental, who often dines with Eddie Willers in the employees' cafeteria, and leads Eddie to reveal important information about Dagny Taggart and Taggart Transcontinental. Only Eddie's side of their conversations is given in the novel. Later in the novel, the reader discovers this worker's true identity.

Before working for Taggart Transcontinental, Galt worked as an engineer for the Twentieth Century Motor Company, where he secretly invented a generator of usable electric energy from ambient static electricity, but abandoned his prototype, and his employment, when dissatisfied by an easily corrupted novel system of payment. This prototype was found by Dagny Taggart and Hank Rearden. Galt himself remains concealed throughout much of the novel, working a job and living by himself, where he unites the most skillful inventors and business leaders under his leadership. He delivers a lengthy broadcast speech that presents the author's philosophy of Objectivism.

==== Henry "Hank" Rearden ====
Henry (known as "Hank") Rearden is one of the central characters in Atlas Shrugged. He owns the most important steel company in the United States, and invents Rearden Metal, an alloy stronger, lighter, cheaper and tougher than steel. He lives in Philadelphia with his wife Lillian, his brother Philip, and his elderly mother. Rearden represents a type of self-made man and eventually divorces Lillian, abandons his steel mills following a bloody assault by government-planted workers, and joins John Galt's strike.

==== Eddie Willers ====
Edwin "Eddie" Willers is the Special Assistant to the vice-president in Charge of Operations at Taggart Transcontinental. His father and grandfather worked for the Taggarts, and himself likewise. He is completely loyal to Dagny and to Taggart Transcontinental. Willers does not possess the creative ability of Galt's associates, but matches them in moral courage and is capable of appreciating and making use of their creations. After Dagny shifts her attention and loyalty to saving the captive Galt, Willers maintains the railroad until its collapse.

==== Ragnar Danneskjöld ====
One of Galt's first followers, and world-famous as a pirate, who seizes relief ships sent from the United States to the People's States of Europe. He works to ensure that once those espousing Galt's philosophy are restored to their rightful place in society, they have enough capital to rebuild the world. Kept in the background for much of the book, Danneskjöld makes a personal appearance to encourage Rearden to persevere in his increasingly difficult situation, and gives him a bar of gold as compensation for the income taxes he has paid over the last several years. Danneskjöld is married to the actress Kay Ludlow; their relationship is kept hidden from the outside world, which only knows of Ludlow as a retired film star. Considered a misfit by Galt's other adherents, he views his actions as a means to speed the world along in understanding Galt's perspective.

According to Barbara Branden, who was closely associated with Rand at the time the book was written, there were sections written describing Danneskjöld's adventures at sea, cut from the final published text. In a 1974 comment at a lecture, Rand said that Danneskjöld's name was a tribute to Victor Hugo's novel Hans of Iceland, wherein the hero becomes the first of the Counts of Danneskjöld. In the published book, Danneskjöld is always seen through the eyes of Dagny Taggart or Hank Rearden, except for a brief paragraph in the very last chapter.

=== Antagonists ===
==== James Taggart ====
The President of Taggart Transcontinental and the book's most important antagonist. Taggart is an expert influence peddler but incapable of making operational decisions on his own. He relies on his sister, Dagny Taggart, to actually run the railroad, but nonetheless opposes her in almost every endeavor because of his various anti-capitalist moral and political beliefs. In a sense, he is the antithesis of Dagny. This contradiction leads to the recurring absurdity of his life: the desire to overcome those on whom his life depends, and the horror that he will succeed at this. In the final chapters of the novel, he suffers a complete mental breakdown upon realizing that he can no longer deceive himself in this respect.

==== Lillian Rearden ====
The unsupportive wife of Hank Rearden, who dislikes his habits and (secretly at first) seeks to ruin Rearden to prove her own value. Lillian achieves this, when she passes information to James Taggart about her husband's affair with his sister. This information is used to blackmail Rearden to sign a Gift Certificate which delivers all the property rights of Rearden Metal to others. Lillian thereafter uses James Taggart for sexual satisfaction, until Hank abandons her.

==== Dr. Floyd Ferris ====
Ferris is a biologist who works as "co-ordinator" at the State Science Institute. He uses his position there to deride reason and productive achievement, and publishes a book entitled Why Do You Think You Think? He clashes on several occasions with Hank Rearden, and twice attempts to blackmail Rearden into giving up Rearden Metal. He is also one of the group of looters who tries to get Rearden to agree to the Steel Unification Plan. Ferris hosts the demonstration of the Project X weapon, and is the creator of the Ferris Persuader, a torture machine. When John Galt is captured by the looters, Ferris uses the device on Galt, but it breaks down before extracting the information Ferris wants from Galt. Ferris represents the group which uses brute force on the heroes to achieve the ends of the looters.

==== Dr. Robert Stadler ====
A former professor at Patrick Henry University, and along with colleague Hugh Akston, mentor to Francisco d'Anconia, John Galt, and Ragnar Danneskjöld. He has since become a sell-out, one who had great promise but squandered it for social approval, to the detriment of the free. He works at the State Science Institute where all his inventions are perverted for use by the military, including a sound-based weapon known as Project X (Xylophone). He is killed when Cuffy Meigs (see below) drunkenly overloads the circuits of Project X, causing it to destroy itself and every structure and living thing in a 100-mile radius. The character was, in part, modeled on J. Robert Oppenheimer, whom Rand had interviewed for an earlier project, and his part in the creation of nuclear weapons. To his former student Galt, Stadler represents the epitome of human evil, as the "man who knew better" but chose not to act for the good.

==== Wesley Mouch ====
The incompetent and treacherous lobbyist whom Hank Rearden reluctantly employs in Washington, who rises to prominence and authority throughout the novel through trading favours and disloyalty. In return for betraying Hank by helping broker the Equalization of Opportunity Bill (which, by restricting the number of businesses each person may own to one, forces Hank to divest most of his companies), he is given a senior position at the Bureau of Economic Planning and National Resources. Later in the novel he becomes its Top Co-ordinator, a position that eventually becomes Economic Dictator of the country. Mouch's mantra, whenever a problem arises from his prior policy, is to say, "I can't help it. I need wider powers."

== Secondary characters ==
The following secondary characters also appear in the novel. (Note: Secondary characters are listed if they appear in character lists from any of the works used to establish the list of major characters above, but do not meet the criteria for "major." Minor characters who are not listed in secondary works are not listed here.)

- Hugh Akston is identified as "one of the last great advocates of reason." He was a renowned philosopher and the head of the Department of Philosophy at Patrick Henry University, where he taught Francisco d'Anconia, John Galt, and Ragnar Danneskjöld. He was, along with Robert Stadler, a father figure to these three. Akston's name is so hallowed that a young lady, on hearing that Francisco had studied under him, is shocked. She thought that he must have been one of those great names from an earlier century. He now works as a cook in a roadside diner and proves extremely skillful at the job. When Dagny tracks him down, and before she discovers his true identity, he rejects her enthusiastic offer to manage the dining car services for Taggart Transcontinental. He is based on Aristotle.
- Jeff Allen is a tramp who stows away on a Taggart train during one of Dagny's cross-country trips. Instead of throwing him out, she allows him to ride as her guest. It is from Allen that she learns the full story behind the collapse of the Twentieth Century Motor Company (Rand's extensive metaphor for the inherent flaws of communism) as well as a hint of John Galt's true background.
- Calvin Atwood is owner of Atwood Light and Power Company and joins Galt's strike.
- Mayor Bascom is the mayor of Rome, Wisconsin, who reveals part of the history of the Twentieth Century Motor Company.
- Dr. Blodgett is the scientist who pulls the lever to demonstrate Project X.
- Orren Boyle is the head of Associated Steel, the antithesis of Hank Rearden, and a friend of James Taggart. He is an investor in the San Sebastián mines. He disappears from the story after having a nervous breakdown following the failed "unification" of the steel industry.
- Laura Bradford is an actress and Kip Chalmers's mistress. She is one of the passengers on his train who dies in the Taggart Tunnel disaster.
- Bill Brent is the chief dispatcher for the Colorado Division of Taggart Transcontinental who tries to prevent the Taggart Tunnel disaster.
- Cherryl Brooks is a dime-store shopgirl who marries James Taggart after a chance encounter in her store the night the John Galt Line was falsely deemed his greatest success. She marries him, thinking that he is the heroic person behind Taggart Transcontinental. Cherryl is at first harsh towards Dagny, having believed Jim Taggart's descriptions of his sister, until she questions employees of the railroad. Upon learning that her scorn had been misdirected, Cherryl puts off apologizing to Dagny out of shame but eventually admits to Dagny that when she married Jim, she thought that he had the heroic qualities that she had looked up to—she thought that she was marrying someone like Dagny. Shortly after making this admission, she learns of Jim's infidelity with Lillian Rearden. Jim slaps her in their ensuing verbal fight. She commits suicide by jumping over a stone parapet and into the river, unable to live with her evil husband and seeing no way to escape him and the unsympathetic world that is at odds with her worldview.
- Emma Chalmers, Kip Chalmers's mother, gains some influence after his death. Known as "Kip's Ma," she starts a soybean-growing project in Louisiana and commandeers thousands of railroad freight cars to move the harvest. As a result, the year's wheat crop from Minnesota never reaches the rest of the country but instead rots in storage; also, the soybean crop is lost, having been reaped too early.
- Kip Chalmers is a Washington man who has decided to run for election as legislator from California. On the way to a campaign rally, the Taggart Transcontinental train that is carrying him encounters a split rail, resulting in the destruction of its diesel engine. In response to his demands, a coal-burning steam engine replaces his train's diesel engine and pulls it through an eight-mile tunnel that has insufficient ventilation. The result is the suffocation of all passengers and the destruction of the tunnel, caused when a train hauling military ordnance crashes into Chalmers's train and explodes.
- Tom Colby is the head of the Rearden Steel Workers Union.
- Dan Conway is the middle-aged president of the Phoenix-Durango railroad. Running a railroad is just about the only thing he knows. When the Anti-dog-eat-dog Rule is used to drive his business out of Colorado, he loses the will to fight, and resigns himself to a quiet life of books and fishing. He is not one of those who joined John Galt's strike, his resignation being a personal choice of his own.
- Ken Danagger owns Danagger Coal in Pennsylvania. He helps Hank Rearden illegally make Rearden Metal, then later decides to quit and join Galt's strike moments before Dagny arrives to try to persuade him otherwise.
- Quentin Daniels is an enterprising engineer hired by Dagny Taggart to reconstruct John Galt's motor. Partway through this process, Quentin withdraws his effort for the same reasons John Galt himself had. Dagny's pursuit of Quentin leads her to Galt's Gulch. Galt recognizes in him a younger version of himself, having emulated both Galt's achievements in physics and Galt's social reasoning.
- Balph Eubank is called "the literary leader of the age" despite the fact that no book he has written has sold more than 3,000 copies. He complains that it is disgraceful that artists are treated as peddlers. He advocates a law limiting the sales of books to 10,000 copies. He is a misogynist who thinks it disgusting that Dagny Taggart is a railroad vice-president.
- The Fishwife is one of the strikers, who earns her living by providing the fish for Hammond's grocery market; she is described as having "dark, disheveled hair and large eyes" and is a writer. Galt says she "wouldn't be published outside. She believes that when one deals with words, one deals with the mind." This character represents Rand herself; it is her cameo appearance in her own novel.
- Richard Halley is Dagny Taggart's favorite composer. He mysteriously disappeared after the evening of his greatest triumph. Halley spent years as a struggling and unappreciated composer. At age 24, his opera Phaethon was performed for the first time, to an audience who booed and heckled it. After 19 years, Phaethon was performed again, but this time it was received to the greatest ovation the opera house had ever heard. The following day, Halley retired, sold the rights to his music, and disappeared. It is later revealed that he has joined the strike and settled in Galt's Gulch.
- Lawrence Hammond runs Hammond Cars in Colorado, one of the few companies in existence that still produces top-quality vehicles. He eventually quits and joins the strike.
- Mrs. William Hastings is the widow of the chief engineer at the Twentieth Century Motor Company. Her husband quit shortly after Galt did and joined the strike some years later. Her lead allows Dagny to find Hugh Akston.
- Dr. Thomas Hendricks is a famous brain surgeon who developed a new method of preventing strokes. He joined Galt's strike when the American medical system was put under government control.
- Tinky Holloway is one of the "looters" and is frequently referred to and quoted by other characters in the story, but he has only one major appearance, during the Washington meeting with Hank Rearden.
- Lee Hunsacker is in charge of a company called Amalgamated Service that takes over the Twentieth Century Motor Company. He files a lawsuit that eventually leads Midas Mulligan and Judge Narragansett to join the strike. A failed businessman, he laments constantly that no one ever gave him a chance.
- Gwen Ives is Hank Rearden's secretary, described as being in her late twenties and remaining calm and professional despite the chaos that threatens his business. When Rearden abandons his mills and joins Galt's strike, she and many other employees do the same.
- Gilbert Keith-Worthing is a British novelist of erstwhile fame, now neglected but still considered a "walking classic," and a proponent of the idea that freedom is an illusion. Kip Chalmers brings him along on the train to California, "for no reason that either of them could discover"; he dies in the Taggart Tunnel disaster.
- Owen Kellogg is assistant to the manager of the Taggart Terminal in New York. He catches Dagny Taggart's eye as one of the few competent men on staff. After seeing the sorry state of the Ohio Division, she decides to make him its new superintendent. However, as soon as she returns to New York, Kellogg informs her that he is quitting his job. Owen Kellogg eventually reaches, and settles in, Galt's Gulch.
- Fred Kinnan is a labor leader and member of the looter cabal. Unlike the others, however, Kinnan is straightforward and honest about his purpose. Kinnan is the only one to openly state his and his fellow conspirators' true motivations. At the end of Galt's three-hour speech, he expresses admiration for the man, as he says what he means. Despite this, Kinnan admits that he is one of the people Galt is out to destroy.
- Paul Larkin is an unsuccessful, middle-aged businessman, a friend of the Rearden family. He meets with the other looters to work out a plan to bring Rearden down. James Taggart knows that he is a friend of Hank Rearden and challenges his loyalty; Larkin assures Taggart that he will go along with them.
- Eugene Lawson heads the Community Bank of Madison, then gets a job with the government when his bank goes bankrupt under new government policies. One of the looter's cabal, he is a collectivist who abhors production and money-making.
- Mort Liddy is a hack composer who writes trite scores for movies and modern symphonies to which no one listens. He believes melody is a primitive vulgarity. He is one of Lillian Rearden's friends and a member of the cultural elite.
- Clifton Locey is a friend of Jim Taggart who takes the position of vice-president of operations when Dagny Taggart quits.
- Pat Logan is the engineer on the first run of the John Galt Line. He later strikes.
- Kay Ludlow is a beautiful actress who quit Hollywood because of the roles she was given and secretly married the pirate Ragnar Danneskjöld.
- Roger Marsh is a producer of electrical equipment who joins the strike. Dagny finds him growing cabbage in Galt's Gulch.
- Dick McNamara is a contractor who finished the San Sebastián Line. Dagny Taggart plans to hire him to lay the new Rearden Metal track for the Rio Norte Line, but before she does so, he mysteriously disappears. She later discovers that he has joined the strike and settled in Galt's Gulch.
- Cuffy Meigs is the Director of Unification for the railroad business. He carries a pistol and a lucky rabbit's foot, dresses in a military uniform, and is described as "impervious to thought". Meigs seizes control of Project X and accidentally destroys it, demolishing the country's last railroad bridge across the Mississippi River and killing himself, his men, and Dr. Stadler.
- Dave Mitchum is a state-hired superintendent of the Colorado Division of Taggart Transcontinental. He is partially responsible for the Taggart Tunnel disaster.
- Chick Morrison holds the position of "morale conditioner" in the government. He quits when society begins to collapse and flees to a stronghold in Tennessee. His fellow looters consider it unlikely that he will survive.
- Horace Bussby Mowen is the president of the Amalgamated Switch and Signal Company, Inc., of Connecticut. He is a businessman who sees nothing wrong with the moral code that is destroying society and would never dream of saying he is in business for any reason other than the good of society. Dagny Taggart hires Mowen to produce switches made of Rearden Metal. He is reluctant to build anything with this unproven technology and has to be cajoled into accepting the contract. When pressured by public opinion, he discontinues production of the switches, forcing Dagny to find an alternative source.
- Midas Mulligan is a wealthy banker who mysteriously disappeared in protest after he was given a court order to lend money to an incompetent applicant. When the order came down, he liquidated his entire business, paid off his depositors, and joined Galt's strike. He is the legal owner of the land where Galt's Gulch is located. Mulligan's birth name was Michael, but he had it legally changed after a news article called him "Midas" in a derogatory fashion, which Mulligan took as a compliment.
- Judge Narragansett is an American jurist who ruled in favor of Midas Mulligan during the case brought against him by the incompetent loan applicant. When Narragansett's ruling was reversed on appeal, he retired and joined the strike. At the end of the novel, he is seen editing the United States Constitution, crossing out portions that contradict each other and adding an amendment to prohibit Congress from passing laws that restrain freedom of trade.
- Ben Nealy is a railroad contractor whom Dagny Taggart hires to replace the track on the Rio Norte Line with Rearden Metal. Nealy is incompetent, but Dagny can find no one better in all the country. Nealy believes that anything can get done with enough muscle power. He sees no role for intelligence in human achievement. He relies on Dagny and Ellis Wyatt to run things and resents them for doing it, because it appears to him that they are just bossing people around.
- Ted Nielsen is the head of Nielsen Motors. He eventually goes on strike, along with most of the other industrialist "producer" types, by closing his motor factory. Dagny later finds him when she visits Galt's Gulch for the first time.
- Betty Pope is a wealthy socialite who is having a meaningless sexual affair with James Taggart. She is deliberately crude in a way that casts ridicule on her high social position.
- Dr. Potter holds some undefined position with the State Science Institute. He is sent to try to obtain the rights to Rearden Metal.
- Dr. Simon Pritchett is the prestigious head of the Department of Philosophy at Patrick Henry University and is considered the leading philosopher of the age. He believes that man is nothing but a collection of chemicals, reason is a superstition, it is futile to seek meaning in life, and the duty of a philosopher is to show that nothing can be understood.
- Rearden's mother, whose name is not mentioned, lives with Rearden at his home in Philadelphia. She is involved in charity work and berates Rearden whenever she can. She dotes on her weak son Philip Rearden.
- Philip Rearden is the younger brother of Hank Rearden. He lives in his brother's home in Philadelphia and is completely dependent on him. He is resentful of his brother's charity.
- Dwight Sanders owns Sanders Aircraft, a producer of high-quality airplanes, and joins the strike.
- Bertram Scudder is an editorial writer for the magazine The Future. He typically bashes business and businessmen but he never says anything specific in his articles, relying on innuendo, sneers, and denunciation. He wrote a hatchet job on Hank Rearden called The Octopus. He is also vocal in support of the Equalization of Opportunity Bill. Scudder claims that the most important thing in life is "brother love" but seems to have nothing but hatred for those around him. He loses his job after Dagny Taggart reveals her affair with Hank Rearden over air on his radio show.
- Claude Slagenhop is president of the political organization Friends of Global Progress and one of Lillian Rearden's friends. He believes that ideas are just air and that this is no time for talk, but for action. Global Progress is a sponsor of the Equalization of Opportunity Bill.
- Gerald and Ivy Starnes are the two surviving children of Jed Starnes, the founder of the Twentieth Century Motor Company. Together with their since-deceased brother Eric, they instituted a communistic payment-and-benefits program that drove the company into bankruptcy. Gerald, a dying alcoholic, and Ivy, a pseudo-Buddhist ascetic, continue to insist that the plan was perfect and that the failure of their father's company was entirely due to the workers. Eric was a weak, attention-seeking man with a pathological desire to be loved. He committed suicide after the woman he loved married another man. Gerald claims that he always acted for the good of the employees, but he was vain and incompetent and often threw lavish parties using company funds. Ivy, on the other hand, is described as a sadist who relishes seeing others in poverty, but who has no desire for wealth of her own.
- Andrew Stockton runs the Stockton Foundry in Stockton, Colorado. When he joins the strike, he opens a foundry in Galt's Gulch.
- Mr. Thompson is the "head of the state" for the United States. He is not particularly intelligent and has a very undistinguished look. He knows politics, however, and is a master of public relations and back-room deals. Rand's notes indicate that she modeled him on President Harry S. Truman and that she deliberately decided not to call him "President of the United States" as this title has "honorable connotations" which the character does not deserve.
- Lester Tuck is the campaign manager for Kip Chalmers and one of his guests on the train trip to California. He dies in the Taggart Tunnel disaster.
- Clem Weatherby is a government representative on the board of directors of Taggart Transcontinental. Dagny considers him the least bad of the government representatives, since he does have some real knowledge of the running of trains. She notices, however, that he is the least appreciated by his own bosses.
- The Wet Nurse (Tony) is a young bureaucrat sent by the government to watch over Rearden's mills. Though he starts out as a cynical follower of the looters' code, his experience at the mills transforms him, and he comes to respect and admire the producers. He is shot attempting to inform Hank Rearden about a government plot, but does succeed in warning Rearden just before he dies.
- Ellis Wyatt is the head of Wyatt Oil. He has almost single-handedly revived the economy of Colorado by discovering a new process for extracting more oil from what were thought to be exhausted oil wells. When first introduced, he is aggressive towards Dagny, whom he does not yet know and whom he blames for what are, in fact, her brother's policies, which directly threaten his business. When the government passes laws and decrees that make it impossible for him to continue, he sets all of his oil wells on fire and disappears from public view, leaving a note: "I am leaving it as I found it. Take over. It's yours." One particular burning well that resists all efforts to extinguish it becomes known as "Wyatt's Torch". Later, Dagny meets him in Galt's Gulch.
