= Death Race =

Death Race may refer to:

== Death Race franchise ==
- Death Race (franchise)
  - Death Race 2000, a 1975 cult action film
  - Death Race (2008 film), a remake of Death Race 2000
  - Death Race 2, 2010 prequel to the 2008 film
  - Death Race 3: Inferno, 2013 film set between the 2008 and 2010 films
  - Death Race 2050, a 2017 sequel to Death Race 2000
  - Death Race: Beyond Anarchy, a 2018 sequel to the 2008 film

== Comics ==
- Deathrace, a Ghost Rider anthology from the Marvel Epic Collection

== Film and television ==
- Death Race (1973 film), 1973 World War II film
- Death Race, a limited show based on fictional vehicles racing from Rooster Teeth#ScrewAttack/Death Battle

== Music ==
- Death Race, an album with a song of the same name by Magnetico
- "Deathrace", a song from Razor's Executioner's Song (album)
- "Deathrace", a song from Manifesto (Deadlock album)

== Video games ==
- Death Race (1976 video game), a 1976 video game
- Death Race (1990 video game), a remake of the 1976 game

== See also ==
- Canadian Death Race, an annual adventure race
- Death Racers, a 2008 action film
- Fast and Fierce: Death Race, a mockbuster from The Asylum
- Deathrace King, a 2000 album by The Crown
- Death Race for Love, a 2019 album by American rapper Juice Wrld
- "A Race Against Death", an episode of the Doctor Who series The Sensorites
- Deathray (disambiguation)
