= Death Race (1990 video game) =

- Cover art
- Publisher(s): American Game Cartridges
- Programmer(s): James M. Ferguson; Keith Rupp; John Dunn; Donald Forbes; Scott Schryver
- Composer(s): David Wood; Donald Forbes
- Platform(s): NES
- Release: NA: 1990
- Genre(s): Vehicular combat
- Mode(s): Single-player, multiplayer

Death Race is a vehicular combat video game developed by American Game Cartridges for the Nintendo Entertainment System (NES), and published in 1990. It is a remake of a 1976 video game of the same name.

Death Race is one of three games that American Game Cartridges published for the NES. The others are Shockwave and a conversion of the 1986 light gun arcade game Chiller. They released all their titles in 1990. In Australia the game was distributed by Home Entertainment Suppliers, and was only available to members of their "HES Game Club".

Nintendo Player described Death Race as the "spiritual predecessor" of the Grand Theft Auto game series developed by DMA Design, which applies major gameplay elements from Death Race. BMG Interactive published the first Grand Theft Auto game in 1997.

== Gameplay ==
Death Race is set in eight American cities, which the player visits in succession: San Diego, California; Phoenix, Arizona; Denver, Colorado; Houston, Texas; New Orleans, Louisiana; Chicago, Illinois; Raleigh, North Carolina; and New York, New York.

In each city, the player drives an armored sports car equipped with surface-to-air missiles and rapid-fire guns. Player performance is measured by the number of kills. The player may use money earned in the game to upgrade the car's engine, tires, chassis, guns, and missiles. Level completion requires capturing one to four flags, and then passing through the exit. The game has four difficulty levels: Rookie, Amateur, Professional, and World Class. To complete the game, the player must play through all cities twice at the "World Class" difficulty setting.

Compared to the 1976 arcade game, the city has improved graphics, and the tombstones that can block the player's path have been replaced with enemies on helicopters.
