= Shockwave (video game) =

1990 video game

- Cover art
- Developer: American Game Cartridges
- Publisher: American Game Cartridges
- Designers: James M. Ferguson; David Wood; John Dunn
- Composers: David Wood; Donald Forbes
- Platform: Nintendo Entertainment System
- Release: NA: 1990
- Genre: Puzzle
- Modes: Single-player, multiplayer

Shockwave is an unlicensed 1990 puzzle game for the Nintendo Entertainment System developed and published by American Game Cartridges.

== Gameplay ==
The object of the game is to collect all of the crystals left behind by the extinct alien race, the Tarians.

The game asks the player to input their name. The game uses a three-character password system that is influenced by the name the player chose at the beginning of the game. The game can also be played by two players, but there is only an alternative mode.

All the crystals in the level must be retrieved under a strict time limit that simulates the space suit getting weaker and eventually running out of strength. Once the space suit has been destroyed, the player is killed and loses a life.

The enemies are fireballs, which bounce around in the stage.

The player's weapon can destroy cracked blocks, but it can also create a shockwave in solid blocks, pushing the last block in a line of adjacent blocks.

Bonus items such as hourglasses, extra lives or enemy freezers can be collected.

The game has a total of 50 levels.

== Release ==
Shockwave was the last game officially released by American Game Cartridges before the bankruptcy of the company, even though their last game, Wally Bear and the NO! Gang, was released by American Video Entertainment, another unlicensed company, which was a subsidiary of the computer chip manufacturer Macronix. Wally Bear includes in-game advertising for Shockwave.

== Reception ==
AllGame gave Shockwave a score of 2.5 stars out of a possible 5.
