= Double strike =

Double strike or double struck may refer to:

- A double struck coin, which occurs when a coin is struck twice in the minting process.
- Double striking, or typing a character over itself on a typewriter as a way to make it darker (or by accident).
- Blackboard bold, whose characters are sometimes called double-struck, a typeface style imitating the chalk writing used for mathematical symbols such as $\mathbb{N},$ $\mathbb{Z},$ $\mathbb{Q},$ and $\mathbb{R},$ which can be approximated on a typewriter by double striking the letters with a horizontal offset.
- 2023 Hollywood labor disputes, nicknamed the "Hollywood double strike" after the actors' guild declared a labor strike in July of that year, joining the writers' guilds who had gone on strike in May.
- Double Strike, a 1989 video game developed and published in Taiwan by Sachen.
- In bowling, strikes on two consecutive rolls.

== See also ==
- Double stroke, in drumming, a rudiment consisting of alternating diddles of indeterminate speed and length
