= Jerry Macaluso =

American film producer

- Born: July 12, 1967 (age 58); Connecticut, Hartford, United States
- Notable work: SOTA FX; SOTA Toys; Pop Culture Shock Collectibles

Gerald "Jerry" Macaluso (born July 12, 1967) is an American toy designer, sculptor, film producer, and entrepreneur.

== Early career ==
Jerry Macaluso was born in Hartford, Connecticut and is the eldest of four siblings. At the age of 17, Macaluso entered the field of special effects makeup assisting Norman Cabrera on the set of the horror film Scarecrows. A year later he became the special makeup designer on the film The Unholy. Shortly thereafter, Macaluso was hired to re-create Toxie for The Toxic Avenger Part II, Troma's sequel to the cult classic The Toxic Avenger. By 1990, Macaluso moved to Los Angeles, California and formed SOTA FX with partner Roy Knyrim. The next several years were spent creating effects for such films as Darkman, The Indian in the Cupboard, Spawn, the Weird Science television series and Gods and Monsters. In the late 1990s, Macaluso formed a toy development company called SOTA Sculpture and Design which designed and created action figure prototypes for Hasbro, Mattel, Toy Biz, ReSaurus and Palisades Toys, among others.

== SOTA Toys and Plastic Fantasy ==
In 2000, Macaluso started a new company called Plastic Fantasy. Plastic Fantasy designed and manufactured action figures of porn stars including Jenna Jameson, Brianna Banks, Christy Canyon and Asia Carrera. The company's products have been featured on The Tonight Show, Nightline and Newsweek. In 2006, Macaluso sold Plastic Fantasy.

Following the success of Plastic Fantasy, Macaluso formed SOTA Toys in 2001 to manufacture action figures and collectibles based on such properties as Capcom's fighting game series Street Fighter, the Universal film The Chronicles of Riddick, Blizzard Entertainment's World of Warcraft and music legend Johnny Cash. SOTA Toy's horror themed line, Now Playing, featuring characters from such iconic films as The Thing, Darkman, Tremors, Saw and Dog Soldiers.

== Filmmaking ==
In 2005, Macaluso began producing horror films under the Karza Productions and Centuri Films labels. The first film, Night Skies, is based on the true story of six travellers in Phoenix, Arizona who are terrorized by an unknown creature during the night of the Phoenix Lights incident on March 13, 1997.

== Pop Culture Shock Collectibles ==
In 2008, a new company, Pop Culture Shock Collectibles, Inc., was formed. This company made high-end polystone statues and collectibles based on popular pop culture properties such as Mortal Kombat, Street Fighter, ThunderCats, Power Rangers, Judge Dredd, and He-Man and The Masters of The Universe. In the summer of 2017, Macaluso sold Pop Culture Shock Collectibles, and the company relocated to North Carolina.

== Television ==
In January, 2012, Macaluso, was a contestant on the second season of the SyFy special effects competition reality show Face Off, where he placed 7th.
