= Demons at the Door =

2004 American horror film

- DVD cover
- Directed by: Roy Knyrim
- Written by: Patrick Tantalo
- Produced by: Eric Miller; Melissa Strickland
- Starring: Rick Benedetto; Leslie Brockett; Sean'e La'Dae; Bob Cicherillo; Richard Elfman; Angelo Benedetto
- Cinematography: Bradley Traver
- Edited by: Richard Elias; Roy Knyrim; Patrick Tantalo
- Music by: Patrick Tantalo
- Production companies: Pan Productions; S.O.T.A. Productions
- Distributed by: Amsell Entertainment; Maverick Entertainment Group
- Release date: 2004
- Running time: 85 minutes
- Country: United States
- Language: English

Demons at the Door is a 2004 American supernatural horror film directed by Roy Knyrim. It stars Rick Benedetto, Leslie Brockett, Sean'e La'Dae, Bob Cicherillo, Richard Elfman (under the pseudonym "Aristide Sumatra"), and Angelo Benedetto. Featuring music by the American hip hop duo Insane Clown Posse, the film was released direct-to-video.

== Plot ==
The film depicts a character named The Duke killing racist demons, making one-liners, and becoming the leader of hell.

== Cast ==
- Rick Benedetto as Sgt. Rick Castellano
- Leslie Brockett as Annie Scara
- Sean'e La'Dae as Rudy Ray Jackson
- Bob Cicherillo as Uriel
- Richard Elfman as Monkey Demon (credited as Aristide Sumatra)
- Angelo Benedetto as Dr. Angelo Scara

== Reception ==
Richard Propes of The Independent Critic said, "There are so many things wrong with this film":

First, we have a white guy playing an Islamic terrorist...we have the horrid Darth Vader voiceovers. We have the absolute worst CGI ever (If it is, in fact, CGI). We have Demons that resemble early Godzilla replicas. We have the most remarkably inept acting I've seen in quite some time. Literally, and I can hardly ever say this about a film...there is not one good performance in this film...not a spark, not a hint of talent anywhere.
