= Cemetery Gates =

Cemetery gates are the entrance gates to a cemetery. Cemetery gates may also refer to

- "Cemetry Gates", a 1986 song by the British rock band The Smiths
- "Cemetery Gates (Pantera song)", a 1990 song by American heavy metal band Pantera
- Cemetery Gates (film), a 2006 American horror film
