= Unforgettable (2017 film) =

2017 film directed by Denise Di Novi

- Theatrical release poster
- Directed by: Denise Di Novi
- Written by: Christina Hodson
- Produced by: Denise Di Novi; Alison Greenspan; Ravi D. Mehta
- Starring: Katherine Heigl; Rosario Dawson; Geoff Stults
- Cinematography: Caleb Deschanel
- Edited by: Frédéric Thoraval
- Music by: Toby Chu
- Production company: Di Novi Pictures
- Distributed by: Warner Bros. Pictures
- Release date: April 21, 2017 (United States)
- Running time: 100 minutes
- Country: United States
- Language: English
- Budget: $12–21.5 million
- Box office: $17.8 million

Unforgettable is a 2017 American drama thriller film directed by Denise Di Novi (in her feature directorial debut) and written by Christina Hodson. The film stars Rosario Dawson, Katherine Heigl, Geoff Stults, Isabella Rice, and Cheryl Ladd, and follows a divorcée who begins to torment her ex-husband's new fiancée.

Principal photography began on August 17, 2015, in Los Angeles. The film was released on April 21, 2017, by Warner Bros. Pictures. The film, which received mostly negative reviews, grossed $17 million worldwide against its $12–21.5 million budget.

== Plot ==
Julia Banks is questioned by police after the body of her abusive ex-boyfriend Michael Vargas is found in her home. Despite Julia's restraining order against him, Detective Pope reveals intimate messages and photos from her on Michael's phone, along with her underwear found in his car.

Six months earlier, Julia moves in with her fiancé David Connover and his daughter Lily, and struggles with the constant presence of Tessa, David's ex-wife and Lily's mother. Controlling and obsessive, Tessa is not coping with the end of her marriage, exacerbated by her equally cold and demanding mother, Helen (nicknamed "Lovey"). Stealing Julia's phone, Tessa accesses her private photos and information, including her recently expired restraining order. She sets up a Facebook account posing as Julia, using it to reach out to Michael. She also steals David's watch, Julia's engagement ring, and a pair of her panties, sending the watch and panties to Michael.

Determined to remove Julia from her life, Tessa anonymously sends her flowers, making David suspect Julia is having an affair. Lily wanders away from Julia at a farmer's market into the arms of Tessa, who lies to make Julia seem unfit to watch her daughter. At riding practice, Tessa tries to force a frightened Lily to ride a new, larger horse, but Julia takes Lily home, humiliating Tessa in front of Lovey.

Tessa cuts Lily's long hair as punishment, leading to a heated argument with Julia. As David arrives home, Tessa throws herself down the stairs, pretending Julia pushed her. David assures Julia that he loves her, but refuses to see the truth about his ex.

Julia and her friend Ali discover police records of Tessa's obsessive and violent tendencies as a child, which led her to burn down her father's home. As “Julia”, Tessa enjoys sexually explicit messages with Michael, inviting him to visit Julia for sex. Finding the real Julia alone at home, he attacks her, but a badly beaten Julia wounds him with a kitchen knife and escapes. Tessa, waiting outside, stabs Michael in the chest, framing Julia for his murder. Julia is released after being questioned by Detective Pope, who shows David the social media conversations with Michael.

At Tessa's home, David notices her burned gloves in the fireplace and the stolen ring on her finger. He realizes the whole truth, but an enraged Tessa knocks him unconscious with a fireplace poker, and ties him up. Julia arrives, taking Lily to her car, and returns to rescue David but is attacked by Tessa.

In the ensuing fight, Tessa is halted by the sight of her bleeding face in a mirror, and by a picture of Lily. As Julia holds her at bay with a knife, Tessa commits suicide by pulling herself onto the blade; dying, she asks Julia not to let Lily remember her like this.

Six months later, David and Julia have married and moved into a new house with Lily far from his home town, in San Francisco. Julia is horrified by the arrival of Lovey, asking to see her granddaughter.

== Cast ==
- Rosario Dawson as Julia Banks, David's fiancée
- Katherine Heigl as Tessa Connover, David's ex-wife
- Geoff Stults as David Connover, Tessa's ex-husband and Lily's father
- Cheryl Ladd as Helen/"Lovey", Tessa's mother
- Sarah Burns as Sarah, David's friend since childhood
- Whitney Cummings as Ali, Julia's best friend
- Simon Kassianides as Michael Vargas, Julia's abusive and violent ex-boyfriend
- Isabella Kai Rice as Lily Connover, Tessa and David's daughter
- Robert Ray Wisdom as Detective Pope
- Jayson Blair as Jason

== Production ==
On January 9, 2014, it was announced that Warner Bros. had hired Amma Asante to direct the female-centric thriller Unforgettable. Denise Di Novi was set to produce the film along with Alison Greenspan, while Christina Hodson was writing the script. On December 2, 2014, Kate Hudson and Kerry Washington were cast as the leads in the film, about a man who is threatened by his ex-wife. On June 22, 2015, after director Asante and actresses Hudson and Washington had left the project, it was revealed that producer Di Novi would make her directorial debut with the film. It was also revealed that David Leslie Johnson had co-written the script along with Hodson, though only Hodson is credited on the final film.

On August 12, 2015, Katherine Heigl was cast to play Tessa Connover, the sly and mentally unstable divorced mother who threatens her ex-husband, daughter, and her ex-husband's new girlfriend. The same day, Rosario Dawson was cast as the girlfriend, Julia Banks, who tries to fight back against Tessa. On August 21, 2015, additional cast members were announced, including Geoff Stults as David, the ex-husband, Isabella Rice as Lily, the daughter, Cheryl Ladd as Heigl's character's mother, and Simon Kassianides, Whitney Cummings, and Robert Wisdom.

Ravi D. Mehta and Emanuel Michael were also announced as producers of the film, along with other members of the creative team, including cinematographer Caleb Deschanel, production designer Nelson Coates, editor Frédéric Thoraval, and costume designer Marian Toy.

=== Filming ===
Principal photography on the film began on August 17, 2015, in and around Los Angeles.

== Release ==
Unforgettable was released on April 21, 2017, by Warner Bros. Pictures.

=== Box office ===
Unforgettable grossed $11.4 million in the United States and Canada and $6.4 million in other territories for a worldwide gross of $17.8 million. There were different estimates of the budget; the Los Angeles Times reported the film had a production budget of $12 million, while the California Film Commission listed the film as spending $26.9 million on location, for a net budget of $21.5 million after tax rebates.

In the United States and Canada, Unforgettable opened alongside The Promise, Born in China, Free Fire, and Phoenix Forgotten, and was initially projected to gross around $7 million from 2,417 theaters in its opening weekend. However, after grossing just $1.7 million on Friday, weekend projections were lowered to $4–5 million. It ended up opening to $4.8 million, finishing 7th at the box office.

=== Critical response ===
On Rotten Tomatoes, the film has an approval rating of 29% based on 120 reviews, with an average rating of 4.00/10. The site's critical consensus reads, "Unforgettable's talented cast makes this domestic thriller consistently watchable, even if its failure to fully embrace its premise's campy possibilities prevents it from living up to its title." On Metacritic, the film has a score of 45 out of 100, based on 27 critics, indicating "mixed or average reviews". Audiences polled by CinemaScore gave the film an average grade of "C" on an A+ to F scale.

Vince Mancini of Uproxx called the film "a surprisingly well-executed version of exactly what you assumed it would be. Which is to say, it’s a 'psycho ex' movie that’s fun, but doesn’t exactly reinvent the genre...It’s fun while it lasts, let’s say (the opposite of its title, basically). Sometimes that’s enough, but your mileage may vary." Simran Hans of The Observer gave it 3/5 stars, writing: "This is deliberately silly and knowing satire and I hope it becomes a camp classic." Peter Bradshaw of The Guardian also gave the film 3/5 stars, calling it "a cheerfully outrageous gloss-trash erotic noir in the style that legendary screenwriter Joe Eszterhas used to crank out so lucratively in the 80s and 90s".

Ed Potton of The Times gave it 1/5 stars, writing: "If this were a spoof, it would be a work of genius. Sadly, it's played straight, a glossy melodrama-cum-thriller of staggering cheesiness and unintentional hilarity." Tim Robey of The Daily Telegraph said that the film was "the sort of psychothriller that comes back in ever tattier incarnations, like a wind-tossed scarecrow whose limbs keep falling off", and also gave it 1/5 stars. Neil Genzlinger of The New York Times wrote: "It's woman in jeopardy meets woman on the verge, a reductive brand of thriller from another decade, freshened here only with the addition of a plot element involving Facebook."
