= Peek-A-Boo Poker =

- North American cover art
- Developer(s): Idea-Tek
- Publisher(s): Hacker International/Panesian
- Platform(s): NES
- Release: NA: 1991; AU: 1990
- Genre(s): Adult
- Mode(s): Single-player

Peek-A-Boo Poker (Chinese: 撲克精靈; pinyin: Pūkè Jīnglíng; lit. 'Poker Wizard'), is a video game made by the company Idea-Tek and distributed by Hacker International/Panesian in 1991 as one of their three pornographic video games for NES, the other two being Magic Bubble and Hot Slots.

== Summary ==
One of only a few adult video games for the Nintendo Entertainment System, the distribution was limited as major national chains would not carry the items for sale.

The gameplay consists of a simple strip poker simulator in which the player can see a different reward screen, consisting of an erotic image of a woman, for every $1000 they collect in winnings, to a maximum of $5000. The game uses standard five-card draw poker rules. There are three computer controlled players: Full House Francine, Double Dealing Debby, and Pok-er Penny.

== See also ==
- Magic Bubble (1991)
- Hot Slots (1991)
