= Gwendoline Yeo =

Singaporean actress (born 1977)

- 杨时贤
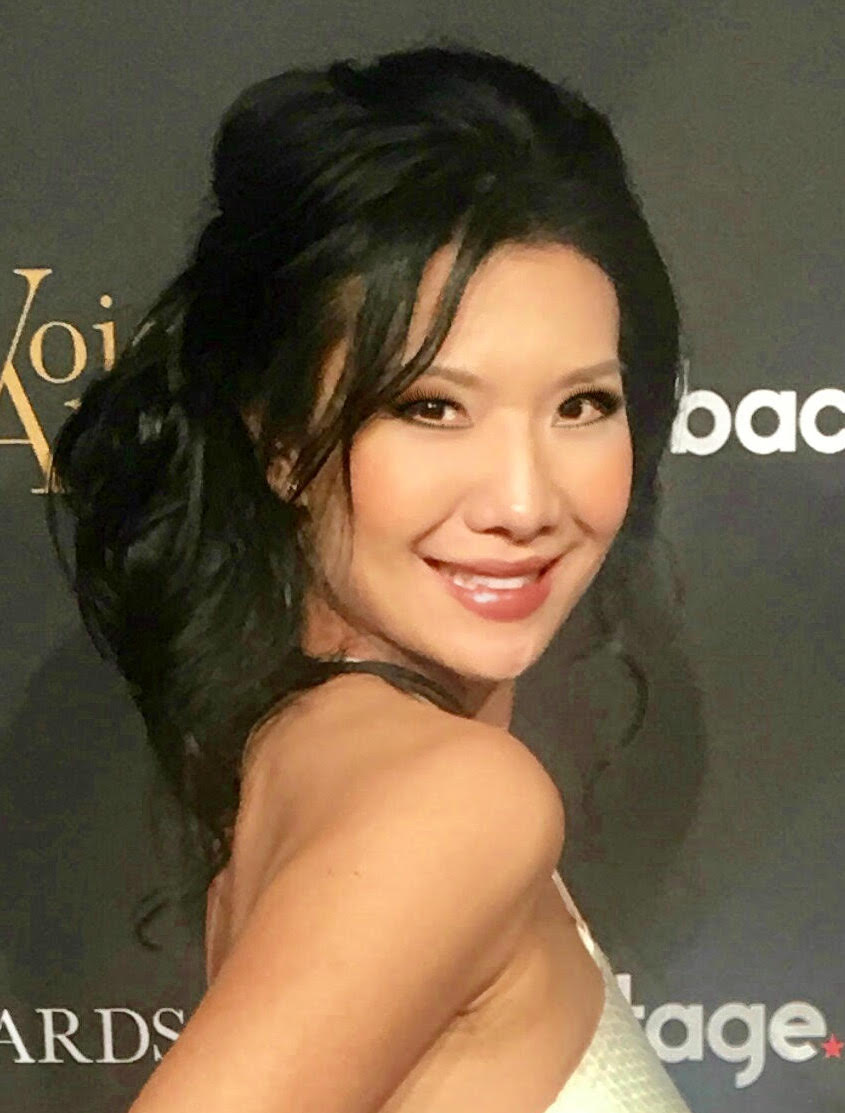
- Yeo in 2018
- Born: Gwendoline See-Hian Yeo; 10 July 1977 (age 49); Singapore
- Education: University of California, Los Angeles (BA); San Francisco Conservatory of Music
- Occupation: Actress
- Years active: 2001–present
- Relatives: George Yeo (uncle)
- Website: www.gwendolineyeo.com

Gwendoline See-Hian Yeo (Chinese: 杨时贤; pinyin: Yáng Shíxián; born 10 July 1977) is an actress based in the United States. Born in Singapore, she moved to California in 1988 and began acting in sitcoms such as Grounded for Life and The Random Years. Yeo is known for her roles as Dr. Kelly Lee on General Hospital, Xiao-Mei on Desperate Housewives, and Sun Fu in Broken Trail. She is also known for voicing different roles in voiceover projects.

== Early life ==
Born in Singapore, Yeo moved to California, United States when she was eleven, where she attended St. Ignatius College Preparatory before graduating with honors in 1994. Yeo graduated summa cum laude from the University of California, Los Angeles, in 1997. She also completed a diploma in classical piano at the San Francisco Conservatory of Music.

Yeo was crowned Miss Asian America in 1995 and was also named Miss Chinatown USA in 1998–99.

She is the niece of George Yeo, a Singaporean former politician who served as Minister for Foreign Affairs between 2004 and 2011.

== Career ==
=== Film ===
Yeo starred opposite Robert Duvall and Thomas Haden Church in the Emmy Award-winning Western Broken Trail as Sun Fu (also known as "Number Three"), a Chinese woman sold into prostitution in the 1800s. After a worldwide search, Duvall personally selected her to star opposite him in the role. Her performance in the film earned her critical acclaim and a NAMIC Vision Award nomination for Best Actress in 2007.

In the independent film Heathens and Thieves, Yeo played Kun Hua, a role which garnered her Best Actress Awards at both the WorldFest Houston International Film Festival and the Iowa Film Festival.

Yeo also starred in the Emmy Award-nominated Amazon original special American Girl: Ivy & Julie.

Other notable film roles include Dr. Samantha Yep in The Jane Austen Book Club with Emily Blunt and Hugh Dancy, June in Night Skies, and The Magic of Ordinary Days with Keri Russell.

=== Television ===
Yeo is known for her recurring guest star role as Xiao-Mei, the Chinese maid of Gabrielle Solis (Eva Longoria) and Carlos Solis (Ricardo Antonio Chavira) in Desperate Housewives. The character's popularity in the series led to an offer for a series regular contract the next season.

Set to debut in the 2020–21 television season, Yeo was cast as a series regular on The CW's Kung Fu as Zhilan, a dangerous nemesis with criminal ties and a connection to the Shaolin monastery. Before the series aired, Yeo was replaced by Yvonne Chapman.

She also had a recurring role as the Oklahoma-born Sargent Richelle (opposite Felicity Huffman) in the critically acclaimed series American Crime, played Kelly Lee on General Hospital, and has also guested on other popular shows such as NCIS, Grey's Anatomy, Castle, The Mentalist, and Chuck.

=== Voice acting ===
Yeo is a prominent voice artist in several animated series, films, video games, and commercials, and has multiple action figures based on her characters. She started her career in voice-over in 2003 with guest role on What's New, Scooby-Doo?. More recently, she voiced Lady Shiva in the 2019 animated series Young Justice, and Tsiao Jung in the 2019 Emmy Award-winning series Love, Death & Robots.

Her character Shinigami, from Nickelodeon's Teenage Mutant Ninja Turtles, was officially launched during San Diego Comic-Con to a huge crowd of fans. In 2020, she voiced another iconic role from the TMNT universe, Karai, in Nickelodeon's Rise of the Teenage Mutant Ninja Turtles.

She has voiced several other popular animated characters including Nala Se, Jedi Kalifa, and Cato Parassiti in Star Wars: The Clone Wars, Domino and Master Mold in Wolverine and the X-Men, Mariko Yashida in Marvel Anime: Wolverine, Dr. Yui Sasaki in Marvel Anime: X-Men, Li Mei in The Invincible Iron Man, Lola Chang in Batman: The Dark Knight Returns, Gramma on Stitch!, Mercy Graves in The Batman, Kitsune in Hellboy: Sword of Storms, and Li-en in Zatch Bell!. She has also guest starred in Phineas and Ferb, Kim Possible, Curious George, Yasuke, Ben 10: Omniverse, and Star Wars: Tales of the Underground.

In video games, Yeo is best known as Paine in Final Fantasy X-2 and Kingdom Hearts II. She was also the female lead in SOCOM 4 U.S. Navy SEALs as the character Forty-Five. Other notable video game credits include Lady Deathstrike in X-Men: Next Dimension, Yuma in Far Cry 4, and Four-Eyes in Resident Evil: Operation Raccoon City.

== Other projects ==
Yeo's love of music led her to specialize in playing the Chinese long zither, also known as the guzheng, which culminated into a one-woman radio show on NPR-KCRW about her immigrant and ugly duckling story. It also included the debut of her first two zither/vocal tracks "Kiss My Grits" and "Lovers."

Her radio show evolved into a theater piece which Yeo wrote, scored, and starred in called Laughing With My Mouth Wide Open, which received rave reviews during its run at the El Centro Theatre.

Yeo also designed her own limited-edition clothing line, which quickly sold out, and donated the proceeds to Kentucky's Christian Appalachian Project.

== Filmography ==
=== Live-action ===
==== Film ====
Year	Title	Role	Notes
2004	A Day Without a Mexican	Newscaster	
2007	Night Skies	June	
2007	Dead Tone	Detective Anne Hastings	
2007	The Jane Austen Book Club	Dr. Samantha Yep	
2008	Vacancy 2: The First Cut	Bride	
2012	Freeloaders	Yue Jie	

==== Television ====
Year	Title	Role	Notes
2001	Grounded for Life	Linda	2 episodes
2002	The Random Years	Happy Dragon Hot Waitress	Episode: "Don't Make Me Have Sex in the Hamptons"
2003	Watching Ellie	Andrea Barlow	Episode: "Shrink"
2004	The O.C.	Sara / Amy	Episode: "The Strip"
2004	Judging Amy	Lisa Bart	Episode: "Consent"
2005	The Magic of Ordinary Days	Rose	Television film
2005	NYPD Blue	Ai Watanabe	Episode: "Moving Day"
2005	JAG	Lt. Chang	Episode: "Unknown Soldier"
2005	24	Melissa Rabb	2 episodes
2006	General Hospital	Dr. Kelly Lee	7 episodes
2006	Desperate Housewives	Xiao-Mei	9 episodes
2006	Broken Trail	Sun Fu	Television film
2006	Hannah Montana	Bree Samuels	Episode: "New Kid in School"
2007	Standoff	Ratana Sadka	Episode: "No Strings"
2007	The 1/2 Hour News Hour	Yujira Shinato	1 episode
2007	Chuck	Mei-Ling Cho	Episode: "Chuck Versus the Sizzling Shrimp"
2008	Eli Stone	Joanna Kim	Episode: "Unwritten"
2008	The Mentalist	Alexandra	Episode: "Red-Handed"
2009	The Beast	Jennifer Ling	Episode: "The Walk In"
2011	Gigantic	Val	2 episodes
2015	Castle	Elise Kim	Episode: "The Wrong Stuff"
2015	American Crime	Richelle	4 episodes
2016	Grey's Anatomy	Michelle Carpio	Episode: "Mama Tried"
2017	Switched at Birth	Ling	Episode: "The Call"
2017	Criminal Minds: Beyond Borders	Lin Huang	Episode: "Cinderella and the Dragon"
2017	Wisdom of the Crowd	Deputy Chief Elaine Wu	Episode: "User Bias"
2018	NCIS	NCIS Special Agent Joanna Wright	Episode: "Death From Above"
2023	Truth Be Told	Social Worker	3 episodes

=== Voice acting ===
==== Film ====
Year	Title	Role	Notes
2007	The Invincible Iron Man	Li Mei	Direct-to-video
2011	Dead Space: Aftermath	Isabel Cho	Direct-to-video
2011	Green Lantern: Emerald Knights	Blu	Direct-to-video
2011	Scooby-Doo! Legend of the Phantosaur	Ms. Deitch	Direct-to-video
2012	Back to the Sea	Waitress	
2012	Batman: The Dark Knight Returns, Part One	Lola Chang	Direct-to-video
2013	Batman: The Dark Knight Returns, Part Two	Lola Chang	Direct-to-video
2015	Curious George 3: Back to the Jungle	Popcorn Vendor, Automated Voice	
2018	Charming	Maiden	Netflix film
2022	Animal Attraction	Marcy	Direct-to-video
2026	Steps (film)	Li Mei	Netflix film

==== Television ====
Year	Title	Role	Notes
2003	What's New, Scooby Doo?	Lt. Keiko Tanaka	Episode: "Big Appetite in Little Tokyo"
2005	Higglytown Heroes	Dentist Hero	Episode: "Kip's Sweet Tooth/Wayne's Lollipop"
2005–06	Zatch Bell!	Li-en	English dub 3 episodes
2006	The Life and Times of Juniper Lee	Cousin Lisa, Aunt Lily	Episode: "Party Monsters"
2006	Hellboy: Sword of Storms	Kitsune	Television film
2007	Kim Possible	Hoodie	2 episodes
2007	The Batman	Mercy Graves	Episode: "The Batman/Superman Story"
2008–09	Wolverine and the X-Men	Domino, Master Mold, Madeline Drake, Mariko Yashida	11 episodes
2008	Phineas and Ferb	Fifi	Episode: "Leave the Busting to Us!"
2008–20	Star Wars: The Clone Wars	Nala Se, Kalifa	9 episodes
2009	Special Agent Oso	Jack's Mother	Episode: "Octo-Puzzle/One Suitcase Is Not Enough"
2009–13	Stitch!	Gramma (Obaa), Adult Lilo Pelekai	English dub 11 episodes
2011	Marvel Anime: Wolverine	Mariko Yashida	English dub 4 episodes
2011	Marvel Anime: X-Men	Dr. Yui Sasaki	English dub 7 episodes
2012	Days of Our Lives	Female Movie Voice	3 episodes
2013–14	Ben 10: Omniverse	Nyancy Chan, Sheelane	3 episodes
2014	Two and a Half Men	Computer	Episode: "Alan Shot a Little Girl"
2015	Star vs. the Forces of Evil	Mrs. Liao	Episode: "Fortune Cookies"
2015	Be Cool, Scooby-Doo!	Dr. Lang	Episode: "Be Quiet Scooby-Doo!"
2015	Regular Show	Mary, Girl #2, Waitress #2	Episode: "Hello China"
2016–17	Teenage Mutant Ninja Turtles	Shinigami	6 episodes
2019–21	Young Justice	Lady Shiva, Rictus	5 episodes
2019	Love, Death & Robots	Tsiao Jung	Episode: "Good Hunting"
2019	Star Wars Resistance	Stormtrooper #2	Episode: "Break Out"
2020, 2025	American Dad!	Chinese Scientist, Jane	2 episodes
2020	Rise of the Teenage Mutant Ninja Turtles	Hamato Karai	2 episodes
2020	Curious George	Dr. Chu	1 episode
2020–2024	Lego Monkie Kid	Princess Iron Fan	7 episodes
2021	Yasuke	Ichika	English dub 5 episodes
2021–2024	Star Wars: The Bad Batch	Nala Se, Onedron Fighter	12 episodes
2022	Big City Greens	Masseuse	Episode: "Little Buddy/Zen Garden"
2025	Star Wars: Tales of the Underworld	Mayor	Episode: "One Good Deed"
2025	Disney's How NOT to Draw	Phineas and Ferb's animator (Jill)	Episode: "Phineas and Ferb"

==== Video games ====
Year	Title	Role	Ref
2002	X-Men: Next Dimension	Lady Deathstrike	
2003	X2: Wolverine's Revenge	Lady Deathstrike	
2003	Final Fantasy X-2	Paine	
2004	Seven Samurai 20XX	Cue	
2004	Baldur's Gate: Dark Alliance II	Luvia Bloodmire	
2004	Shellshock: Nam '67	Hooker #1	
2005	God of War	Lysandra, Civilians	
2005	Brave: The Search for Spirit Dancer	Maiden Rock, Villager	
2005	Zatch Bell! Mamodo Battles	Li-en	
2005	Kingdom of Paradise	Li Yin, Suzuka Disciple	
2005	Neopets: The Darkest Faerie	Spite	
2006	Kingdom Hearts II	Paine	
2006	Avatar: The Last Airbender	The Maker	
2006	Titan Quest	Additional voices	
2006	Zatch Bell! Mamodo Fury	Li-en	
2007	Brave: The Search for Spirit Dancer	Maiden Rock, Villagers	
2007	Syphon Filter: Logan's Shadow	Trinidad	
2007	Mass Effect	Sha'ira, Shiala	
2009	Uncharted 2: Among Thieves	Rika Raja	
2010	Mass Effect 2	Shiala, Captain Wasea, Kian Louros, Quarian Patron	
2010	God of War III	Lysandra	
2011	SOCOM 4: U.S. Navy SEALs	Lieutenant "Forty-Five" Park	
2011	Uncharted 3: Drake's Deception	Rika Raja	
2011	Saints Row: The Third	Pedestrians	
2012	Resident Evil: Operation Raccoon City	Four-Eyes	
2013	BioShock Infinite	Additional voices	
2013	Fuse	Meilin Mao	
2013	The Last of Us	Additional voices	
2013	Deadpool	Domino	
2013	Infinity Blade III	Lelindre	
2014	Far Cry 4	Yuma	
2015	Call of Duty: Black Ops III	Additional voices	
2016	Lego Marvel's Avengers	Crystal	
2016	Lego Star Wars: The Force Awakens	Additional voices	
2020	Disintegration	Alex (Female)	
2020	Iron Man VR	S.H.I.E.L.D. Agent, Terrified Businesswoman	
2020	Ghost of Tsushima	Additional voices	
2021	Lost Judgment	Yui Mamiya	
2022	Ghostwire: Tokyo	Woman E	
2022	Saints Row	Santo Ileso Pedestrians	
2022	Call of Duty: Modern Warfare II	Tse "Luna" Mingzhu	
2023	Teenage Mutant Ninja Turtles: Splintered Fate	Karai	
2023	Diablo IV	Additional voices	
2024	Final Fantasy VII Rebirth	Additional voices	
2026	Teenage Mutant Ninja Turtles: Empire City	Karai	
