= Alison Greenspan =

American film and television producer (1972–2021)

- Born: December 2, 1972
- Died: June 27, 2021 (aged 48)
- Occupations: Film and television producer
- Notable work: If I Stay; The Lucky One

Alison Sheryl Greenspan (December 2, 1972 – June 27, 2021) was an American film and television producer.

Alison Greenspan spent her childhood in Virginia and Boca Raton, Florida with her mother Ann, father Stephen and sister Melissa. Later she studied American History and Political Science at the University of Pennsylvania and graduated summa cum laude in 1994. In earlier years, Greenspan was a member of at Denise Di Novi's production company and later on president of Di Novi Pictures. Greenspan had been a partner at Doug Robinson Productions for the past several years.

In 2004, her father, Stephen Greenspan, former vice president of data carrier manufacturer Seagate Technology, became ill with ALS. In 2009, he died of this disease, as did her aunt Marylin in 2011. That is why she had the idea for a film about ALS, which was later realized under the title You're Not You. The film is dedicated to her father.

== Death ==
Greenspan died on June 27, 2021, from cancer. She was 48.

She is survived by her husband Jason Michaels and their son Stevie who is 10

== Filmography ==
=== Producer ===
- Ramona and Beezus (2010)
- Monte Carlo (2011)
- If I Stay (2014)
- You're Not You (2014)
- The Best of Me (2014)
- Unforgettable (2017)

=== Co-producer ===
- Catwoman (2004)

=== Executive producer ===
- What a Girl Wants (2003)
- New York Minute (2004)
- The Sisterhood of the Traveling Pants (2005)
- The Sisterhood of the Traveling Pants 2 (2008)
- Nights in Rodanthe (2008)
- The Lucky One (2012)
- Beaches (TV) (2017)
- For Life (TV series) (2020–2021)
