= Monte Carlo (2011 film) =

2011 film by Thomas Bezucha

- Theatrical release poster
- Directed by: Thomas Bezucha
- Screenplay by: Thomas Bezucha; April Blair; Maria Maggenti
- Story by: Kelly Bowe
- Based on: Headhunters by Jules Bass
- Produced by: Denise Di Novi; Alison Greenspan; Nicole Kidman; Arnon Milchan
- Starring: Selena Gomez; Leighton Meester; Katie Cassidy; Cory Monteith; Andie MacDowell
- Cinematography: Jonathan Brown
- Edited by: Jeffrey Ford
- Music by: Michael Giacchino
- Production companies: Fox 2000 Pictures; Regency Enterprises; Di Novi Pictures; Dune Entertainment; Blossom Films
- Distributed by: 20th Century Fox
- Release date: July 1, 2011
- Running time: 109 minutes
- Country: United States
- Language: English
- Budget: $20 million
- Box office: $39.7 million

Monte Carlo is a 2011 American adventure-romantic comedy film based on the 2001 novel Headhunters by Rankin/Bass co-founder Jules Bass. It was directed by Thomas Bezucha. Denise Di Novi, Alison Greenspan, Nicole Kidman, and Arnon Milchan produced the film for Fox 2000 Pictures and Regency Enterprises. It began production in Harghita, Romania on May 5, 2010.

It stars Selena Gomez, Leighton Meester and Katie Cassidy as three girls posing as wealthy socialites in Monte Carlo, Monaco.

The film was released on July 1, 2011. It features the song "Who Says" by Selena Gomez & the Scene (whose album When the Sun Goes Down which included the song, was released 3 days before the film's release) and numerous songs by British singer Mika. Monte Carlo received mixed reviews from critics, but earned $39.7 million on a $20 million budget. 20th Century Fox Home Entertainment released Monte Carlo on DVD and Blu-ray Disc on October 18, 2011.

== Plot ==
Grace Bennett is a NYU-bound, Texas high-school student who works as a waitress in a restaurant with her high school dropout, best friend Emma Perkins, to earn money for a post-graduation trip to Paris, France. Grace's stepfather pays for her uptight older stepsister Meg Kelly to join them, and Emma goes to Paris despite her boyfriend Owen's marriage proposal.

The trip quickly proves to be a disappointment as the girls discover they were ripped off, with a cramped hotel room and a tour that moves too fast for anyone to appreciate anything properly. After missing the bus and being left behind by their tour guide at the Eiffel Tower, the three girls seek refuge from the rain in a posh hotel.

The hotel staff and paparazzi mistake Grace for the spoiled celebutante British heiress Cordelia Winthrop-Scott, Grace's double, who leaves rather than stay to attend an auction for a Romanian charity to which she is to donate a Bulgari necklace. Despite Meg's protests, the three girls spend the night in Cordelia's suite and fly to Monte Carlo with Cordelia's luggage the next day.

At the Hotel de Paris in Monte Carlo, the girls meet Theo Marchand, the son of the philanthropist hosting the charity. Theo is cold towards the three because he loathes Cordelia's spoiled nature. He escorts them to a ball, where Grace successfully fools Cordelia's aunt Alicia and Emma dances with Prince Domenico. Meg reunites with Riley, an Australian backpacker she briefly met in Paris. They find they have things in common and spend time together before he leaves for Italy. Meanwhile, Owen travels to Paris in search of Emma.

When Grace participates in a polo game, Alicia discovers the impersonation because of Grace's different riding style. After calling the real Cordelia confirming her suspicion, Alicia believes she is a lookalike that Cordelia hired to take her place while she parties.

Theo grows attracted to "Cordelia's" frank personality, while Domenico invites Emma to a party on a yacht. Emma dresses up for the party in the Bulgari necklace but meets Meg on the way, who takes the necklace for safekeeping, but later forgets about it, accidentally leaving it in Riley's backpack. At the party, Emma becomes disillusioned by Domenico's obnoxiousness, snideness, and arrogance toward the waitresses.

After seeing Emma in the newspaper account of Grace's appearance at the ball, Owen goes to Monte Carlo. Cordelia also arrives there and sees Grace in the newspaper. Finding the necklace is missing, she calls the police. The girls are in search of Riley after Meg tells Grace and Emma that he is leaving on a train to Italy, but later on, he shows up at the hotel to return the necklace to Meg.

The trio finds Cordelia in the suite, and when she threatens to withdraw the necklace from the auction, the girls panic and tackle her to the couch. When the police come to the door, they muffle her screams, and Grace covers for them. They tie Cordelia to a chair and gag her by stuffing an apple in her mouth, so Grace can take her place at the auction while Emma watches Cordelia. Owen arrives at the hotel, finds Emma at the suite, and they reconcile.

Cordelia escapes while Emma is distracted and reveals Grace's fraud at the auction. She demands her arrest, but after Grace's sincere public confession, Alicia bids the unexpectedly large amount of €6 million for the necklace to save her. When Cordelia still insists on the arrest, the inspector observes that there is legally no crime as Cordelia has no evidence that Grace did anything wrong now that the necklace has been returned, she can't prove when Grace was posing as her without compromising her own recent actions, and Cordelia can't force legal action just because she's upset.

After the auction, the three girls leave and go their separate ways. Meg joins Riley on his global travels while Owen and Emma return to Texas, marry, and move into their own home. Theo and Grace reunite at the Romanian school, which the former runs and the latter volunteer-teaches.

== Cast ==
- Selena Gomez as
  - Grace Bennett, a teenager from Texas
  - Cordelia Winthrop-Scott, a British heiress
- Leighton Meester as Meg Kelly, Grace's older stepsister
- Katie Cassidy as Emma Perkins, Grace's best friend
- Cory Monteith as Owen Andrews, Emma's love interest
- Andie MacDowell as Pamela Bennett, Grace's mother
- Catherine Tate as Alicia Winthrop-Scott, Cordelia's aunt
- Pierre Boulanger as Theo Marchand, Grace's love interest
- Luke Bracey as Riley, Meg's love interest
- Brett Cullen as Robert Kelly, Meg's father and Grace's stepfather
- Christophe Malavoy as Bernard Marchand, Theo’s father
- Valérie Lemercier as Madame Valerie
- Giulio Berruti as Prince Domenico Da Silvano
- Franck de Lapersonne as Grand Belle's Manager
- Jeremiah Sullivan as Bartender 2
- Matt Devere as Steward on Jet

== Production ==
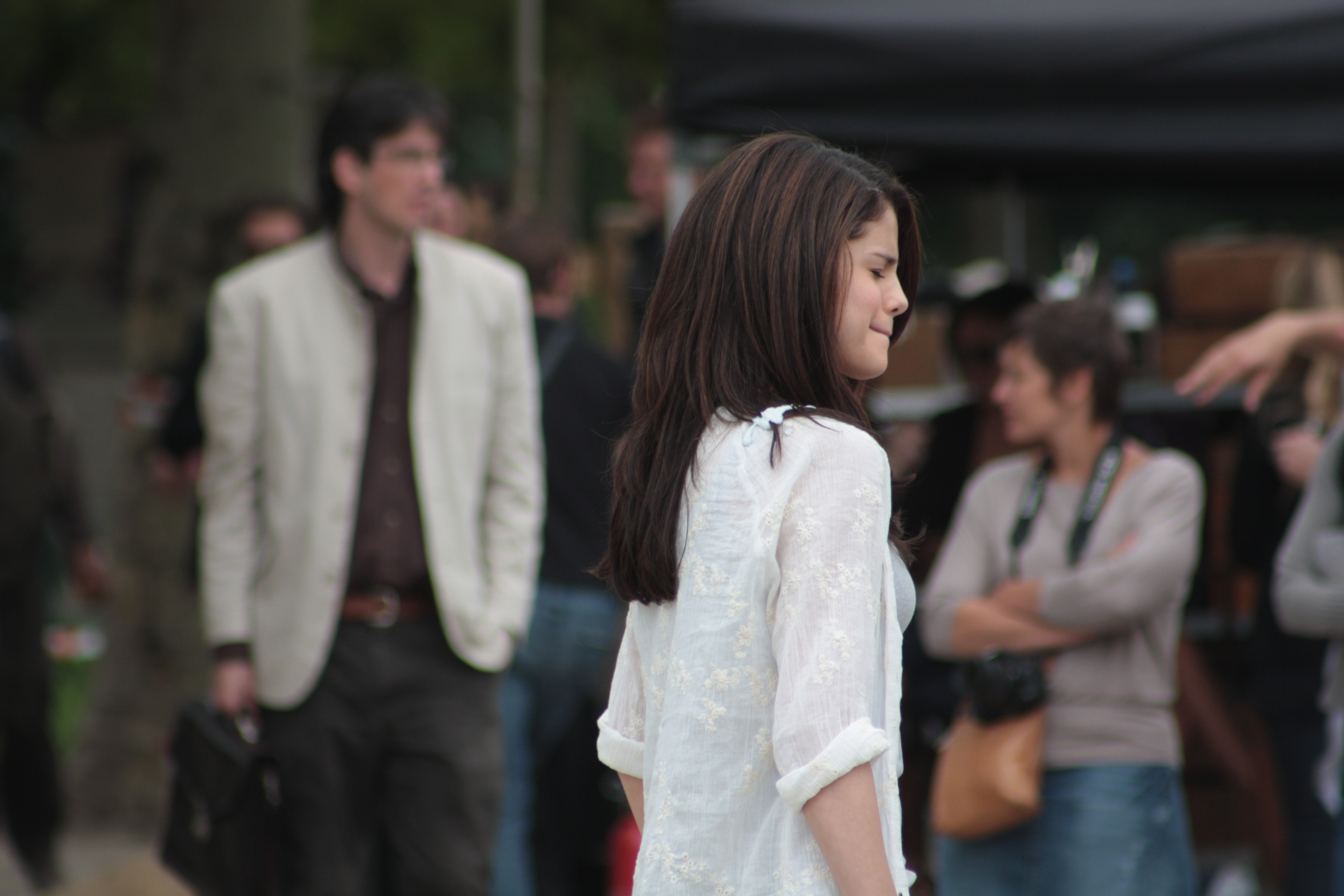
Gomez filming a scene on location in Paris, France

Monte Carlo is loosely based on the novel Headhunters by Jules Bass. The novel tells the story of four New Jersey women who pretend to be wealthy heiresses while searching for rich potential husbands in Monte Carlo. There, they meet four gigolos posing as wealthy playboys. Fox bought the film rights to the novel in 1999, three years prior to the novel's publication. In 2005, Hollywood trade magazine Variety announced that siblings Jez and John-Henry Butterworth would be writing the script. It was also reported that actress Nicole Kidman had signed on to play the lead, as well as to produce the film with Rick Schwartz.

The Butterworths were later fired and Tom Bezucha was hired to direct and co-write Monte Carlo. Bezucha and Maria Maggenti turned in a draft of the screenplay by July 2007; it starred Kidman as "one of three Midwestern schoolteachers who decide to ditch a disappointing no-frills holiday in Paris and pose as wealthy women vacationing in Monaco". However, in 2010, executives had the film rewritten again after deciding that the film should have a more youthful spin. The updated script was co-written by Bezucha and April Blair, and changed the three school teachers to two college students and a recent high-school graduate. Monte Carlo was shot in Budapest, Hungary; Dunakeszi, Hungary; Paris, France; Harghita, Romania; and Monte Carlo, Monaco. It began filming in Harghita on May 5, 2010, and wrapped on July 7, 2010. It is the first film to use the film studio Raleigh Studios Budapest.

In March 2010, it was announced that Selena Gomez had been cast as one of the film's leads following the script's rewrite. For the role, Gomez spent several weeks learning to play polo, and practicing how to fake an English accent. Leighton Meester also negotiated a deal to star as one of the leads that month and Katie Cassidy was cast as Emma in April. French actor Pierre Boulanger made his English-speaking feature debut in the film.

=== Soundtrack ===
The film's musical score was composed by Michael Giacchino, conducted by Tim Simonec and performed by the Hollywood Studio Symphony. To coincide with the film's release, a soundtrack album was released by Varèse Sarabande on June 28, 2011.

No.	Title	Length
1.	"Graceful Exit"	0:37
2.	"What Mom Would Have Wanted"	1:00
3.	"It's Not Magic"	0:58
4.	"Feeling Eiffel"	0:59
5.	"Grace Under Pressure"	1:01
6.	"Mirror Coincidence"	0:54
7.	"The Seduction of Paris"	0:58
8.	"Along for the Ride"	1:09
9.	"Seizing the Moment"	0:30
10.	"The Full Monte Carlo"	0:50
11.	"One Suite Deal"	0:37
12.	"Junk in the Trunks"	0:57
13.	"Ball In"	0:55
14.	"Pairing Up"	2:46
15.	"A Little Horse (s'il vous) Play"	0:49
16.	"Of Another Color"	0:53
17.	"Dressing Up and Dressing Down"	1:06
18.	"Jazz Cafe"	1:19
19.	"Staying Classy"	0:54
20.	"Hotel Keys"	1:49
21.	"You're Goin' Places, Kid"	2:11
22.	"Chasing Emma"	0:31
23.	"Have a Nice Trip"	0:43
24.	"Megsmerized"	0:44
25.	"Cordelia Arrives"	1:30
26.	"Cordelia's Not So Suite"	1:09
27.	"Time to Go"	1:27
28.	"Missing Links"	1:21
29.	"Return Engagement"	1:50
30.	"Protection and (Room) Service"	0:28
31.	"Just Stay Here"	0:50
32.	"I Don't Want to Lose You"	0:37
33.	"It's Too Much"	0:50
34.	"Just a Regular Girl"	0:44
35.	"Almost Everyone Is Happy"	1:04
36.	"Separate Ways"	3:02
37.	"Grace Be with You"	1:24
38.	"Of Another Color (extended version)"	2:51
39.	"Making Light"	3:38
40.	"Grace's Theme"	0:12

== Reception ==
=== Critical response ===
Monte Carlo received mixed reviews from critics. Review aggregator Rotten Tomatoes gives the film a score of 40% based on 90 reviews, with an average rating of 4.8/10. The website's consensus states, "Although it has its charming moments, Monte Carlo is mostly silly, predictable stuff that never pushes beyond the boundaries of formula." At Metacritic, the film received a score of 43 out of 100 based on reviews from 23 critics indicating "mixed or average reviews". Audiences polled by CinemaScore gave the film an average grade of "A-" on an A+ to F scale.

Logan Hill of Vulture wrote, "The film wallows in expensive clothes and locales but, like a puff-piece celebrity profile, wants you to have it both ways: to ogle the glamour and admire the righteous soul that’s purportedly beneath the surface but barely in evidence."

Ben Sachs of the Chicago Reader wrote that "the movie hits a surprising range of emotional grace notes, including several moments of genuine regret, and concludes with an understated moral lesson about the value of self-respect over social status." Sandie Chen of Common Sense Media said the film was "silly, but sweet".

=== Accolades ===
Award	Date of ceremony	Category	Recipient(s)	Result	Ref.
ALMA Awards	September 10, 2011	Favorite Movie Actress Comedy/Musical	Selena Gomez	Nominated	
Bravo Otto	March 21, 2012	Super Female Movie Star	Selena Gomez	Silver	
Guild of Music Supervisors Awards	February 9, 2012	Best Music Supervision in Trailers	Vanessa Jorge (Aspect Ratio)	Nominated	
Teen Choice Awards	August 7, 2011	Choice Movie: Summer	Monte Carlo	Nominated	
Teen Choice Awards	August 7, 2011	Choice Summer Movie Star: Male	Cory Monteith	Nominated	
Teen Choice Awards	August 7, 2011	Choice Summer Movie Star: Female	Selena Gomez	Nominated	

== Home media ==
Fox Home Entertainment released Monte Carlo on DVD and Blu-ray on October 18, 2011. The DVD extras include deleted scenes, a feature titled "Ding Dang Delicious: The Boys of Monte Carlo", a "Backstage Pass" and a theatrical trailer. The Blu-ray Disc features all the DVD features plus the addition of "Monte Carlo Couture", "Jet Setter's Dream", "Gossip with the Girls" and a digital copy of the film.
