= Deathray (disambiguation) =

Deathray is a post-punk genre band from Sacramento, California.

Deathray may refer to:

- A death ray, a theoretical particle beam or electromagnetic weapon of the 1920s through the 1930s
- A raygun, a fictional energy weapon
- Archimedes' heat ray, also known as Archemedes' death ray
- The Death Ray (1925 film), a 1925 Soviet science fiction film
- The Death Ray, the British title for the 1932 American film Murder at Dawn, directed by Richard Thorpe
- The Death Ray (comics), a graphic novel by Daniel Clowes
- Death Ray (magazine), a British science fiction magazine
- "Death Ray", a song by Oliver Tree from Love You Madly Hate You Badly, 2026

== See also ==
- Death rays should not be confused with Death Race (disambiguation).
