= Roy Knyrim =

American film director and effects artist

- Born: Roy Knyrim; 1966 or 1967 (age 58–59); Hilton, New York
- Education: Hilton High School
- Occupations: Film director; special effects makeup artist

Roy Knyrim (born 1966/1967) is an American film director and special effects makeup artist. He directed Demons at the Door (2004), Cemetery Gates (2006), Night Skies (2007), and Death Racers (2008). His credits as a special effects and makeup artist include the fourth, fifth, and sixth films in the Children of the Corn film series, as well as A Nightmare on Elm Street 5: The Dream Child (1989), Gods and Monsters (1998), 2001 Maniacs (2005), and Death House (2017). He also provided miniature models for such films as The Abyss (1989), Tremors, Darkman (both 1990), and Freddy's Dead: The Final Nightmare (1991).

Knyrim heads the special effects workshop SOTA FX (State of the Art Effects).

== Early life and education ==
Knyrim was born in Hilton, New York. He began creating special makeup and creature effects in his second grade of elementary school, and filmed them using super 8 film. He has stated, "Mostly I did those in my basement. Friday the 13th was a big influence, but I made up my own stuff. They were a lot of slash, a lot of splat. A couple of them were pretty good – but most of them were garbage. I was in a hurry to do them and get them developed so I could look at them and show them." Knyrim graduated from Hilton High School in 1985.

== Career ==
Knyrim's early credits as an effects artist include the Troma Entertainment films The Toxic Avenger Part II and The Toxic Avenger Part III: The Last Temptation of Toxie, both released in 1989.

After moving to southern California, Knyrim, along with Jerry Macaluso and Patrick Tantalo, founded the special effects workshop and production company SOTA FX (State of the Art Effects). With SOTA FX, Knyrim has provided special effects makeup on a number of films, including the 1998 film Gods and Monsters, as well as the television series Weird Science.

Knyrim directed the 2004 direct-to-video horror film Demons at the Door, which features music by the American hip hop duo Insane Clown Posse. According to Fangoria, by May 2006, during the production of the Knyrim-directed horror film Cemetery Gates, he had "a slew of Insane Clown Posse videos under his belt". Following the release of Cemetery Gates later that year, Knyrim went on to direct the 2007 science-fiction horror film Night Skies and the 2008 action film Death Racers, the latter of which features Insane Clown Posse in acting roles. Knyrim is co-directing the upcoming horror comedy film Sorority of the Damned alongside Joe Davison, who will also star in the film.

== Selected filmography ==
=== Film ===
==== As director/writer ====
Year	Title	Director	Writer	Notes	Ref(s)
2004	Demons at the Door	Yes		Direct-to-video film	
2006	Cemetery Gates	Yes			
2007	Night Skies	Yes			
2008	Death Racers	Yes	Co-writer	Direct-to-video film; co-wrote story with Patrick Tantalo	
TBA	Sorority of the Damned	Co-director		Co-directing with Joe Davison	

==== As special and visual effects/makeup artist ====
Year	Title	Credited as	Notes	Ref(s)
1988	Slugs	First assistant special effects		
1989	The Toxic Avenger Part II	Key gore effects artist		
1989	Society	Additional makeup effects		
1989	The Abyss	Additional model maker (Los Angeles surface unit)		
1989	A Nightmare on Elm Street 5: The Dream Child	Special makeup effects artist		
1989	The Toxic Avenger Part III: The Last Temptation of Toxie	Key gore effects artist		
1989	Psycho Cop	Effects makeup team		
1990	Tremors	Model builder (basement scene)		
1990	Darkman	Model builder		
1991	Steel and Lace	Makeup effects designer		
1991	Freddy's Dead: The Final Nightmare	Model builder (Freddy's house)		
1991	Karate Cop	Special makeup effects artist	Direct-to-video film	
1992	Auntie Lee's Meat Pies	Key makeup effects		
1994	Dinosaur Island	Fabricator (cave creature)		
1994	Mirror, Mirror II: Raven Dance	Special makeup and creature effects		
1995	Fist of the North Star	Visual effects supervisor/special makeup effects		
1995	Howling: New Moon Rising	Makeup effects designer (SOTA FX)	Direct-to-video film	
1996	Amityville Dollhouse	Special makeup effects	Direct-to-video film	
1996	Children of the Corn IV: The Gathering	Special effects makeup (Josiah's makeup)	Direct-to-video film	
1996	Uncle Sam	Special makeup effects supervisor (SOTA FX)		
1997	Leave It to Beaver	Beaver stunt dummy fabricator		
1998	Gods and Monsters	Makeup effects supervisor		
1998	Modern Vampires	Makeup effects supervisor/special makeup effects artist	Also known as Revenant	
1998	Children of the Corn V: Fields of Terror	Makeup effects supervisor		
1999	Wishmaster 2: Evil Never Dies	Special makeup effects	Direct-to-video film	
1999	Children of the Corn 666: Isaac's Return	Special makeup effects (SOTA FX)	Direct-to-video film	
2000	G-Men from Hell	Special makeup effects artist		
2001	Wishmaster 3: Beyond the Gates of Hell	Special makeup effects artist		
2002	Wishmaster: The Prophecy Fulfilled	Special makeup effects supervisor		
2005	2001 Maniacs	Special effects supervisor		
2005	Urban Legends: Bloody Mary	Special effects makeup	Direct-to-video film	
2006	Trapped Ashes	Makeup and creature effects (Japan and Vancouver)		
2008	Starship Troopers 3: Marauder	Special effects supervisor	Direct-to-video film	
2009	Forget Me Not	Special makeup effects		
2011	Super Shark	Special effects makeup		
2012	2-Headed Shark Attack	Practical shark supervisor		
2012	The Ghastly Love of Johnny X	Special effects supervisor		
2013	Big Ass Spider!	Makeup effects designer		
2015	Tales of Halloween	Assistant makeup artist/makeup designer and supervisor		
2015	Sinister 2	Makeup designer (SOTA FX)		
2016	Range 15	Special makeup effects designer		
2017	XX	Special makeup effects artist	Segment: "Her Only Living Son"	
2017	Mohawk	Special effects makeup		
2017	Death House	Special effects makeup		
2020	Breach	Makeup effects designer	Also known as Anti-Life	
2021	Willy's Wonderland	Makeup effects designer and supervisor		

=== Television ===
Year	Title	Credited as	Notes	Ref(s)
1996	Humanoids from the Deep	Makeup effects supervisor	Television film	
1998	Halloweentown	Makeup effects designer	Television film	
2001	Halloweentown II: Kalabar's Revenge	Creature and makeup effects designer (SOTA FX)	Television film	
2004	Halloweentown High	Makeup effects designer	Television film	
2005	Snakeman	Makeup effects designer	Television film	
2006	Return to Halloweentown	Makeup effects designer	Television film	

=== Music videos ===
- "Boogieman" by Twiztid, 2015
