= Bubble Bath Babes =

1991 video game

- NES cover art
- Developer: C&E
- Publishers: TW/JP: Hacker International; NA: American Video Entertainment
- Composer: Kossel Huang
- Platforms: NES, Sega Mega Drive
- Release: NES: NA/JP/AU: 1991; Mega Drive: TW: 1993
- Genre: Puzzle
- Mode: Single-player

Bubble Bath Babes is a 1991 adult-oriented puzzle video game developed by C&E for the NES. Due to its adult nature, it was not licensed by Nintendo, and released via mail-order by Panesian—along with Hot Slots and Peek-A-Boo Poker.

The U.S. licensed version from American Video Entertainment, was released in 1991 as Mermaids of Atlantis, with all adult elements removed or obscured. In the same year, a localized version leaving intact those contents was released by Hacker International in Japan as Soap Panic, and still in the U.S. by Panesian.

A Genesis / Mega Drive version was released under the name Magic Bubble in 1993 which is more suitable for all ages.

NES screenshot

== Gameplay ==
Gameplay is reminiscent of Tetris (1985) and the succeeding Puzzle Bobble (1994). The goal is to steer clusters of rising bubbles and place them so that they connect to others with a matching color along the top screen part. If a sufficient number of similar bubbles are touching, they will be cleared and all free neighboring bubbles will rise further, allowing for combos. If the accumulated bubbles on the screen reach the playing bottom area, it reaches game over. Finally, when a level is completed the player is rewarded with erotica.

== Reception ==
Computer and Video Games said "The limited graphics make the sauciness factor rubbish".

Allgame gave a retrospective score of 2.5 out of 5 stars, saying "Bubble Bath Babes is most notable for being one of three NES games to feature nudity, but its bubble-matching gameplay is good enough to keep it from being just a novelty. Unfortunately, the mild adult content overwhelms the aura of the game, even though it is a small part of the overall package. The topless woman at the bottom of the screen is tastefully depicted, but her inclusion is ultimately gratuitous since she has no effect on the action."

The game later became a rare collectible item in North America due to its limited release, with complete copies selling for thousands of dollars.
