= Night Skies (2007 film) =

- DVD cover for Night Skies
- Directed by: Roy Knyrim
- Written by: Steve B. Harris (story adaptation); Eric Miller (adaptation)
- Produced by: Mike Greene; Steve B. Harris; Jerry Macaluso
- Starring: A. J. Cook; Jason Connery; George Stults; Ashley Peldon; Joseph Sikora; Gwendoline Yeo
- Distributed by: Sony Pictures Home Entertainment
- Release date: January 23, 2007
- Running time: 84 minutes
- Country: United States
- Language: English

Night Skies is a 2007 American science fiction horror film directed by Roy Knyrim and starring Jason Connery, A.J. Cook, George Stults, Ashley Peldon, Joseph Sikora and Gwendoline Yeo. It is set during the time of the so-called "Phoenix Lights", one of the largest UFO sightings ever.

== Plot ==
In the opening sequence, Senator John McCain is interviewed about alleged UFO sightings across Arizona, acknowledging them but admitting he has no explanation for the "Phoenix Lights."

Opening text states that the film is based on the largest UFO sightings in history and presents the events as true, supported by witness hypnotherapy and rehabilitation. A bleeding woman runs through the woods to a cabin during the opening credits, but something appears to follow her before the scene cuts to black.

In a flashback, five friends—Joe, Lily, Molly, June and Matt—travel to Las Vegas in an RV. Matt, driving after Joe suggested taking back roads, becomes lost. Lily, Matt's girlfriend, is frustrated that he spent money on the RV rather than saving for their wedding, and later appears to be vomiting. Strange lights appear in the sky, while Molly, Matt's sister, has a terrifying encounter with a shadowy figure that initially seems like a nightmare. Seven lights eventually form a row overhead, and the RV's radio activates without warning.

Distracted by the lights, Matt crashes into a pole after nearly colliding with a truck. A fight breaks out between him and the truck driver, but ends when June reveals that Joe is seriously injured by a large knife embedded in his shoulder. The driver, Richard, advises against removing it, warning that it may have severed an artery. Richard, who has Army medical training, treats Joe with vodka. He reveals that he was a P.O.W. during the Gulf War, leaving him with PTSD and a history as a recovering alcoholic.

As strange clicking sounds emerge from the woods, Matt sees a shadowy figure and follows it, believing it is Lily. He disappears, apparently attacked or abducted. He later returns, apologises to Lily and appears more receptive to her, but she cannot tell him that she is pregnant before June calls for help: Joe is bleeding heavily. Richard confirms that the knife has struck an artery and Joe urgently needs hospital treatment. With no mobile reception, Matt and Richard leave to seek help, while Lily, Molly and June remain with Joe. Lily tells Molly that she has not told Matt about the pregnancy because she does not think he is ready.

Matt and Richard reach a cabin, where Matt suddenly disappears. When an alien appears behind Richard, he shoots it, only to discover that he has killed Matt. Richard considers suicide before returning to the others. He explains that aliens are outside and that Matt is gone. When the radio plays and Lily hears what sounds like Matt outside, Molly believes she sees him injured and begging for help. Despite Richard's warnings, Molly and Lily go outside; Molly is beamed into the sky by a green light.

Back inside the RV, the group hear aliens on the roof. Richard fires at them, but June reveals that Joe has died and is then abducted through a window. As the aliens enter, Richard tells Lily to flee to the cabin while he holds them off.

Returning to the opening scene, Lily and Richard reach the cabin as the RV and truck are destroyed and apparently beamed away. Richard explains that the aliens manipulate their victims by impersonating people and creating false sights and sounds, confirming that the injured Matt was an alien. Lily regrets not telling Matt about her pregnancy. The aliens break into the cabin, abducting both her and Richard.

Aboard the alien ship, Richard sees the aliens experimenting on Lily. She tells him that they have taken her baby and asks him to shoot her. He reluctantly does so before the aliens restrain him and begin experimenting on him.

Later, a police officer finds Richard in a deserted area. A text epilogue states that he was discovered 100 miles from the vehicles' location and, after rehabilitation, recalled fragments of the encounter. Neither the vehicles nor the other victims were ever found. Richard subsequently took a lie detector test, which he passed. The epilogue concludes that the lights continue to appear over Phoenix, Arizona, to this day.

== Cast ==
- Jason Connery as Richard, an army veteran who helps Joe. He also bonds with Molly and Lily, much to Matt's annoyance.
- A. J. Cook as Lily, Matt's pregnant girlfriend. She is sincere and thoughtful, but is frustrated with Matt neglecting their relationship.
- George Stults as Matt, Lily's self-centered boyfriend and Molly's brother, who often dismisses Lily, and cares more for his RV than his relationship.
- Ashley Peldon as Molly, Matt's sister, who is seen as unintelligent but is actually astute. She bonds with Richard throughout the night.
- Gwendoline Yeo as June, Joe's wife.
- Joseph Sikora as Joe, June's husband.
- Michael Dorn as Kyle, a local Sheriff who finds Richard after his abduction.
