= Lady Sword =

1992 video game

Lady Sword Ryakudatsusareta 10-nin no Otome レディソード 略奪された10人の乙女
- Developer(s): Games Express
- Publisher(s): Games Express
- Composer(s): Keine
- Platform(s): PC Engine
- Release: JP: July 13, 1992
- Genre(s): Role-playing game
- Mode(s): Single-player

Lady Sword: Ryakudatsu Sareta 10 Nin no Otome (レディソード 略奪された10人の乙女), Lady Sword: The 10 Captive Maidens, is an adult 1989 role-playing video game that was released by Games Express for the PC Engine in Japan the year of 1992 for the PC Engine. The game was never released outside of Japan. However, an unofficial English translation has been made.

== Gameplay ==
The game's format is first-person, much similar to Dungeon Master or the Might and Magic franchise. The combat is turn based with traditional RPG elements, although they are limited with several distinctions from now-traditional RPGs. Unlike traditional RPGs, a complete level-up system is not provided in the game, making the player oblivious to what experience level they are on. Another distinction is that when the player's health gets low, then healing is only available by way of resting. However, a dangerous dream monster known as Dream Flayer will occasionally appear to attack the hero while sleeping. The player starts off without a map of the dungeon, although an item named Faun Fresco can soon be picked up to help the player find their way through the Tower of Faunus. There are additional items, which include the Beezleboule, a magical skull-like device that helps the player detect fake walls, the Tachyo-Stone, which lets the player create their own waypoint, and the Polytron, that teleports the player direct back to that waypoint. Every floor of the tower has several protectors (which are mainly Elemental Spirits) that must be defeated in order to advance floors. Certain protectors can only be defeated by way of particular items. Failure to find and use the necessary weapon will only result in death for the hero.

== Plot ==
A mysterious swordsman named Kenshi is traveling through the deadly cursed labyrinth Tower of Faunus, on a search for a powerful weapon known as the Lady Sword - and a young lady who was kidnapped and locked away in the tower by inhabiting monsters. In addition to finding the missing lady and the powerful sword, there are Ten Maidens who were kidnapped by the monsters, and are trapped within the tower themselves. Providing assistance to Kenshi is Weintein, a white wizard, and another swordsman named Palermo. Additionally, the souls of maidens who were slaughtered by the monsters will telepathically contact Kenshi periodically.
