= American Game Cartridges =

American video game development company

- Company type: Private
- Industry: Video games
- Founded: 1990
- Defunct: 1994
- Fate: Bankruptcy
- Headquarters: Chandler, Arizona, U.S.
- Key people: Michael S. Williams; President of ShareData; Richard C. Frick; VP of Product Development at ShareData
- Parent: ShareData

American Game Cartridges (AGC) was an American video game developer and publisher established as a subsidiary of ShareData in 1990. Like ShareData, American Game Cartridges was headquartered in Chandler, Arizona. AGC published three video games for the Nintendo Entertainment System (NES) in 1990.

Prior to the founding of American Game Cartridges, ShareData hired Richard C. Frick as Vice President of Product Development. Frick worked previously at Atari Games, and had some experience with their console game subsidiary, Tengen. Tengen was one of several game developers who rejected the contract terms that Nintendo imposed on its licensees. Instead, such developers published unlicensed games that defeated the NES's lockout chip. Frick was acquainted with this strategy, and applied it at ShareData's new company, American Game Cartridges. To defeat the NES's lockout chip, called 10NES, AGC licensed technology from Color Dreams.

AGC also licensed two titles from arcade game manufacturer Exidy: Chiller (1986) and Death Race (1976), which they adapted to the NES in 1990. Chiller was AGC's first game release, and was also ShareData's first title for the NES. Death Race quickly followed, as did an original work called Shockwave (1990).

Keeping with ShareData's business model of producing low-cost video games, AGC attempted to undersell their competition by as much as 30%. However, debts mounted throughout 1991, and by the fourth quarter AGC's creditors were trying to force the company into a reorganization under Chapter 11 of the United States' Bankruptcy Code. ShareData itself was among the creditors pressuring American Game Cartridges, and American Game Cartridges filed for reorganization under Chapter 11 soon after. They remained in Chapter 11 until January 1994, when they finally filed their plan to reorganize.

Richard Frick left ShareData and American Game Cartridges amidst these difficulties, and started another unlicensed NES game development company called American Video Entertainment. Meanwhile, developer Keith Rupp of American Game Cartridges completed a fourth title, Wally Bear and the NO! Gang, but AGC's financial difficulties preempted its release. Frick's new company secured the rights to the game, and published it in 1992.

American Game Cartridges planned several other game releases, including a conversion of Exidy's Crossbow (1983), but was unable to complete development.

== See also ==
- Camerica
- Hacker International
- Home Entertainment Suppliers
- List of Nintendo Entertainment System games
- Video game publisher
