= Hot Slots =

1991 video game

- Cover art
- Developer: Idea-Tek
- Publisher: Hacker International/Panesian
- Platform: NES/Famicom
- Release: JP: 1991; NA: 1991
- Genre: Simulation (slot machine)
- Mode: Single-player

Hot Slots, or AV Pachisuro (AVパチスロ), is a slot machine simulation video game for the Nintendo Entertainment System developed by Idea-Tek, and published by Hacker International/Panesian in 1991.

AV Pachisuro is the title of the Japanese release for the Family Computer (or Famicom); Hot Slots (titled Hot Slot in-game) is the English-language version of the game published for the NES. The title AV Pachisuro combines the Japanese-coined English initialism AV (adult video) with the Japanese contracted word pachisuro (a portmanteau of pachinko and slot).

== Gameplay ==
To begin a game, the player chooses one of three slot machines: Cutie Bunny, Juicy Fruits, or Las Vegas. Each machine has a distinct visual design and musical score. After purchasing "medallions" (token coins), the player may play up to five medallions in a machine for each pull. The player stops each reel by pressing a direction on the D-pad. Between spins, the player can optionally switch to another machine.

Hot Slots is an eroge, a video game that rewards game progress, persistence, or performance with images that are sexually explicit or suggestive. Each slot machine is accompanied by a scantily-clad hostess, who appears at intervals when the player's winnings surpass a certain threshold. When the player nets a profit of $210, the game displays a full-screen cartoon image of the partially clothed hostess with a caption or speech balloon. At a net profit of $300, she loses more of her clothing; at $450, she appears nude.

== Reception ==
Allgame gave the game a rating of 1 star out of a possible 5.

The game later became a rare collectible item in North America due to its limited release, with complete copies selling for thousands of dollars.

Games journalist Jeff Gerstmann ranks Hot Slots as the worst NES game released in North America.

== See also ==
- Peek-A-Boo Poker (1990)
- Magic Bubble (1991)
- List of Family Computer games
- List of Nintendo Entertainment System games
