= Phoenix Forgotten =

- Theatrical release poster
- Directed by: Justin Barber
- Written by: T. S. Nowlin; Justin Barber
- Produced by: Ridley Scott; T. S. Nowlin; Wes Ball; Courtney Solomon; Mark Canton
- Starring: Chelsea Lopez; Florence Hartigan; Justin Matthews; Luke Spencer Roberts
- Cinematography: Jay Keitel
- Edited by: Joshua Rosenfield
- Music by: Mondo Boys
- Production companies: Cinelou Films; The Fyzz Facility; Scott Free Productions
- Distributed by: Cinelou Films
- Release date: April 21, 2017
- Running time: 87 minutes
- Country: United States
- Language: English
- Budget: $2.8 million
- Box office: $3.7 million

Phoenix Forgotten is a 2017 American found footage science fiction horror film directed by Justin Barber in his directorial debut, and written by Barber and T. S. Nowlin. The film is also produced by Nowlin, alongside Ridley Scott, Wes Ball, Courtney Solomon and Mark Canton.

Originally advertised as Phoenix, the film tells the story of the disappearance of three teenagers who set out to find the source of the widely reported 1997 UFO phenomenon known as the "Phoenix Lights". It was released on April 21, 2017, to mixed reviews, with many critics unfavorably comparing it to The Blair Witch Project.

== Plot ==
Sophie Bishop and her boyfriend Dan visit Sophie's parents in Phoenix, Arizona on the 20th anniversary of her older brother Josh's disappearance. On March 13, 1997, during Sophie's sixth birthday party, the family witnesses the Phoenix Lights, which Josh records. Several lights appear in a "V" formation before disappearing, followed by fighter jets. Josh becomes convinced they are UFOs and later investigates with his friends Ashley and Mark. Two astronomers suggest the lights were flares dropped by jets from Luke Air Force Base, but Josh and Ashley remain unconvinced.

When more mysterious lights appear over Mesa, Josh and Mark travel there to film them. They encounter a distant spotlight and discover Sheriff's Deputies and mysterious men whose cars have no licence plates. Spotted by the men, they flee. Josh later predicts where the lights will next appear. In the present, Sophie investigates the trio's disappearance, finding that only their abandoned car and a camera containing one tape were recovered. The footage shows their journey and a charred animal corpse.

Believing Josh used a second camera, Sophie investigates his access to school film equipment. Months later, the former film teacher finds a damaged camera that had been mailed to the school years earlier. Sophie and Dan recover its tape. Disturbed by what she sees, Sophie interviews a Captain at Luke Air Force Base, who allegedly orders her to "not let the footage get out". The film then reveals the tape's remaining footage.

Josh, Ashley and Mark continue into the desert and record a mysterious light that accelerates across the horizon before splitting into smaller lights. On their return, they become lost. Mark leaves to locate their car and returns distressed, refusing to explain what he saw. The light later pursues their vehicle, disables it and disappears. While walking towards town, Mark develops a nosebleed, fever and disorientation, hears voices and runs into the desert after claiming to see his brother. The light returns and he disappears.

Ashley develops similar symptoms, including hair falling out. While she and Josh search for a distant house, they find more charred animals. Ashley hears an unknown sound and claims to see her father. The light returns, producing lightning and powerful winds. Josh films its source: an alien craft resembling several concentric, rotating rings, similar to the ophanim discussed during their UFO research. Ashley is lifted into the air and abducted.

Josh reaches the deserted house while pursued by the craft, which causes appliances to explode and gravity to distort. It removes the roof and abducts Josh before the camera cuts out. The footage resumes briefly showing space before the camera falls to Earth, recording the sunrise until its battery dies. Closing captions state that the government denies any connection between the Phoenix Lights and the trio's disappearance.

== Cast ==
- Chelsea Lopez as Ashley
- Florence Hartigan as Sophie
- Justin Matthews as Mark
- Luke Spencer Roberts as Josh

== Release ==
In the United States and Canada, Phoenix Forgotten opened on April 21, 2017, alongside The Promise, Born in China, Free Fire and Unforgettable, and it was projected to gross around $2 million from 1,588 theaters in its opening weekend. It grossed $1.8 million in its opening weekend, finishing 11th at the box office.

== Critical response ==
On review aggregator website Rotten Tomatoes, the film has an approval rating of 44% based on 16 reviews, with an average rating of 5.1/10. On Metacritic the film has a score of 33 out of 100, based on 5 critics, indicating "generally unfavorable reviews". Audiences polled by CinemaScore gave the film an average grade of "C−" on an A+ to F scale.
