= The Unholy (1988 film) =

- Theatrical release poster
- Directed by: Camilo Vila
- Written by: Philip Yordan; Fernando Fonseca
- Produced by: Mathew Hayden
- Starring: Ben Cross; Ned Beatty; William Russ; Jill Carroll; Hal Holbrook; Trevor Howard
- Cinematography: Henry Vargas
- Edited by: Mark Melnick
- Music by: Roger Bellon
- Production company: Team Effort
- Distributed by: Vestron Pictures
- Release date: April 22, 1988
- Running time: 102 minutes
- Country: United States
- Language: English
- Budget: $7 million
- Box office: $6.3 million

The Unholy is a 1988 American horror film directed by Camilo Vila and starring Ben Cross, Ned Beatty, Hal Holbrook, and Trevor Howard in his final role. The film follows a Roman Catholic priest in New Orleans who finds himself battling a demonic force after being appointed to a new parish.

== Plot ==
While praying in St. Agnes church in New Orleans, Father Dennis is confronted by a demon taking the shape of a seductive woman. The woman tears his throat open, killing him. Years later, at a New Orleans hotel, Father Michael is called to talk to Claude, a man threatening to jump from the top floor of the building. When he offers Claude a cigarette, Michael is pulled out the window and falls to the ground. Inexplicably, he survives the fall without injury. After the incident, Michael is appointed to the St. Agnes parish by the Archbishop Mosely; the parish was closed after Dennis's unsolved murder.

Upon moving into the rectory, Michael is notified by Lieutenant Stern that another priest was murdered there before Dennis. Michael finds mention of Millie, a waitress at the Threshold, a local black magic performance art club, in Dennis's journal; Michael visits Millie, who is evasive. She later comes to the parish, claiming to Michael that she saw Dennis for confession before his death; during the confession, she admitted to giving her soul to Luke, the club's owner, whom she claims is the Devil incarnate. Luke visits Michael, claiming that the Satanic shows put on at the club are only gimmicks, and that he does not actually believe in them; however, he says he has been recently experiencing supernatural phenomena and begs for Michael's help. Michael agrees to spend an evening in Luke's apartment, where he witnesses furious poltergeist activity.

When Michael brings the information to Archbishop Mosely, he is informed that Dennis was approached by Millie and Luke in an identical manner before being murdered. Father Silva, an elderly blind demonologist, says that Michael has been "chosen" to fight the devil. However, Michael dismisses the notion. Millie is incarcerated in a psychiatric ward after attempting to kill Luke, and Michael visits her. In a fit of madness, she claims that Luke tried to rape her, and that Dennis has been talking to her. That night, Michael has a nightmare of the Demon, and receives a call from Dennis, who claims to be "waiting for him in hell." Millie arrives in the middle of the night begging for help, and Michael agrees to let her stay in the rectory.

While cleaning the church with the housekeeper Teresa, Millie is fascinated by a statue of the Immaculate Heart of Mary. According to Teresa, it was salvaged from a church in a foreign country that burned down. Stern warns Mosely that Michael is in danger, suspecting Millie was responsible for the previous murders of the St. Agnes priests; Mosely assures him that Michael is safe. Meanwhile, Millie discovers a book in which she reads of the Unholy, a demon which seeks to corrupt and then take pure souls. To prevent herself from being a target, she propositions Michael to take her virginity, which he refuses. Convinced that Luke planted the book, Michael confronts him. However, Luke denies it.

The next day, Michael finds Luke's eviscerated corpse hanging above the church altar in the pose of the Cross of Saint Peter. Seated in a pew is Claude, who begs Michael's forgiveness for pulling him out the window. Claude then begins to bleed profusely from his eyes and mouth, and bursts into flames at the foot of the Immaculate Heart of Mary statue; Luke's corpse also ignites. Michael meets with Mosely and Silva, who says that the Unholy will manifest to Michael between Ash Wednesday and Easter, when it will try to tempt and then kill him. In the church, Michael is confronted by the Unholy, taking form as the woman. She attempts to seduce him, to no avail.

The Unholy then reveals its true form—a monstrous creature—and two mutant creatures crucify Michael. Millie enters the church and is confronted by the creature, but before it can harm her, Michael calls upon God for strength, and damns the Unholy to hell. He collapses, and when he awakens, is blind. As Millie walks him out of the church, the statue begins to weep tears of blood.

== Cast ==
- Ben Cross as Father Michael
- Ned Beatty as Lieutenant Stern
- William Russ as Luke
- Jill Carroll as Millie
- Hal Holbrook as Archbishop Mosely
- Trevor Howard as Father Silva
- Claudia Robinson as Teresa
- Nicole Fortier as Demon
- Peter Frechette as Claude
- Earleen Carey as Lucile
- Lari White as Housekeeper

== Production ==
English actor Ben Cross was cast in the film as the lead of Father Michael; at the time, he was a roommate of Cuban director Camilo Vila, who offered him the role.

Exterior photography was complete in New Orleans, after which the production relocated to Florida, where interiors were filmed.

In crafting the elaborate special effects for the film's conclusion, effects designer Jerry Macaluso was inspired by the Alien queen in the Alien film series. The effects team created a large, thin animatronic creature that stood 10 feet (3.0 m) tall. The film's conclusion, which features a protracted showdown with the demon in the church, was shot with this version of the creature; in the scene, the church's stained glass windows systematically explode before the creature is damned to hell. However, director Vila was unhappy with the creature's appearance on film, after which an alternate version was crafted by a different special effects team; this required that the ending be re-shot under effects supervisor Bob Keen.

== Release ==
The film was released theatrically in the United States by Vestron Pictures in April 1988. It grossed $6,337,299 at the box office.

=== Critical reception ===
Walter Goodman of The New York Times wrote of the film: "Camilo Vila's direction is on the labored side - ponderous movement accompanied by dirgelike music. The photography is as murky as the story, filling the screen with shadows that are periodically blasted by an unilluminating light. There's enough dry ice and tomato sauce laid on to supply a fast-food joint for a couple of years. The theaters may have to be exorcised, or at least aired out". The Washington Post's Richard Harrington wrote in his review of the film: "It's getting so that horror films can be judged by their exit lines. In the case of The Unholy, that line is "take me out of here". By the time it rolls around, most viewers are likely to wish it had cropped up at the beginning of this tedious film that dares to go where everyone has gone before (most recently John Carpenter in Prince of Darkness).

The Unholy holds a 25% rating on Rotten Tomatoes based on eight reviews.

=== Home media ===
The film was released on DVD by Lionsgate in the United Kingdom in 2007. In 2012, Lionsgate has released the film on DVD in North America as part of an 8-horror film set featuring titles from Vestron's catalogue, such as Waxwork (1988), Chopping Mall (1986), Slaughter High (1986), and others.

It was released for the first time on Blu-ray on June 27, 2017, as part of Lionsgate's Vestron Video Collector's Series line; the Blu-ray features three featurettes including cast and crew interviews, the film's original ending, an audio commentary with director Vila, as well as the original theatrical trailer and other promotional material.
