= American Video Entertainment =

American video game company

American Video Entertainment, Inc.
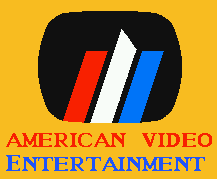
- Type: Subsidiary
- Industry: Video games
- Founded: 1990
- Headquarters: San Jose, California, United States
- Area served: North America
- Products: Video games
- Parent: Macronix

American Video Entertainment, Inc. was an American video game company based in San Jose, California. The company developed unlicensed video games for the Nintendo Entertainment System. The company developed two games on its own, Dudes with Attitude and Trolls on Treasure Island, and published 19 games altogether for the NES.

== Antitrust lawsuit ==
In January 1991, American Video Entertainment filed an antitrust lawsuit against Nintendo of America and its parent company, Nintendo. Seeking US$105 million in damages and filed by antitrust lawyer Joseph Alioto, the suit alleged that Nintendo's use of technology to prevent unlicensed games from running on their Nintendo Entertainment System console violated United States antitrust laws. The lawsuit was settled three years later, under the terms of a secrecy order.

== List of games ==
Game	Details
Blackjack Original release date(s): 1992 (NA)	Release years by system: Nintendo Entertainment System
Blackjack Original release date(s): 1992 (NA)	Notes: Blackjack was developed by Odyssey Software and published by American Video Entertainment. The game features blackjack action and a dealer who deals from 1 to 3 card decks. After winning a certain amount of money or losing it all, the game automatically ends.
Cue Stick Cancellation date: 1992 (NA)	Proposed system release: Nintendo Entertainment System
Cue Stick Cancellation date: 1992 (NA)	Notes: Cue Stick was originally developed by Odyssey Software, and was to be published by American Video Entertainment.
Deathbots Original release date(s): 1990 (NA)	Release years by system: Nintendo Entertainment System
Deathbots Original release date(s): 1990 (NA)	Notes: Deathbots was developed by Odyssey Software and published by American Video Entertainment. In Deathbots, the Mutech Corporation created a base on Alcatraz Island, where attempts to create superior computer intelligence have backfired, as the robots they've created have taken over the computer systems and are threatening the world. Deep in the fortress is an atomic bomb-like device called the Gamma Bomb, which one lone robot must destroy. The game is played from an overhead perspective.
Double Strike Original release date(s): 1989 (AS) 1990 (NA/AUS)	Release years by system: Nintendo Entertainment System
Double Strike Original release date(s): 1989 (AS) 1990 (NA/AUS)	Notes: Double Strike was developed and published in Taiwan by Sachen (original name: 双鷹), in North America by American Video Entertainment, and in Australia by HES. It is a shoot 'em up game in which the player must save a group of islands from terrorists.
Dudes with Attitude Original release date(s): 1990 (NA)	Release years by system: Nintendo Entertainment System
Dudes with Attitude Original release date(s): 1990 (NA)	Notes: Dudes with Attitude is a puzzle game developed and published by American Video Entertainment. The player controls a face-like character called a "Dude" or "Dudette". The object of the game is to collect all the treasures in every level without getting killed by obstacles or running out of time. Players collect treasures by touching them only if they are the same color as the treasures; players can change their color by running over cup-like objects called "attitude converters". The game plays very similarly to Diamonds. The game was developed by Michael Crick and his 12 year-old daughter Camberley ("Cam"), who are the son and granddaughter of Nobel Prize recipient Francis Crick respectively. A freelancer programmer, Michael had most recently worked for Taito from 1990 and 1991, notably designing Indiana Jones and the Last Crusade for the NES. Production on Dudes with Attitude lasted four months with Cam designing and Michael programming. Despite the original version of the game being unlicensed, it was officially re-released on the Famicom by Taiwanese company ITG.Soft on August 1, 2024.
F-15 City War Original release date(s): 1990 (NA/AUS)	Release years by system: Nintendo Entertainment System
F-15 City War Original release date(s): 1990 (NA/AUS)	Notes: F-15 City War is a 3D shoot 'em up game developed by Idea-Tek and published in North America by American Video Entertainment and in Australia by HES. In this game, the player must defend a city under siege by tanks, helicopters, enemy fighter jets, boats, and robots. According to David Sheff's Game Over, the title sold at least 60,000 copies.
Impossible Mission II Original release date(s): 1990 (NA/AUS)	Release years by system: Nintendo Entertainment System
Impossible Mission II Original release date(s): 1990 (NA/AUS)	Notes: Impossible Mission II is a platform game developed by Novotrade for Epyx and published in North America by American Video Entertainment; it was published in Australia by HES. It is the sequel to the Commodore 64 hit Impossible Mission and features similar gameplay as its predecessor. It almost wasn't released due to strict rules with Epyx and Nintendo.
Krazy Kreatures Original release date(s): 1990 (NA)	Release years by system: Nintendo Entertainment System
Krazy Kreatures Original release date(s): 1990 (NA)	Notes: Krazy Kreatures is a puzzle game developed by Bitmasters and published by American Video Entertainment. The player must clear various animals off the screen by arranging them into rows of three or more before the time runs out.
Maxivision 15-in-1 (Maxi 15) Original release date(s): 1992 (NA/AUS)	Release years by system: Nintendo Entertainment System
Maxivision 15-in-1 (Maxi 15) Original release date(s): 1992 (NA/AUS)	Notes: Maxivision 15-in-1 (Maxi 15) is a multicart published in North America by American Video Entertainment and in Australia by HES. It was the last game to be published by AVE, and it featured games published by AVE, American Game Cartridges, and Color Dreams. The 15 games on the multicart are Chiller, Deathbots, Double Strike, Dudes with Attitude, F-15 City Wars, Krazy Kreatures, Menace Beach, Puzzle, Pyramid, Rad Racket: Deluxe Tennis II, Shock Wave, Solitaire, Stakk M, Tiles of Fate, and Venice Beach Volleyball. This game was originally developed to be the Maxivision 30-in-1 (Maxi 30). The 30-in-1 was advertised for sale in an infomercial featuring Hulk Hogan and multiple other popular wrestlers in a faux video game tournament called the Maxivision Power Video Challenge. The infomercial aired exactly once. Due to licensing problems, the number of games had to be cut to 15 after the commercial was aired. Reducing the number of games lowered the memory requirements (and the cost) of the cartridge. In 2025 the Video Game History Foundation digitized a VHS copy of the infomercial which was provided to them by AVE co-founder Richard Frick.
Mermaids of Atlantis Original release date(s): 1991 (NA/AS)	Release years by system: Nintendo Entertainment System
Mermaids of Atlantis Original release date(s): 1991 (NA/AS)	Notes: Mermaids of Atlantis is a puzzle game published by AVE as a clean version of the pornographic NES game Magic Bubble originally developed by Taiwanese developer C&E. The original pornographic version was also published in the United States as Bubble Bath Babes by Panesian, and in Japan by Hacker International as Soap Panic. The object is to clear groups of colored bubbles as they float to the top of the screen.
Puzzle Original release date(s): 1990 (NA)	Release years by system: Nintendo Entertainment System
Puzzle Original release date(s): 1990 (NA)	Notes: Puzzle is a sliding puzzle video game developed by Idea-Tek and published by AVE. The game consists of 10 different 4-by-4 sliding puzzles in which the player must solve in a limited amount of time. Players can receive limited help if they are stuck at any point during a puzzle.
Pyramid Original release date(s): 1992 (NA) 1990 (AS)	Release years by system: Nintendo Entertainment System; Watara Supervision (1992)
Pyramid Original release date(s): 1992 (NA) 1990 (AS)	Notes: Pyramid is a puzzle game developed by Sachen and published in Taiwan by Sachen and in North America by AVE. It is similar to Tetris, except that the blocks are triangle-shaped instead of square.
Rad Racket: Deluxe Tennis II Original release date(s): 1991 (NA)	Release years by system: Nintendo Entertainment System
Rad Racket: Deluxe Tennis II Original release date(s): 1991 (NA)	Notes: Rad Racket: Deluxe Tennis II is a tennis game developed by Idea-Tek and published by AVE in 1991.
Solitaire Original release date(s): 1992 (NA)	Release years by system: Nintendo Entertainment System
Solitaire Original release date(s): 1992 (NA)	Notes: Solitaire was developed by Odyssey Software and released by AVE; it is based on Microsoft Solitaire and the card game of the same name.
Tiles of Fate Original release date(s): 1990 (NA)	Release years by system: Nintendo Entertainment System
Tiles of Fate Original release date(s): 1990 (NA)	Notes: Tiles of Fate is a puzzle game developed by Taiwanese developer C&E (original title: 戰國四川省), and published in the United States by AVE. The player must restore order in Ancient China by matching similar tiles used by Ancient Kings. Similar to the game Mahjong, the player must clear tiles from the screen by matching them side by side in pairs.
Trolls on Treasure Island Original release date(s): 1992 (NA)	Release years by system: Nintendo Entertainment System
Trolls on Treasure Island Original release date(s): 1992 (NA)	Notes: Trolls on Treasure Island was developed and published by AVE in 1992. The game is exactly the same as Dudes with Attitude but player controls a troll instead of a face, and the puzzles are slightly different. It was developed by father and daughter team Michael and Camberley Crick, who also worked on Dudes With Attitude. Initially designed as a true sequel to that game, titled Dudes With Attitude II, it was intended to be released on the Maxivision 30 cartridge. However, it was cut when the compilation was reduced from 30 games down to 15 and the graphics were retooled with the troll doll aesthetic.
Ultimate League Soccer Original release date(s): 1991 (AS) 1992 (NA/AUS)	Release years by system: Nintendo Entertainment System
Ultimate League Soccer Original release date(s): 1991 (AS) 1992 (NA/AUS)	Notes: Ultimate League Soccer is a soccer game developed by Taiwanese developer C&E. Apart from the United States and Taiwan, it was also published in Australia by Home Entertainment Suppliers and in Brazil by Milmar (under the name "Futebol"). A version with pornographic content added was published in Japan by Hacker International.
Venice Beach Volleyball Original release date(s): 1991 (NA)	Release years by system: Nintendo Entertainment System
Venice Beach Volleyball Original release date(s): 1991 (NA)	Notes: Venice Beach Volleyball is a volleyball game developed by Idea-Tek and published in the United States by AVE. The player is in the semifinals of the Venice Beach Open volleyball tournament, with two of the teams consisting of men and the other two consisting of women.
Wally Bear and the NO! Gang Original release date(s): 1992 (NA)	Release years by system: Nintendo Entertainment System
Wally Bear and the NO! Gang Original release date(s): 1992 (NA)	Notes: Wally Bear and the NO! Gang is a platform game developed by American Game Cartridges and published by AVE. The game is a side-scroller, with an anti-drug and alcohol message. The game was designed in cooperation with, and endorsed by, the American Medical Association and the National Clearinghouse for Alcohol and Drug Information.
