= Isabella Rice =

American child actress (born 2006)

- Born: Isabella Kai Rice; September 13, 2006 (age 19); Los Angeles, California, US
- Occupation: Actress
- Years active: 2013–present
- Notable work: Pretty Little Liars

Isabella Kai Rice (born September 13, 2006) is an American former child actress, best known for her role of young Alison DiLaurentis in the series Pretty Little Liars and Sarah Compton in True Blood.

== Career ==
In 2014, Rice played the role of Sarah Compton, Bill Compton's daughter in the season 7 of the HBO's fantasy horror series True Blood. Later, she appeared in the season 5 and 6 of the ABC Family's teen drama series Pretty Little Liars. She played the role of young Alison DiLaurentis, originally played by Sasha Pieterse.

Rice has played the role of young Jerrica Benton in the 2015 musical fantasy film Jem and the Holograms, which was directed by Jon M. Chu.

Rice portrayed Lily in the female-centric thriller film Unforgettable (2017), along with Katherine Heigl, Rosario Dawson, and Geoff Stults for Warner Bros.

== Filmography ==
=== Film ===
| Year | Title | Role | Notes |
|---|---|---|---|
| 2015 | Kidnapped: The Hannah Anderson Story | Becca McKinnon | |
| 2015 | Jem and the Holograms | Young Jerrica Benton | |
| 2015 | Asomatous | Sophie Gibbs | |
| 2017 | Unforgettable | Lily | |
| 2019 | Our Friend | Molly | |

=== Television ===
| Year | Title | Role | Notes |
|---|---|---|---|
| 2013 | Glee | Girl | 1 episode |
| 2014 | Two and a Half Men | Kid #5 | 1 episode |
| 2014 | True Blood | Young Sarah Compton | 3 episodes |
| 2014–15 | Pretty Little Liars | Young Alison DiLaurentis | 2 episodes |
| 2016 | Dr. Ken | Emma | Episode: "Dave's Valentine" |
| 2016 | Castle | Little Girl | Episode: "The Blame Game" |
| 2018 | My Dead Ex | Ten Year Old Charley | 5 episodes |
| 2019 | Sydney to the Max | Hailey | 2 episodes |
