= Born in China =

- Theatrical release poster
- Traditional Chinese: 我們誕生在中國
- Simplified Chinese: 我们诞生在中国
- Directed by: Lu Chuan
- Screenplay by: David Fowler; Brian Leith; Phil Chapman; Lu Chuan
- Produced by: Roy Conli; Brian Leith; Phil Chapman
- Narrated by: John Krasinski (American release); Zhou Xun (Chinese release); Claire Keim (French release)
- Edited by: Matthew Meech
- Music by: Barnaby Taylor
- Production companies: Disneynature; Shanghai Media Group; Chuan Films; Brian Leith Productions
- Distributed by: Walt Disney Studios Motion Pictures; Shanghai Media Group (China)
- Release dates: August 12, 2016 (China); April 21, 2017 (United States); August 23, 2017 (France)
- Running time: 76 minutes
- Countries: United States; China; France
- Languages: English; Mandarin; French
- Budget: $5–10 million
- Box office: $25.1 million

Born in China (Chinese: 我们诞生在中国) is a 2016 nature documentary film directed by Lu Chuan. A co-production between Disneynature and Shanghai Media Group, the film was released in China on August 12, 2016, in the United States on April 21, 2017, one day before Earth Day, and in France on August 23 of the same year. The film focuses on a snow leopard named Dawa and her cubs, a young golden snub-nosed monkey named Tao Tao, a female giant panda named Ya Ya along with her daughter Mei Mei, and a herd of chiru. The American release of the film is narrated by John Krasinski, the Chinese release is narrated by Zhou Xun, and the French release is narrated by Claire Keim.

== Plot ==
The film follows four animal families through the course of a year in the wilds of China: the giant panda, the snow leopard, the golden snub-nosed monkey, & the chiru antelope.

=== Dawa ===
In the Qinghai Plateau in western China, lives a mother snow leopard named Dawa, who has two cubs. Dawa struggles to keep her cubs safe from danger, like a rival snow leopard, who is encountered & easily driven off in spring, but soon returns in fall with three of his sons and attacks Dawa, but she cannot chase all off and allows them to stay. Winter approaches and Dawa tries hunting a sheep but is injured. A year goes by, and in the spring, she dies from being charged at by a domestic yak while trying to hunt down its baby, while Dawa's cubs live together without their mother.

=== TaoTao ===
In the Sichuan mountain valleys of central China, lives a young golden snub-nosed monkey named TaoTao, who is jealous of his newborn baby sister, but to make matters worse, his parents start to neglect and reject him. TaoTao soon befriends a group of young outcast monkeys called "The Lost Boys", led by an adult male monkey named Rooster, but after the leader gets into a fight with TaoTao's father in autumn, the young monkey himself abandons the Lost Boys and rejoins his family in winter. At first, they won't let him in, but decide to bring him into their warm arms. When spring approaches, TaoTao spends more time by himself and less time around his family, but when a Goshawk is about to catch his sister, TaoTao comes to the rescue and is welcomed back into his family's arms.

=== YaYa ===
In a lush bamboo forest on the other side of the mountain, lives YaYa the giant panda and her new daughter MeiMei. The baby becomes fascinated by the wonders of their home, but YaYa is overprotective for her, knowing that danger can be by at any moment. Time passes, and MeiMei grows into a healthy young Panda. She dreams of climbing a tree after noticing a red panda. MeiMei soon becomes a young adult, and in the spring, she successfully climbs a tall tree for the first time. Proud of her daughter, YaYa knows that it's time to say goodbye, and departs into the forest.

=== Chiru ===
Up in the higher elevations of western China, a herd of chiru antelope live on the plains near the Qinghai Plateau. Every spring, the females leave for Zhuonai Lake in the uplands to raise their young, while the males are left behind. After the young are ready for the journey home in autumn, they set for home & their fathers, while having to face wolf threats that want to eat the young. Upon return, the mating season restarts, as the males & females cannot identify their mates & young after being distanced from each other for 2 seasons.

=== Epilogue ===
The narrator says that, in Chinese mythology, when one life ends, a red-crowned crane carries that soul, to rejoin the cycle of birth and rebirth. The film ends with the animals living their own lives. Dawa's cubs remain in the mountains, playing with each other, TaoTao and his father take a walk in the river, a giant panda (possibly YaYa) has another baby, and a chiru spends his days running and impressing a mate, growing every day.

== Reception ==
=== Box office ===
As of June 2017, Born in China has grossed $13.8 million in the United States and Canada and $10.1 million in other territories for a worldwide gross of $23.9 million.

In the United States and Canada, Born in China opened alongside The Promise, Unforgettable, Free Fire, and Phoenix Forgotten, and was projected to gross around $5 million from 1,508 theaters in its opening weekend. It ended up debuting at $4.7 million, finishing 6th at the box office.

The film made US$2.3 million on its opening weekend at the Chinese box office. It went on to gross a total of CN¥68 million ($9.9 million) in the country.

=== Critical response ===
On the review aggregator website Rotten Tomatoes, the film has an approval rating of 83% based on 48 reviews, with an average rating of 6.90/10. The site's consensus reads: "Disneynature Born In China delivers more of the breathtaking footage the series is known for — and more than enough cuddly anthropomorphic action to keep the kids entertained". On Metacritic the film has a score of 57 out of 100, based on 14 critics, indicating "mixed or average" reviews. Audiences polled by CinemaScore gave the film an average grade of "A−" on an A+ to F scale.

== Accolades ==
The film received a nomination for Best Documentary at the 2017 Golden Rooster Awards.

== See also ==
- The Amazing Panda Adventure, a 1995 American adventure film that follows a 10-year-old American boy who travels to China and has to take a panda cub to the reserve so it can reunite with its mother
