= Diamonds (video game) =

1992 video game

- Developers: Dub Myers; Oliver Dreer
- Publisher: Varcon Systems
- Platforms: Classic Mac OS, Apple IIGS
- Release: 1992
- Genre: Action
- Mode: Single-player

Diamonds is an action game released for Classic Mac OS in 1992 by Varcon Systems.

== Gameplay ==
The goal of Diamonds is to achieve a high score while completing as many levels as possible before running out of lives, or ultimately to complete the last level of the game.

The first level

During the game there is a small ball constantly bouncing up and down on the screen, similar to Breakout. However, unlike the paddle in Breakout, the player can directly control the left and right motion of the ball using the arrow keys on the keyboard. In fact, this is the only control the player has over the game.

To complete a level, all blocks with diamond symbols must be cleared away by bouncing the ball against them. However, before the diamond blocks can be destroyed, all solid color blocks must be removed by bouncing the ball off each block while the ball matches the color of the particular block. Among the various types of blocks are "brush" blocks, which alter the color of the bouncing ball when it makes contact with them, and skull blocks which cost the player one life.

When beginning a level or after losing a life, the ball is initially light blue. The player needs to then eliminate all light blue blocks first because there are no light blue brushes to return the ball to that color. Therefore, if the ball's color is changed while light blue blocks remain, the only way to change the ball back to light blue is to intentionally lose a life.

== Ports ==
In 1993 a port was written for the Apple IIGS by Richard Bennett and Sean Craig, however it sat in limbo due to licensing issues with Varcon Systems. After much delay and failure to have it licensed, it was publicly leaked by beta tester Joe Kohn in 1996.

== Legacy ==
Varcon Systems licensed MacSoft to release Diamonds and More Diamonds in 1994. The significant change to this new version was the addition of forty new levels after the original thirty. MacSoft also produced a three-dimensional edition of the game, Diamonds 3D, in 1995. Diamonds 3D received a score of 4 out of 5 from MacUser.

Several years afterwards, a pseudo-sequel entitled Diamonds for Kids was released as part of the compilation disc "Kid's Arcade Pack" produced by WizardWorks. It has lower difficulty than its predecessor and slight graphical adjustments to accompany a smaller play field.

In 1993, a clone under the name of Go Bonkers was released for the Sega Genesis as part of the Action 52 multicart by Active Enterprises.
