= Hacker International =

Japanese video game company

An issue of Hacker magazine

Hacker International was a Japanese video game company that developed and published games from 1990 to 2001 for various home consoles, including Nintendo's Famicom (including Famicom Disk System), NEC's PC Engine (including PC Engine CD), Sony's PlayStation (as Map Japan) consoles, and Microsoft Windows PCs. The company was known for its play-for-porn approach to gaming, with such games as AV Pachi-Slot (Hot Slots) and Soap Panic (Magic Bubble) featuring female nudity as a reward for skilful playing. These games were usually distributed through mail order and sold approximately 30,000 to 50,000 copies each. Many of their games were developed by Taiwanese companies and were released in non-pornographic form elsewhere in the world; however, three were released in the United States for the Nintendo Entertainment System with pornography intact (albeit sometimes modified to "Westernise" the girls' features) by another Taiwanese company, Panesian.

The Hacker name was first used by Satoru Hagiwara, an entrepreneur and former music producer, for a monthly PC magazine. Hacker International was founded by Hagiwara as an outlet for its writers' ideas; its first product was the Hacker Junior, an upgrade for Famicom systems that provided composite video output and turbo controllers, for which they were sued by Nintendo and eventually settled out of court. The company was also known for the Disk Hacker software which allowed users to copy Famicom Disk System disks using only an ordinary Disk System (as opposed to the official method of using Nintendo's authorised Disk Writer units, which were placed only in game stores and charged 500 yen to copy a selected game to a customer's disk). Several versions were released to combat successive anti-piracy measures introduced by Nintendo.

None of Hacker's games, with the exception of their 15 PlayStation titles, were licensed by the respective console manufacturers; Hiroshi Yamauchi personally opposed pornographic content in Famicom games, believing they would tarnish Nintendo's reputation. When Tokuma Shoten's Family Computer Magazine published advertisements for Hacker's games, it felt its relationship with Nintendo—which it relied on for preview materials—was so threatened that five of Tokuma's top executives travelled to Nintendo to apologise to Yamauchi in person. However, NEC was more tolerant of Hacker's PC Engine releases (under the Games Express brand) and actually thanked Hacker for helping console sales. Hacker became a licensee for the PlayStation under the name Map Japan, releasing 15 games, but eventually closed in 2001 due to competition from other publishers and Hagiwara's own loss of interest in gaming.

Hacker's relationship to other Japanese adult console game producers of the era, such as Super Pig and MIMI Pro, is debated. For example, in the case of Super Pig, some claim this is merely a pseudonym under which Hacker published Disk System games while others maintain it is an entirely separate company that only occasionally worked with Hacker.

== Games ==
=== Famicom ROM cartridge ===
Title	Screen title	Developer	Alternate versions (pornographic)	Alternate versions (non-pornographic)	Year
AV Poker	Poker	Idea-Tek	Peek-A-Boo Poker (Panesian, U.S.); Pūkè Jīnglíng (Idea-Tek, TW)	—	1990
Idol Shisen Mahjong	—	C&E	—	Tiles of Fate (American Video Entertainment, U.S.); Zhànguó Sìchuān Shěng (C&E, TW)	1990
Mahjong Companion	—	Thin Chen Enterprise	—	Mahjong Partner (Thin Chen Enterprise, TW)	1990
Mahjong Summit Kabuchiko Hen	—	Thin Chen Enterprise	—	The Mahjong World (Thin Chen Enterprise, TW)	1990
Pyramid Cleopatra Kiki Ippatsu	Pyramid	Thin Chen Enterprise	—	Pyramid (Sachen, TW; American Video Entertainment, U.S.)	1990
Shisen Mahjong: Seifuku Hen	—	Joy Van	—	Mahjong Trap (Joy Van, TW); Mahjong Trap Plus (Sachen, TW)	1990
AV Dragon Mahjang	—	Idea-Tek	—	Mahjong Block (Idea-Tek/TXC, TW) [On-screen title Majohn Block]; Poke Block (Idea-Tek/TXC, TW); Stakk'M (American Video Entertainment, U.S.)	1991
AV Mahjong Club	—	C&E	—	AV Mahjong Club (C&E, TW)	1991
AV Pachi Slot: Big Chance	—	Idea-Tek	Hot Slots (Panesian, U.S.) [On-screen title Hot Slot: Big Chance]	—	1991
AV Super Real Pachinko	AV Pachinko	C&E	—	—	1991
AV World Soccer	AV Soccer	C&E	—	Ultimate League Soccer (American Video Entertainment, U.S.); Soccer (Magexa, EU); Futebol (Milmar, BR)	1991
Hanafuda Yūkyōde Nagarebana Oryu	—	C&E	—	—	1991
Hayama Reiko: Katsuragi Mayako no AV Hanafuda Club	AV Hanafuda Club	Idea-Tek	—	—	1991
Miss Peach World	Miss Peach World I: Super LA Cop	Color Dreams	Mr. Assy (unreleased prototype)	Menace Beach (Color Dreams, U.S.); Sunday Funday (Wisdom Tree, U.S.)	1991
Soap Panic	—	C&E	Bubble Bath Babes (Panesian, U.S.); Magic Bubble (C&E, TW)	Mermaids of Atlantis (American Video Entertainment, U.S.)	1991

=== Famicom Disk System ===
- Bodyconquest I (Credited on-screen to Indies Soft)
- Bishoujo SF Alien Battle

==== Super Pig games ====
- Sexy Invaders
- Bishoujo Sexy Derby
- Bishoujo Sexy Slot
- Moero Yakyuuken
- Gal's Dungeon: Yakyuuken Part II

=== PC Engine HuCard ===
All games branded Games Express.

- 1991 - Idol Hanafuda Fan Club
- 1992 - AV Poker World Gambler
- 1992 - PC Pachi-Slot Idol Gambler
- 1992 - Lady Sword
- 1992 - Kyuukyoku Mahjong Idol Graphic
- 1993 - Strip Fighter II
- 1993 - Bodyconquest II
- 1993 - Kyuukyoku Mahjong Idol Graphic II
- 1994 - Quiz Toukou Shashin

=== PC Engine CD ===
All games branded Games Express, require Games Express System Card.

- 1993 - CD Mahjong Bishoujo Chuushinha
- 1994 - Hi-Leg Fantasy
- 1994 - CD Pachislot Bishojo Gambler
- 1994 - CD Hanafuda Bishoujo Fan Club
- 1994 - CD Bishoujo Pachinko: Kyuuma Yon Shimai
- 1995 - AV Tanjou
- 1995 - Bishoujo Janshi Idol Pai

== See also ==
- American Video Entertainment
- Adult video game
