= Death Racers =

2008 American film

- DVD cover
- Directed by: Roy Knyrim
- Written by: Andrew Helm; Roy Knyrim; Patrick Tantalo
- Produced by: David Michael Latt; Paul Bales; Rachael Goldenberg; David Rimawi; Gregory Paul Smith
- Starring: Violent J; Shaggy 2 Dope; Raven; Stephen Blackehart
- Cinematography: David Conley
- Edited by: Bobby K. Richardson
- Music by: Joseph Kamiya
- Distributed by: The Asylum
- Release date: September 16, 2008
- Running time: 92 minutes
- Country: United States
- Language: English
- Budget: $450,000 (est.)

Death Racers is a 2008 American action film directed by Roy Knyrim. Considered a mockbuster of the film Death Race (released that same year), Death Racers follows teams of criminals competing in a deadly, over-the-top racing event in a dystopian United States. It stars the hip hop duo Insane Clown Posse and professional wrestler Scott "Raven" Levy, and was released direct-to-video by The Asylum.

== Plot ==
In the year 2030, a civil war breaks out in the United States. In a final attempt to restore order, the president declares martial law. In 2033, a massive prison camp known as "the Red Zone" is built in a desolate city that soon holds over one million insane and violent felons. The US is declared safe.

A dangerous criminal known as the Reaper has been extracting sarin, which he plans to spill into the nation's water supply. One of the prisoners, FX, secretly films the Reaper with a Wi-Fi digital camera as he discusses these plans, and the state's governor, Reagan Black finds out about them. Black develops a plan to hold a "death race" within the prison system, assembling four teams of racers:

- The Severed Head Gang, consisting of Danny Satanico and Fred "The Hammer", two members of the largest gang in the US, known for decapitating their enemies. The team is given a customized 1995 town car.
- Homeland Security, consisting of Colonel Bob and Captain Rudy Jackson, formerly honored, but now disgraced members of the United States Army. The team is given a vintage 1943 Willys MB.
- Vaginamyte, consisting of Double-Dee Destruction and Queen B, two serial killers who seduced and murdered over 72 male and female victims. The team is given a yellow Lotus Elise with a black widow spider design.
- Insane Clown Posse (Violent J and Shaggy 2 Dope), whose violent form of hip hop was attributed as indirectly influencing multiple murders, acts of terrorism and a school massacre which resulted in the rappers being convicted for these murders and being dubbed as "the Charles Manson of their time". Although the group's music has been banned, it continues to retain a strong fanbase. Violent J and Shaggy 2 Dope are given an ice cream truck customized with a meat grinder, machine guns and "all the bling-bling these two Detroit locals could find".

The race is televised live, hosted by anchors Harvey Winkler and Jennifer Ramirez. Black offers the teams gathering points for killing loose prisoners, promising freedom to the team that brings back the Reaper—dead or alive. When Danny Satanico suggests that the four teams escape, Black reveals that each team member has a chip implanted in their bodies which would kill any member that breaks the rules, using Satanico to demonstrate.

When Insane Clown Posse's truck gets a flat tire, a fight ensues between the teams and loose criminals. In the distance, Violent J witnesses an explosion. The teams investigate, finding the burning Homeland Security jeep with two corpses inside. Violent J and Shaggy 2 Dope find FX filming the race. He tells them that there will be an ambush at their first destination, and they let him ride in their van. Each of the teams work together to surprise and kill the ambushers. Metal Machine Man, under the order of the Reaper, kills FX and attacks the racers before being hit by missiles fired by a pair of mysterious men.

The teams fix their cars before dispatching. Violent J and Shaggy 2 Dope arrive at the Reaper's lair, and successfully infiltrate the fortress, preventing the Reaper and his henchmen from releasing the sarin into the water. The mysterious men arrive, firing a rocket into the room, and reveal themselves to be Colonel Bob and Captain Rudy, who were hired by Governor Black as inside men, and faked their deaths to convince the other teams that they had a chance of winning.

Believing the Reaper died in the explosion, Bob and Rudy retrieve his severed hand and leave in Insane Clown Posse's truck. Violent J and Shaggy 2 Dope emerge from the rubble. Because Violent J is injured, Shaggy 2 Dope goes after Bob and Rudy alone. The Reaper appears and attempts to release the sarin as Violent J attempts to stop him. The Homeland Security team members arrive at the finish line, presenting the Reapers hand to Governor Black. Shaggy 2 Dope rises from the back of the truck, shooting at Bob, Rudy and the governor. Black presses the button to activate the explosives in the bodies of the Insane Clown Posse team members. The sarin explodes, causing a chain reaction which destroys the country.

== Cast ==
- Joseph Bruce as "Violent J"
- Joseph Utsler as "Shaggy 2 Dope"
- Scott Levy (credited as Raven) as "The Reaper"
- Jason Ellefson as Fred "The Hammer"
- Jennifer Elizabeth Keith as "Double-Dee Destruction"
- Thereese as "Queen B"
- Dean Kreyling as Dr. Shank
- Robert Pike Daniel as Governor Reagan Black
- Stephen Blackehart as Harvey Winkler
- Damien Puckler as Metal Machine Man
- Dustin Fitzsimons as "FX"
- Jesse Pate as Dr. Samualson
- Caroline Attwood as Jennifer Ramirez
- Rick Benedetto as Rudy Jackson
- Koco Limbevski as Danny Satanico
- Paolo Carascon as Colonel Bob
- Anya Benton as "Babylonian Temptress"

== Production ==
In January 2008, it was announced that Insane Clown Posse and Twiztid had received a treatment for a low-budget horror film titled Road Rage, to be directed by Roy Knyrim of Sota Productions, who had previously directed J and Shaggy in The Chronicles of the Dark Carnival. It was stated that filming would take place over a two-week period in Los Angeles, California during the Spring of that year.

In March, a second announcement was made, stating that Insane Clown Posse would star in a film scheduled to begin production in the first week of May. Bruce and Utsler would portray their stage personas of Violent J and Shaggy 2 Dope, and the characters would drive around in an ice cream truck, killing pedestrians for points. It was stated that the film would be aired by the Sci Fi Channel in the summer.

Insane Clown Posse members Violent J and Shaggy 2 Dope agreed to appear in the film because the director was a personal friend, and they wanted to warm up their acting skills for Big Money Rustlas, the prequel to the Psychopathic Records film Big Money Hustlas. Psychopathic was not involved with the production of Death Racers in any way. According to Bruce, "We just did it for fun. We knew it was gonna be basically garbage."

Death Racers was released direct-to-video by The Asylum on September 16, 2008. The film's soundtrack featured original music by Joseph Kamiya, in addition to previously released music performed by Insane Clown Posse.

== Reception ==
Dread Central said, "If you’re a die hard Juggalo or think Troma is the pinnacle of cinema, then maybe Death Racers will rock your socks off. Me, I wanted my time, my money, and my brain cells back."

== Legacy ==
Violent J referred to Death Racers as "a terribly shitty movie", but states that he does not regret making the film, because it inspired him to continue with the production of Big Money Rustlas, because he felt that Psychopathic could make a better film than Death Racers. At the 2008 Gathering of the Juggalos, J referred to the film as "the bootleg ripoff fake version" of Death Race.
