= Bob Cicherillo =

American IFBB professional bodybuilder

- Professional bodybuilder

Personal info
- Born: December 1, 1965 (age 60); Rochester, New York, U.S.

Best statistics
- Height: 6 ft 0 in (1.83 m)
- Weight: 260 lb (118 kg) (contest); 280 lb (127 kg) (off-season)

Professional (Pro) career
- Pro-debut: NPC USA Championships; 2000
- Best win: IFBB Masters Pro World; 2006
- Active: Since 1981

Robert Michael Cicherillo (born December 1, 1965) is an American IFBB professional bodybuilder.

== Biography ==
Cicherillo's first bodybuilding competition was the 1981 Natural America, where he placed 4th in the teen tall class. His first NPC (National Physique Committee) event was the 1987 NPC Junior Nationals, where he won in the heavyweight class division. His first IFBB event was the IFBB North American championships, where he placed 4th. His first IFBB Night of Champions was in 2001, where he placed 11th. A year later he was competing at the Night of Champions too, where he was losing to Markus Rühl. His first Mr. Olympia came the following year in 2002, where he placed 17th (equal last).

Cicherillo is the co-host of the radio show and podcast Pro Bodybuilding Weekly with Dan Solomon, he recently left bodybuilding.com and joined BSN. He qualified for the 2006 Olympia by winning the 2006 Masters in New York but elected not to compete instead serving as host/emcee of the various Olympia contests.

Bob Cicherillo has been featured in many fitness and magazine articles, as well as being featured on the cover of the Flex magazine. He once appeared in the television sitcom Malcolm in the Middle and is a regular contributor to the fitness website Bodybuilding.com. In addition, Cicherillo has appeared in an ESPN SportsCenter commercial with Stuart Scott, a music video for the "You Are My Number One" song by the band Smash Mouth, and in the 2004 movie Dodgeball: A True Underdog Story, playing Rory, a bodybuilder at Ben Stiller's gym. He is also a member of the Screen Actors Guild. Chicherillo was also "Titan" on the original American Gladiators TV series.

== Competition History ==
- 1981 Natural America, Teen Tall, 4th
- 1983 AAU Mr New York State, Teen Tall, 1st and Overall
- 1987 NPC Junior Nationals, HeavyWeight, 1st and Overall
- 1987 NPC Nationals, Heavyweight, 5th
- 1988 NPC USA Championships, Heavyweight, 8th
- 1989 NPC Nationals, Heavyweight, 4th
- 1989 North American Championships, Heavyweight, 4th
- 1989 NPC USA Championships, Heavyweight, 2nd
- 1990 NPC Nationals, Light-Heavyweight, 5th
- 1993 NPC USA Championships, Heavyweight, 8th
- 1995 NPC USA Championships, Heavyweight, 15th
- 1996 NPC Nationals, Heavyweight, 8th
- 1999 NPC Nationals, Heavyweight, 2nd
- 2000 NPC USA Championships, Super-Heavyweight, 1st and Overall
- 2001 Night of Champions, 11th
- 2001 Toronto Pro Invitational, 5th
- 2002 Night of Champions, 2nd
- 2002 Mr. Olympia, 18th
- 2002 Show of Strength Pro Championship, 7th
- 2002 Southwest Pro Cup, 2nd
- 2003 Night of Champions, 6th
- 2004 Arnold Classic, 11th
- 2004 Ironman Pro Invitational, 8th
- 2005 New York Pro Championships, 8th
- 2005 San Francisco Pro Invitational, 9th
- 2006 Masters Pro World, 1st

== See also ==
- List of male professional bodybuilders
- List of female professional bodybuilders
- Mr. Olympia
- Arnold Classic
