= Cemetery Gates (film) =

- Promotional release poster
- Directed by: Roy Knyrim
- Screenplay by: Brian Patrick O'Toole
- Story by: Pat Coburn; J. Victor Renaud
- Produced by: David E. Allen
- Starring: Reggie Bannister; Peter Stickles; Aime Wolf
- Cinematography: Steve Adcock
- Edited by: Christopher Roth
- Music by: Ben Cooper; Marcus Andexler
- Release date: May 30, 2006
- Running time: 88 minutes
- Country: United States
- Language: English
- Budget: $600,000 (est.)

Cemetery Gates is a 2006 American horror film directed by Roy Knyrim and starring Reggie Bannister, Peter Stickles, and Aime Wolf. The film's plot concerns a genetically mutated Tasmanian devil that stalks a cemetery.

== Plot ==
After breaking into a laboratory facility in order to free the animals kept there for experiments, two environmental activists unleash a genetically mutated Tasmanian devil from its cage. Fleeing from the facility, the creature begins hunting in a nearby cemetery, killing anyone and anything it comes across.

== Cast ==
- Reggie Bannister as Belmont
- Peter Stickles as Hunter Belmont
- Aime Wolf as Dr. Christine Kollar
- Nicole DuPort as Kym
- Kristin Novak as August
- Ky Evans as Tony
- John Thomas as Enrique
- Chris Finch as Matt
- Karol Garrison as Earl Martin
- Bill Lloyd as John Martin
- G. Scott McDonald as Ben
- Stephen Van Dorn as Alex
- Howard Berger as Stoner Dude Doug
- Greg Nicotero as Stoner Dude Michael
- Richard Elfman as Ed the Fisherman (as Aristide Sumatra)
- Brad Carlson as Brad

== Production ==
Over ten years before Cemetery Gates was filmed, screenwriter Brian Patrick O'Toole, received a script for the film from Pat Coburn and J. Victor Renauld. O'Toole, who was working as a literary agent at the time, "loved" the idea of a Tasmanian devil as an antagonist, stating: "My feeling was, 'Why hasn't anybody thought of this before—a mutant Tasmanian devil?' It's the most pissed-off, vicious creature on the planet." O'Toole noted that a close childhood friend of his, Michael Beck, died one day before O'Toole received the script, and said that, "most importantly, this was a movie Michael and I would have loved."

Throughout the next decade, the script for Cemetery Gates went through a number of different drafts and storylines. The final draft of the script was written in four days over the Thanksgiving holiday in 2003. Filming took place over a period of 13 days; shooting locations included the Bronson Caves in Los Angeles, California.

== Release ==
=== Home media ===
On May 30, 2006, Cemetery Gates was released on DVD by Kismet Entertainment, Graveyard Filmworks, and Ventura.
