= Phoenix Lights =

1997 light phenomenon over Arizona, US

A drawing that appeared in USA Today, June 18, 1997

The Phoenix Lights (sometimes called the "Lights Over Phoenix") were a series of widely sighted unidentified flying objects observed in the skies over the southwestern U.S. states of Arizona and Nevada on March 13, 1997.

Lights of varying descriptions were seen between 7:30–10:30 p.m. MST, in a space of about 300 miles (480 km), from the Nevada line, through Phoenix, to the edge of Tucson. Some witnesses described seeing what appeared to be a huge carpenter's square-shaped UFO containing five spherical lights. There were two distinct events involved in the incident: a triangular formation of lights seen to pass over the state, and a series of stationary lights seen in the Phoenix area.

Both sightings were due to aircraft participating in Operation Snowbird, a pilot training program operated in winter by the Air National Guard out of Davis-Monthan Air Force Base in Tucson, Arizona. The first light group was later identified as a formation of A-10 Thunderbolt II aircraft flying over Phoenix while returning to Davis-Monthan. The second group of lights were identified by Robert Sheaffer as illumination flares dropped by another flight of A-10 aircraft that were on training exercises at the Barry Goldwater Range in southwest Arizona. Fife Symington, governor of Arizona at the time, years later recounted witnessing the incident, describing it as "otherworldly."

Reports of similar lights arose in 2007 and 2008 and were attributed to military flares dropped by fighter aircraft at Luke Air Force Base, and flares attached to helium balloons released by a civilian, respectively.

== 1997 reports ==
On March 13, 1997, at 7:55 p.m. MST, a witness in Henderson, Nevada, reported seeing a large, V-shaped object traveling southeast. At 8:15 p.m., an unidentified former police officer in Paulden, Arizona, reported seeing a cluster of reddish-orange lights disappear over the southern horizon. Shortly afterward, there were reports of lights seen over the Prescott Valley, Arizona. Tim Ley and his wife Bobbi, his son Hal and his grandson Damien Turnidge first saw the lights when they were about 65 miles (105 km) away from them.

At first, the lights appeared to them as five separate and distinct lights in an arc shape, as if they were on top of a balloon, but they soon realized that the lights appeared to be moving towards them. Over the next ten or so minutes, the lights appeared to come closer, the distance between the lights increased, and they took on the shape of an upside-down V. Eventually when the lights appeared to be a couple of miles away, the family said they could make out a shape that looked like a 60-degree carpenter's square, with the five lights set into it, with one at the front and two on each side.

Soon, the object with the embedded lights appeared to be moving toward them, about 100 to 150 feet (30 to 46 m) above them, traveling so slowly that it gave the appearance of a silent hovering object, which seemed to pass over their heads and went through a V opening in the peaks of the mountain range towards Piestewa Peak Mountain and toward the direction of Phoenix Sky Harbor International Airport. Actor Kurt Russell, an amateur pilot, then reported seeing the lights to air traffic control.

Between 8:30 and 8:45 p.m., witnesses in Glendale, a suburb northwest of Phoenix, saw the light formation pass overhead at an altitude high enough to become obscured by the thin clouds. Amateur astronomer Mitch Stanley in Scottsdale, Arizona, also observed the high altitude lights "flying in formation" through a telescope. According to Stanley, they were quite clearly individual airplanes.

At approximately 10:00 that same evening, a large number of people in the Phoenix area reported seeing "a row of brilliant lights hovering in the sky, or slowly falling". A number of photographs and videos were taken, prompting author Robert Sheaffer to describe it as "perhaps the most widely witnessed UFO event in history".

=== Explanations ===
According to Sheaffer, what became known as "the Phoenix Lights" incident of 1997 "consists of two unrelated incidents, although both were the result of activities of the same organization: Operation Snowbird, a pilot training program operated in the winter by the Air National Guard, out of Davis-Monthan Air Force Base in Tucson, Arizona." Tucson astronomer and retired Air Force pilot James McGaha said he also investigated the two separate sightings and traced them both to A-10 Thunderbolt II aircraft flying in formation at high altitude.

The first incident, often perceived as a large “flying triangle” by witnesses, began at approximately 8:00 p.m., and was due to five A-10 jets from Operation Snowbird following an assigned air traffic corridor and flying under visual flight rules. Federal Aviation Administration (FAA) rules concerning private and commercial aircraft do not apply to military aircraft, so the A-10 formation displayed steady formation lights rather than blinking collision lights. The formation flew over Phoenix and on to Tucson, landing at Davis-Monthan AFB at about 8:45 p.m.

The second incident, described as "a row of brilliant lights hovering in the sky, or slowly falling" began at approximately 10:00 p.m., and was due to a flare drop exercise by different A-10 jets from the Maryland Air National Guard, also operating out of Davis-Monthan AFB as part of Operation Snowbird. The U.S. Air Force explained the exercise as utilizing slow-falling, long-burning LUU-2B/B illumination flares dropped by a flight of four A-10 aircraft on a training exercise at the Barry M. Goldwater Air Force Range in western Pima County, Arizona. The flares would have been visible in Phoenix and appeared to hover due to rising heat from the burning flares creating a "balloon" effect on their parachutes, which slowed the descent. The lights then appeared to wink out as they fell behind the Sierra Estrella mountain range to the southwest of Phoenix. The lights likely appeared to block out background stars because of their brightness, making it harder to see dim objects like stars in the areas they laid out.

A Maryland ANG pilot, Lt. Col. Ed Jones, responding to a March 2007 media query, confirmed that he had flown one of the aircraft in the formation that dropped flares on the night in question. The squadron to which he belonged was at Davis-Monthan AFB on a training exercise at the time, and flew training sorties to the Goldwater Air Force Range on the night in question, according to the Maryland ANG. A history of the Maryland ANG published in 2000 asserted that the squadron, the 104th Fighter Squadron, was responsible for the incident. The first reports that members of the Maryland ANG were responsible for the incident were published in The Arizona Republic in July 1997.

Later comparisons with known military flare drops were reported on local television stations, showing similarities between the known military flare drops and the Phoenix Lights. An analysis of the luminosity of LUU-2B/B illumination flares, the type which would have been in use by A-10 aircraft at the time, determined that the luminosity of such flares at a range of approximately 50–70 miles (80–113 km) would fall well within the range of the lights viewed from Phoenix.

=== Alternate Skeptical Explanation ===
Alternate skeptical explanations were proposed in the years following the incident, one such hypothesis being that the chevron-shaped formation that some eyewitnesses reported observing was instead a large, experimental lighter-than-air craft. Although writer Cassie Peterson, when referencing the "blimp" hypothesis, asserted that "in the 20-plus years since the sightings, no evidence of new aircraft of a design or scale that would fit the descriptions provided by witnesses has come to light", skeptic Ben McGee pointed to a very large, experimental, V-shaped lighter-than-air craft developed by JP Aerospace. In an interview with science journalist Natalie Wolchover, McGee stated his support for the hypothesis that a ship similar to JP Aerospace's design could have been in use by the military:

I would be shocked if the government wasn't using something similar [to the JP Aerospace Ascender], and that's a possible explanation for the Phoenix sighting.

— Ben McGee, geoscientist

In an interview with science journalist Brett Tingley, JP Aerospace's John Powell, while strongly denying that his company was directly involved, could not dismiss the possibility of the involvement of competitors, or of government programs having built off their tech:

Here I must tread a little delicately. We have built several airships and other vehicles for various DOD agencies. None of our programs were classified. However, after completion and delivery, our vehicles entered into programs of which I have no knowledge.
We were testing vehicles at the time of the Phoenix lights incident, however, I can absolutely say that JPA was not, nor [was] our equipment, involved.
There have been times where our vehicles have been sighted and confused for UFOs or other mysterious things. I have also seen images of great vee-shaped objects in the sky that I can say for sure were not mine, but I could note perhaps the tech of a competitor. This is all speculation.

— John Powell, founder of JP Aerospace

Referencing Powell's interview, journalist Greg Haas highlighted reports that were authored by the RAND Corporation and the Department of Defense, which suggested official interest in similar lighter-than-air vehicles. One such report includes discussion of a V-shaped airship called the Near-Space Maneuvering Vehicle (NSMV); the document reports:

The NSMV was a concept developed by JP Aerospace for the Air Force Space Battle Lab (SBL). The program utilized technology based on JP Aerospace's Ascender vehicle. The vehicle consists of two large cylindrical balloons connected on one end to form a 175 ft. V-shaped vehicle (Figure 59). The payload and propulsion system were suspended between the two cylinders. The program objective was to provide a communications relay platform at altitudes above 65,000 feet. The program encountered technical problems with the propulsion system, which caused redesigns and failed launches. The Air Force decided to end the program in 2005.

— Office of the Assistant Secretary of Defense for Research and Engineering, Rapid Reaction Technology Office

=== Photos and videos ===
External videos
- Video of Phoenix Lights

During the Phoenix event, numerous still photographs and videotapes were made showing a series of lights appearing at a regular interval, remaining illuminated for several moments, and then going out. The images were later determined to be the result of mountains not visible by night that partially obstructed the view of aircraft flares from certain angles to create the illusion of an arc of lights appearing and disappearing one by one.

== Governor's response ==
Shortly after the 1997 incident, Arizona Governor Fife Symington III held a press conference, joking that "they found who was responsible" and revealing an aide dressed in an alien costume. Later, in 2007, Symington reportedly told a UFO investigator he'd had a personal close encounter with an alien spacecraft but remained silent "because he didn't want to panic the populace". According to Symington, "I'm a pilot and I know just about every machine that flies. It was bigger than anything that I've ever seen. It remains a great mystery. Other people saw it, responsible people... I don't know why people would ridicule it".

== Later reports ==
Lights were reported by observers and recorded by the local Fox News television station on February 6, 2007. According to military officials and the FAA, these were flares dropped by F-16 "Fighting Falcon" aircraft training at Luke Air Force Base.

On April 21, 2008, lights were reported over Phoenix by local residents. These lights reportedly appeared to change from square to triangular formation over time. A valley resident reported that shortly after the lights appeared, three jets were seen heading west in the direction of the lights. An official from Luke AFB stated that there was no U.S. Air Force activity in the area. The next day, a resident of Phoenix told a newspaper that the lights were nothing more than his neighbor releasing helium balloons with flares attached. This was confirmed by a police helicopter. The following day, a Phoenix resident, who declined to be identified in news reports, stated that he had attached flares to helium balloons and released them from his back yard.

== Related films ==
- The Phoenix Lights...We Are Not Alone Documentary, Lynne D. Kitei, M.D., executive producer, in collaboration with Steve Lantz Productions. Based on the book, The Phoenix Lights...A Skeptic's Discovery That We Are Not Alone and featuring astronaut Edgar Mitchell and former Governor of Arizona Fife Symington.
- The Appearance of a Man, directed by Daniel Pace
- Night Skies, a horror movie starring Jason Connery, A.J. Cook, and Ashley Peldon, features the lights. It premiered direct-to-DVD in the U.S. on January 23, 2007.
- They Came from Outer Space (previous title: Phoenix Lights The Movie), a science-fiction thriller starring Ossie Beck, Mackenzie Firgens, Yvette Rachelle, Matt Mercer, Terin Alba, Courtney Gains, Mark Arnold, Michael LeMelle, Aaron Mills, and Luke Amsden
- The Phoenix Incident, a science-fiction conspiracy horror film released in 2015
- The Phoenix Tapes '97, a found footage science-fiction horror film released in 2016
- Phoenix Forgotten, a found footage science-fiction horror film released in 2017
- Star people, a science-fiction drama released in 2025.

== See also ==
- Black project
- Black triangle (UFO)
- Hessdalen lights
- Marfa lights
- Tinley Park Lights
- List of UFO sightings
- Rhodes UFO photographs, taken in Phoenix during the 1947 flying disc craze
