= Wally Bear and the NO! Gang =

1992 video game

- Cover art, by Scott Mavor
- Developer: American Game Cartridges
- Publisher: American Video Entertainment
- Designers: Jamie Furgeson, John Dunn, Scott Schryver, Donald Forbes
- Programmers: Jamie Furgeson, John Dunn, Scott Schryver, Donald Forbes
- Platform: Nintendo Entertainment System
- Release: NA: 1992
- Genre: Side-scroller
- Modes: Single-player, multiplayer

Wally Bear and the NO! Gang is an educational Nintendo Entertainment System game that was released in 1992 exclusively for a North American audience. It was not licensed by Nintendo. The game teaches children to say no to potentially harmful drugs like tobacco, alcohol and marijuana. Wally Bear and the NO! Gang was designed in cooperation with, and endorsed by, the American Medical Association and the National Clearinghouse for Alcohol and Drug Information.

== Wally Bear characters ==
Wally Bear and related characters were originally conceived by Walter J. Marsh, founder of Foglesville, Pennsylvania Edutainment, Inc. The company was founded in April 1990, and a trademark for "Wally Bear and the No Gang" was established in September of that year. A newer character, Recycleman, was trademarked in November 1991.

Long after the release of this NES game, and separate from it, Wally Bear and related characters are still used by the National Clearinghouse for Alcohol and Drug Information in publications, for the purposes of substance abuse awareness and prevention, and the promotion of general health.

== Game development ==
Wally Bear and the NO! Gang was developed by American Game Cartridges. Due to financial problems at AGC by 1991, the rights to distribute it were purchased by American Video Entertainment. Wally Bear and the NO! Gang was originally going to be titled Wally Bear and the Just Say No Team, but due to an existing trademark of the phrase "Just Say No", it was renamed during development.

== Game plot ==
Wally Bear's uncle, Gary Grizzly, has planned a party for Wally and the NO! Gang. At Wally's house, his parents tell him to go invite the rest of his friends to the party, and to reach his uncle Gary's house before dark. They give him parting advice to stay away from drugs.

Wally skateboards everywhere he goes in the game on his way to Gary Grizzly's house. The game is a side-scroller, and levels vary from suburban streets, subway cars, industrial areas, demon fortresses, and city streets. Along the way, Wally meets up with members of the NO! Gang, and converses with them about drug and alcohol use.

Upon reaching Uncle Gary Grizzly's house, Gary reveals that the rest of the NO! Gang has arrived ahead of Wally. Gary breaks the fourth wall, suggesting that Wally has brought a friend with him (meaning, the player of the game). The game ends with a cutscene of the party in progress, and Wally offers anti-drug advice to the player.

=== Game characters ===
==== The NO! Gang ====
- Wally Bear
- Billy Bunny
- Priscilla Possum
- Stevie Squirrel
- Timmy Tiger
- Toby Turtle

==== In-game villains ====
- Ricky Rat
- Larry Lizard
- Willard Weasel

== Game manual ==
=== NES system modification ===
Wally Bear and the NO! Gang, as an unlicensed Nintendo Entertainment System game cartridge, did not work on systems manufactured after October 1990. Newer NES consoles, with a "revision 11" circuit board, contained hardware protections preventing unlicensed game cartridges from running properly. The manual explains this (along with a no symbol above 'Rev. 11', and the title "Just Say NO!"), then provides instructions on how to modify an NES game console to bypass Nintendo's hardware protections.

=== The Wally Bear and the NO! Gang Club ===
The game manual for Wally Bear and the NO! Gang contained a cut-out postcard that allowed the purchaser of the game to join the Wally Bear and the NO! Gang Club. The postcard could be mailed to a post office box in Fogelsville, Pennsylvania (the address of Edutainment, Inc. at the time) along with $3.50. A club member received a poster, stickers, and a bi-monthly newsletter with the "gang's adventures, and products with special membership discounts".

== Reception ==
The game received mixed reviews at release. In its May 1992 issue, GamePro magazine gave Wally Bear a 5 out of 5 rating ("Outstanding!") for Fun Factor, and Challenge. It received a 4 out of 5 ("Great job!") for Gameplay and Graphics, the latter calling it decent. Its lowest rating was for its Music, 3 out of 5 ("Good job"), saying that the music sounds like a Playskool tune.

Years after its release, Wally Bear and the NO! Gang found renewed notoriety through mentions such as an August 15, 1999 article at seanbaby.co

== Use by NCADI/SAMHSA ==
The National Clearinghouse for Alcohol and Drug Information (NCADI), a part of the Substance Abuse and Mental Health Services Administration, has used Wally Bear and related characters for several years as part of alcohol and drug and health awareness aimed at children.

=== Wally Bear and the KNOW Gang ===
NCADI rebranded the team "Wally Bear and the KNOW Gang" before 1994, and expanded their message to include social and general health topics. An eighth character was added, Recycleman. Recycleman was billed as the KNOW Gang's favorite superhero, and was half man, and half machine.

==== The Wally Bear Hotline ====
A toll free telephone number was created and run by the NCADI. Callers to 1-800-HI-WALLY (1-800-449-2559) would be greeted by Wally Bear, and could hear various anti drug and messages relating to topics like alcohol, cigarettes, smokeless tobacco and marijuana. They could join the Wally Bear and the KNOW Gang Club through the mailing address for the NCADI, a post-office box in Rockville, Maryland. This club, unrelated to the one attached to the NES game, allowed ordering posters and other materials.

The hotline gained traction as a standalone children's drug use prevention hotline, as evidenced by a 1995 newspaper article that did not mention the NES game at all. The hotline received national exposure in the February 18, 1996 issue of Parade magazine, and was used on the health.org website in its kids area in the early 2000s.

The content on the hotline was not updated to reflect a complete retool of the Wally Bear franchise in June 2004. Nevertheless, the hotline was still active as late as 2006 with old "Wally Bear and the KNOW Gang" material. The NCADI Wally Bear hotline had been disconnected by June 2007.

=== Building Blocks for a Healthy Future ===
In June 2004, "Wally Bear and the KNOW Gang" was retired. It was replaced with the Building Blocks for a Healthy Future program, featuring "Wally Bear and Friends", later the "Building Blocks Friends". The new program still featured Wally Bear, but his six animal friends had different names or genders (and the second rabbit of the team was changed into a cat). The program featuring the team focused on childhood development, parental interaction with children, and drug and alcohol awareness.

The Building Blocks Friends were retired entirely from the program website by March 2015 as the site was "enhanced to incorporate the latest evidence-based strategies and programs on early childhood health promotion and substance abuse prevention". That said, it is still possible to order the Building Blocks for a Healthy Future Kit from the old program as a paper publication.
