= Chiller (video game) =

1986 video game

- NES cover art
- Developer: Exidy
- Publishers: Exidy; AGC; HES
- Platforms: Arcade; NES
- Release: 1986, 1990 (NES)
- Genres: Light gun shooter; horror
- Arcade system: Exidy 440

Chiller is a light gun arcade game released in 1986 by Exidy. An unlicensed port was released for the Nintendo Entertainment System in 1990 by American Game Cartridges in the US, and in Australia by HES (Home Entertainment Suppliers), with the option of using either the standard controller or the NES Zapper.

In the game, the player takes on the role of an unseen torturer who must maim, mutilate, and murder restrained non-player characters in a variety of dungeon settings.

== Gameplay ==
The torture chamber of Chiller

The gameplay consists of shooting as many targets (“monsters”) as indicated by the Monster Meter at the top of the screen before the timer at the bottom runs out. The game features four main levels: the torture chamber, the rack room, the haunted house hallway, and the graveyard. After completing the final level, the game loops back to the first level with a higher target requirement, and each target awards more points. The game only ends when the player fails to reach the target goal within the time limit.

Each level contains a series of secret targets, which are shown in the middle of the screen before entering the level. If all secret targets in a level are found, the player can earn a bonus score by winning at the slot machine. A final bonus round is unlocked when all secrets across all levels are discovered. This bonus round consists of target practice in which objects moving at increasingly high speeds must be shot.

The first two levels feature seemingly human NPCs restrained by medieval torture devices. After these levels, the game transitions into a more traditional shooting game; requiring the player to defeat paranormal creatures, such as zombies, ghosts, and mummies.

== Reception ==
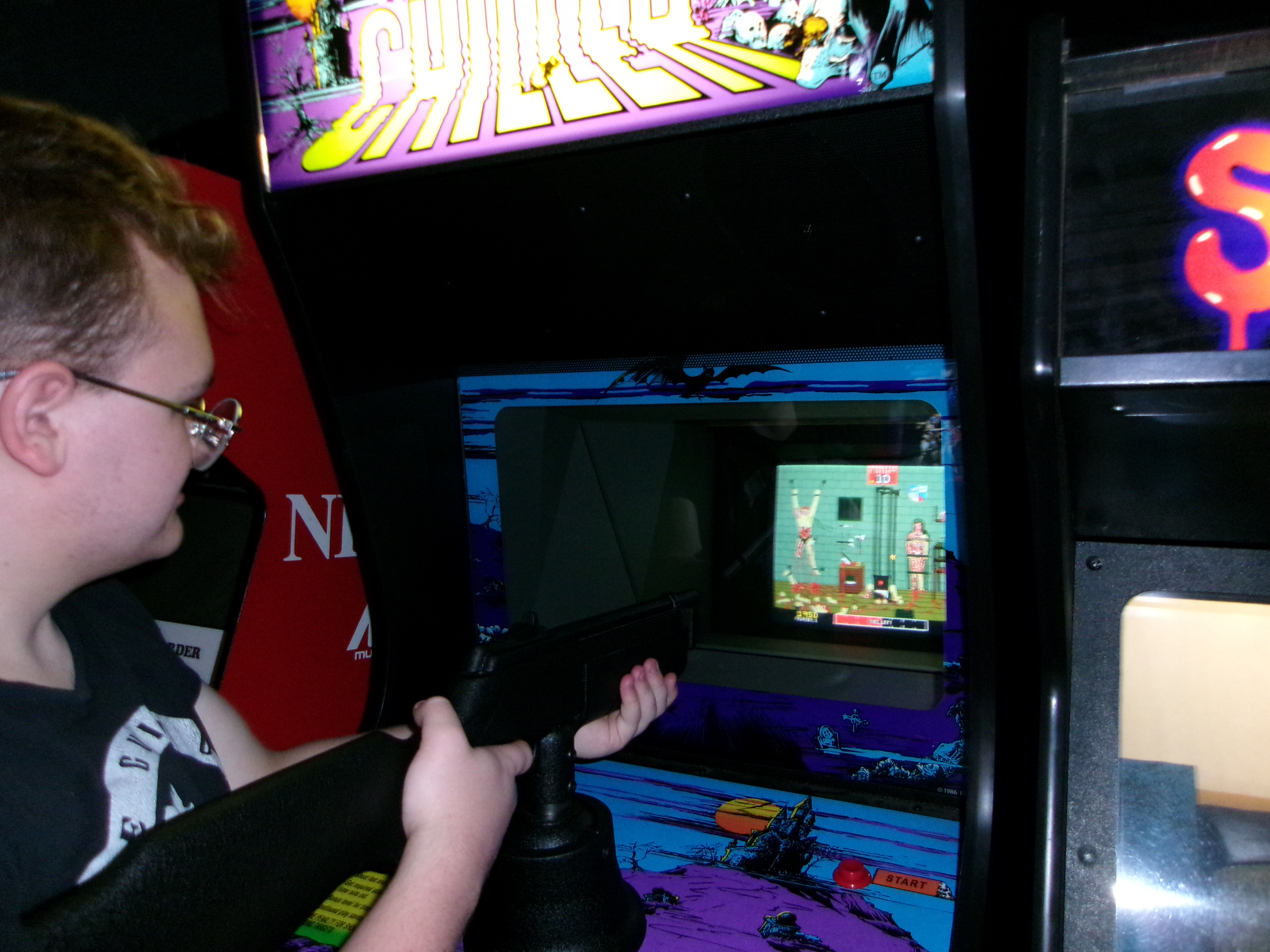
A man using the light gun controller on the Chiller arcade cabinet.

The game sold poorly in the United States because arcade owners refused to purchase it; Exidy successfully marketed it to developing nations. Modern reviewers often criticize the game for its senseless violence and encouraging the torture and murder of apparently innocent people, as opposed to the gamer fighting enemies capable of defending themselves.
