= Steve Karmen discography =

This is a discography of the American composer Steve Karmen, who is best known for his jingles.

== Jingles ==
This list includes jingles composed from 1968 to the beginning of 1980.

Year	Title	Company/Product	Awards	Ref
1968	"Breakaway In A Wide-Trackin' Pontiac"	Pontiac		
1968	"Bud Is The King Of Beers...But You Know That"	Budweiser		
1968	"Your Next Car Is A Chrysler"	Chrysler		
1968	"At Beneficial (Doot! Doot!) You're Good For More"	Beneficial Finance		
1969	"Plymouth Makes It"	Plymouth		
1969	"There's Nothing Like The Face Of A Kid Eating A Hershey Bar"	Hershey		
1969	"You Know Who You Are"	Tijuana Smalls		
1969	""Call Nationwide, 'Cause Nationwide Is On Your Side"	Nationwide Insurance		
1970	"Chrysler Plymouth Comin' Thru"	Chrysler Plymouth		
1970	"The More You Know, The More You'll Want"	Delco		
1970	"When You Say Budweiser, You've Said It All"	Budweiser		
1970	"Falstaff Beer, For Guys Who Like It"	Falstaff Brewing Company		
1971	"Here Comes The King"	Budweiser		
1971	"The Michelob Drinking Song"	Michelob		
1971	"The Land Of Pleasant Living"	National Bohemian		
1971	"Everybody Likes It"	Diet Rite Cola		
1971	"Pitch In To Clean Up America"	Brewers Association		
1971	"It's Great To Know You're Good For More"	Beneficial Finance		
1972	"Sooner Or Later You'll Own Generals"	General Tire		
1972	"The First Malt Liquor Good Enough To Be Called Budweiser"	Budweiser		
1972	"A Completely Unique Experience"	Colt 45		
1972	"You'll Be Sorry For All The Time You Wasted"	Colt 45		
1972	"Tastes Like A Soft Drink"	Fresca		
1972	"It's Right For You"	R.C. Cola		
1972	"Doublemint Will Do It"	Doublemint Gum		
1972	"Hush Puppies Are Dumb"	Hush Puppies		
1973	"Stand Up"	Pontiac		
1973	"I Can Be Very Friendly"	Sunoco		
1973	"Let's Pick A Pack"	Juicy Fruit Gum		
1973	"Carry The Big Fresh Flavor"	Wrigley's Spearmint Gum		
1973	"We're Big On That"	Ozark Air Lines		
1974	"A Standard For The World"	Cadillac		
1974	"We Made It First, We Make It Last"	Michelin Tires		
1974	"You'll Like The Big, Long-Lasting Flavor"	Wrigley's Spearmint Gum		
1974	"Feelin' Like A Million Bucks"	Buc Wheats Cereal		
1974	"We Give You Half The World"	Northwest Orient Airlines		
1974	"A Taste Of Europe—Trans World Service"	Trans World Airlines		
1974	"Aren't You Glad You Use Dial"	Dial Soap		
1974	"Purina In The Little Blue Can"	Purina Cat Food		
1974	"The Comfortable Life"	Scholl's Sandals		
1974	"Weekends Were Made For Michelob"	Michelob		
1975	"Farrell's Is Fabulous Fun"	Farrell's Ice Cream Parlour		
1975	"The Burry's Blues"	Burry's Cookies		
1975	"You Haven't Read The Paper Until You've Read The News"	The Detroit News		
1975	"The Greatest Day In Your Life"	Great Adventure Amusement Park		
1976	"Energy For A Strong America"	Exxon		
1976	"We Make It Easy For You"	Ozark Airlines		
1976	"It's a No-No"	Hi-C		
1976	"Better Dishwasher"	Whirlpool		
1976	"You Know It Protects"	Prestone Anti-Freeze		
1976	"Don't Compromise, Midasize"	Midas Muffler		
1976	"Won't Fill You Up, So It Won't Slow You Down"	Natural Light		
1976	"When Do You Say Budweiser?"	Budweiser		
1976	"It's Our Flavor That Makes Us Special"	International Coffees		
1976	"A Sunwich Is Better Than A Sandwich"	Sunbeam Bread		
1976	"What Else Is So Nice For The Price"	Southwestern Bell Telephone		
1976	"Enjoy the Good Things"	Beneficial Finance		
1976	"With Visa, You've Got the World In Your Hand"	Visa		
1976	"Truckload of Pleasure"	Hess Oil		
1976	"Being the Best Isn't Everything"	Trans World Airlines		
1976	"Purina Nose"	Purina		
1976	"Land O' Lakes Margarine"	Land O' Lakes		
1977	"Take A Natural Break"	Natural Light		
1977	"When We Brew It Light, We Do It Right"	Anheuser Light Beer		
1977	"What'll We Cook Up Next?"	West Bend Company		
1977	"The Fruit Fly Song"	Hi-C		
1977	"Fill 'er Up With Champions"	Champion		
1977	Weekend Pops (instrumental) - based upon "Weekends Were Made For Michelob"	Michelob		
1977	"Ji-Ji-Jack, Ji-Ji-Jack—Jack In The Box"	Jack in the Box		
1977	"It's Time For A Tic Tac"	Tic Tac		
1977	"(Hershey Is) The Great American Chocolate Bar"	Hershey		
1977	"I Love New York"	New York Tourism	CLIO for Best Music With Lyrics - opening/tag category (1978)	
1978	"Good Taste Runs In The Family"	Michelob		
1978	"That's What It's All About"	Beneficial Finance		
1979	"Ford, That's Incredible!"	Ford		
1979	"Sunoco Is Making Every Drop Count"	Sunoco		
1979	"We Better Be Better"	Braniff		
1979	"You and Eureka"	Eureka		
1979	"We Care"	The Leukemia Society of America		
1980	"Give That Man A Blue Ribbon"	Pabst Blue Ribbon		
?	"You can take Salem out of the country, but you can't take the country out of Salem"	Salem Cigarettes		
?	"Trust the Midas Touch"	Midas		

== Film scores ==
Year	Film	Notes	Ref
1960	Juke Box Racket	Composer	
1963	Hollywood Nude Report	Music	
1964	The Candidate	Music	
1964	The Beautiful, the Bloody and the Bare	Music composition	
1965	The Sexploiters	Music	
1966	Teenage Gang Debs	Music	
1966	Misconduct	Music	
1967	Teenage Mother	Music	
1970	What Do You Say to a Naked Lady?	Music and lyrics	
1981	Paternity	Song	
2002	The Kid Stays in the Picture	Song "Being Yourself"	
2019	Joker	Song	

== Other releases ==
Year	A Side	B side	Record label	Ref
1957	"Freight Train"	"Mama Look-A Boo Boo"	Eldorado Recording Studios	
1960	"Lost"	"Free Passes"	Cub Records	
1968	"Breakaway" Part 1	"Breakaway" Part 2 (feat. Jimmy Radcliffe)	United Artists	
1969	"Moments"	"Moments" (instrumental)	United Artists	
1970	"What Do You Say to a Naked Lady?"	"Too Bad You Can't Read My Mind"	United Artists	
1971	"You've Said It All" (Four Feeling)	"You've Said It All" (Tuba Version)	Audio Fidelity Records	
1971	"Everybody Likes It"	"The East Way"	Audio Fidelity Records	
1972	"I've Never Had The Time"	"37-21"	Audio Fidelity Records	
