= Georgia Tech Yellow Jackets =

Intercollegiate sports team

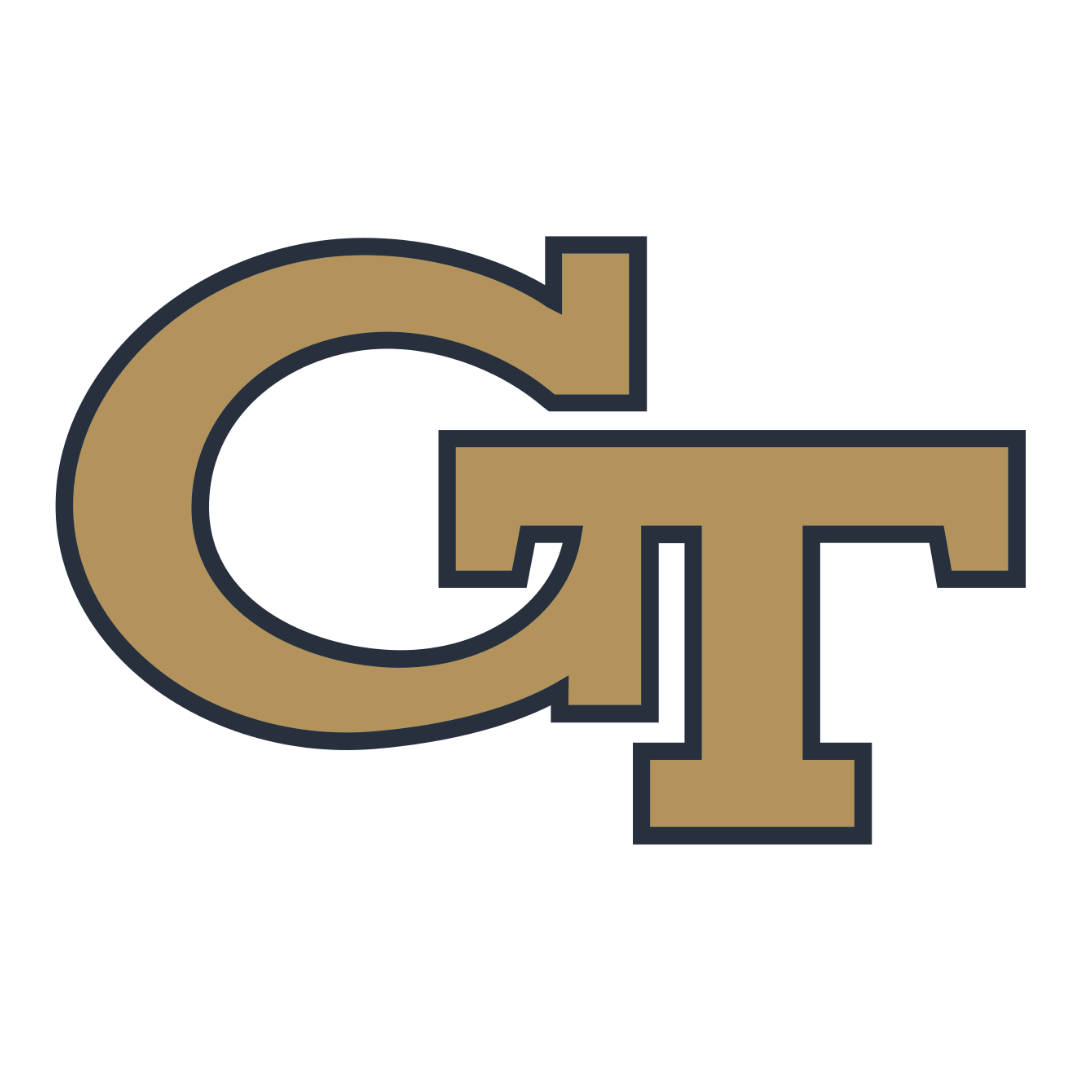
- University: Georgia Institute of Technology
- Nickname: Yellow Jackets, Ramblin' Wreck
- NCAA: Division I (FBS)
- Conference: Atlantic Coast Conference
- Athletic director: Ryan Alpert
- Location: Atlanta, Georgia
- Varsity teams: 17
- Football stadium: Bobby Dodd Stadium at Hyundai Field
- Basketball arena: McCamish Pavilion
- Baseball stadium: Russ Chandler Stadium
- Other venues: George C. Griffin Track and Field Facility
- Colors: Gold and white
- Mascot: Buzz & Ramblin' Wreck
- Fight song: "Ramblin' Wreck from Georgia Tech" and "Up with the White and Gold"
- Website: ramblinwreck.com

Atlantic Coast Conference logo in Georgia Tech's colors

The Georgia Tech Yellow Jackets is the name used for all of the intercollegiate athletic teams that represent the Georgia Institute of Technology (Georgia Tech), located in Atlanta, Georgia, United States. The teams have also been nicknamed the Ramblin' Wreck, Engineers, Blacksmiths, and Golden Tornado. There are eight men's and seven women's teams that compete in the National Collegiate Athletic Association (NCAA) Division I athletics and the Football Bowl Subdivision. Georgia Tech is a member of the Coastal Division (divisional system not in use) in the Atlantic Coast Conference.

The official school colors for Georgia Tech are tech gold and white. Navy blue is often used as a secondary color and for alternate jerseys, while black has been used on rare occasions. The traditional rival in all sports is in-state University of Georgia. This rivalry is often referred to as Clean, Old-Fashioned Hate. There are also rivalries with out-of-state Auburn and official conference rival Clemson.

The athletic department is run by the Georgia Tech Athletic Association, a private organization located on campus. The current athletic director is Ryan Alpert. The department dedicates about $53 million per year to its sports teams and facilities. From November 28, 2016 until his dismissal on September 26, 2022, the athletic director of Georgia Tech was Todd Stansbury, who replaced Mike Bobinski after the latter left for the same position at Purdue. On October 14, 2022, former Alabama executive deputy director of athletics, chief operating officer, and chief revenue officer J Batt was hired, with his tenure beginning 10 days later. Most athletic teams have on-campus facilities for competition, including Bobby Dodd Stadium at Hyundai Field for football, the McCamish Pavilion at Cremins' Court for men's and women's basketball, and Russ Chandler Stadium for baseball.

Georgia Tech was a founding member of the Southern Intercollegiate Athletic Association in 1895. Georgia Tech was one of the 14 schools that split to found the Southern Conference in 1921. Thirteen schools including Georgia Tech split in 1932 to form the Southeastern Conference. In 1956, the Yellow Jackets played in the first integrated Sugar Bowl game under civil rights advocate Blake Van Leer's tenure. The Yellow Jackets left the SEC in 1964 and remained independent until becoming a founding member of the Metro-6 Conference in 1975. Georgia Tech moved to the ACC in 1978 and began competition within the ACC in 1979.

== Sports sponsored ==
Men's sports	Women's sports
Baseball	Basketball
Basketball	Cross country
Cross country	Softball
Football	Swimming and diving
Golf	Tennis
Swimming and diving	Track and field^{†}
Tennis	Volleyball
Track and field^{†}	
† – Track and field includes both indoor and outdoor

The Georgia Institute of Technology sponsors teams in eight men's and seven women's NCAA sanctioned sports. Georgia Tech is the only Power Four school that does not sponsor women's soccer.

=== Football ===
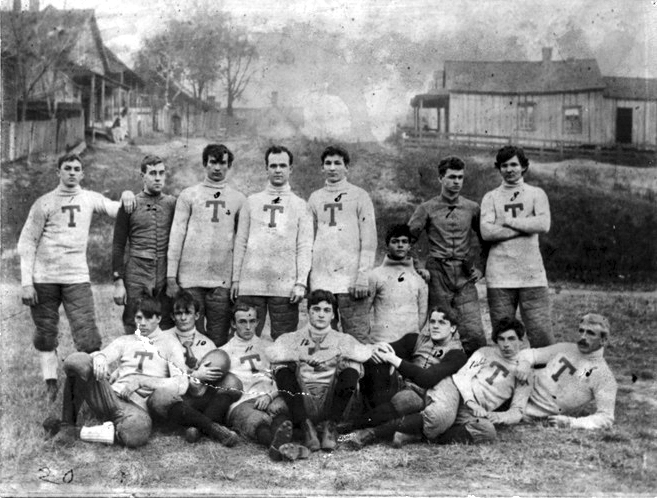
The first Georgia Tech football team, 1893

The football team is traditionally the most popular at the Institute. The games are played at Bobby Dodd Stadium at Historic Grant Field or simply The Flats, which is the oldest on-campus stadium in Division I FBS football. The stadium was expanded in recent years, increasing the maximum capacity to 55,000.

Georgia Tech plays an Atlantic Coast Conference Coastal Division schedule in addition to yearly cross divisional games against Clemson and two other Atlantic Division teams. In addition, the team has a yearly out-of-conference meeting with Georgia at the end of the season known as Clean, Old-Fashioned Hate.

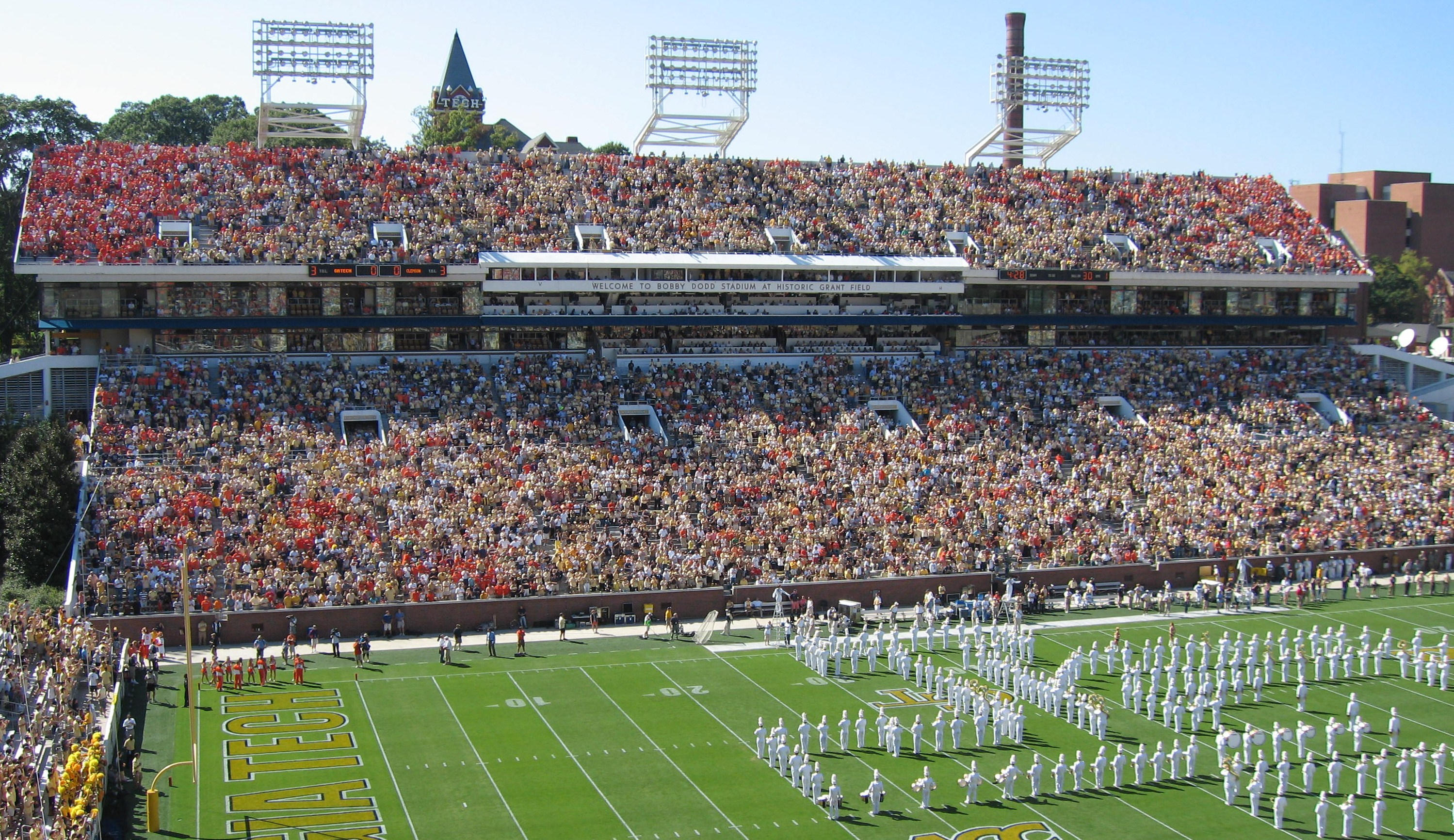
Bobby Dodd Stadium at Hyundai Field

The football team is in the top 20 winningest Division I-A programs and was the first team to win all four of the historical big four bowls – the Rose (1929), Orange (1940), Sugar (1944), and Cotton (1955). Georgia Tech has won four national titles in the years 1917 going 9–0 under John Heisman outscoring opponents 419–17, 1928 going 10–0 under William Alexander outscoring opponents 221–47, 1952 going 12–0 under Bobby Dodd outscoring opponents 325–59, and 1990 going 11–0–1 under Bobby Ross outscoring opponents 379–186.

The Yellow Jackets have won a total of 15 conference titles. They won 5 SIAA titles in 1916, 1917, 1918, 1920, and 1921; 3 Southern Conference titles in 1922, 1927, and 1928; 5 SEC titles in 1939, 1943, 1944, 1951, 1952, and the 1990, 1998 and 2009 ACC championships along with the 2006, 2009, 2012, and 2014 ACC Coastal Division Championships. Paul Johnson and Georgia Tech won the 2009 ACC Championship in Tampa Florida. The team has played in 46 bowl games, posting a record of 26-20. The resulting win percentage of 0.629 is currently the second-highest among teams with over 20 bowl appearances.

Three Jacket players were named to the ACC 50th Anniversary Team in 2002: Marco Coleman, OLB; Joe Hamilton, QB; and Ken Swilling, DB. Some notable and more recent Georgia Tech football players are three-time All-American Calvin Johnson, Keith Brooking, Joe Burns, Marco Coleman, Joe Hamilton, Tony Hollings, Dorsey Levens, and Arizona Cardinals head coach Ken Whisenhunt. Three Atlantic Coast Conference Players of the Year hailed from Georgia Tech. They were Joe Hamilton (1999), Calvin Johnson (2006), and Jonathan Dwyer (2008).

=== Men's basketball ===
The Georgia Tech men's basketball team plays its home games in the new McCamish Pavilion The program saw its most sustained success under the tenure of Bobby Cremins. Bobby Cremins led his team to the first ACC tournament victory in school history in 1985, and in 1990 he took Georgia Tech to the school's first Final Four appearance ever. Cremins retired from Georgia Tech in 2000 with the school's best coaching win percentage.

The current head coach of Georgia Tech is Damon Stoudamire, who took over from Josh Pastner in 2022. Up until March 2011, Paul Hewitt was the head coach Georgia Tech. Helping revitalize a stagnant program in 2004, he led Georgia Tech to a Cinderella season as the school earned its second berth in an NCAA national title game in any sport. That team won the Pre-Season NIT, ended Duke's 41 game home winning streak, and finished its season losing by 9 points in the national title game to Connecticut. Hewitt was fired on March 12, 2011 after having three losing seasons over the previous four years.

Some notable and more recent Georgia Tech basketball players are Josh Okogie, Iman Shumpert, Derrick Favors, Anthony Morrow, Javaris Crittenton, Thaddeus Young, Stephon Marbury, Matt Harpring, Dennis Scott, Kenny Anderson, Travis Best, Chris Bosh, Jarrett Jack, Mark Price, and John Salley.

=== Women's basketball ===
Like the men's team, the women's basketball team plays its home games in McCamish Pavilion. The current women's coach is Karen Blair, former associate head coach at Maryland.She took over for Nell Fortner, former US Women's National Team coach from 1997-2000.

=== Baseball ===
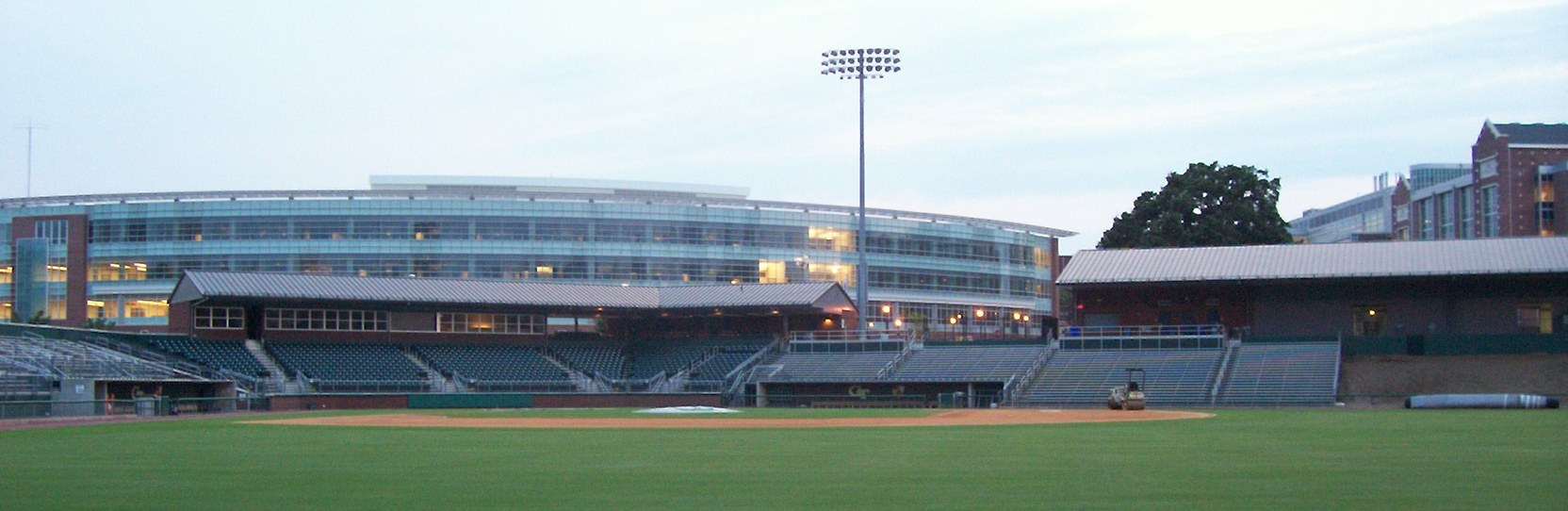
Russ Chandler Stadium

Baseball is a prominent sport at Georgia Tech. The baseball team plays its home games at Russ Chandler Stadium, and is one of the leading programs in the NCAA.

The team's success is guided by head coach Danny Hall. Hall has coached Tech for 13 seasons and has posted 579 wins over that span. He has led Georgia Tech to 12 years of NCAA regional play, and its only three College World Series appearances in 1994, 2002, and 2006. The baseball team, under Hall, has become an annual contender for the ACC regular season and tournament titles winning each four and three times respectively.

Some notable Georgia Tech baseball players are Erskine Mayer, Kevin Brown, Nomar Garciaparra, Matt Murton, Kevin Cameron, Charlie Blackmon, Matt Wieters, Eric Patterson, Brandon Boggs, Jay Payton, Mark Teixeira, and Jason Varitek. Jason Varitek's number 33 is one of two numbers retired, Coach Jim Luck's number 44 is the other.

=== Softball ===
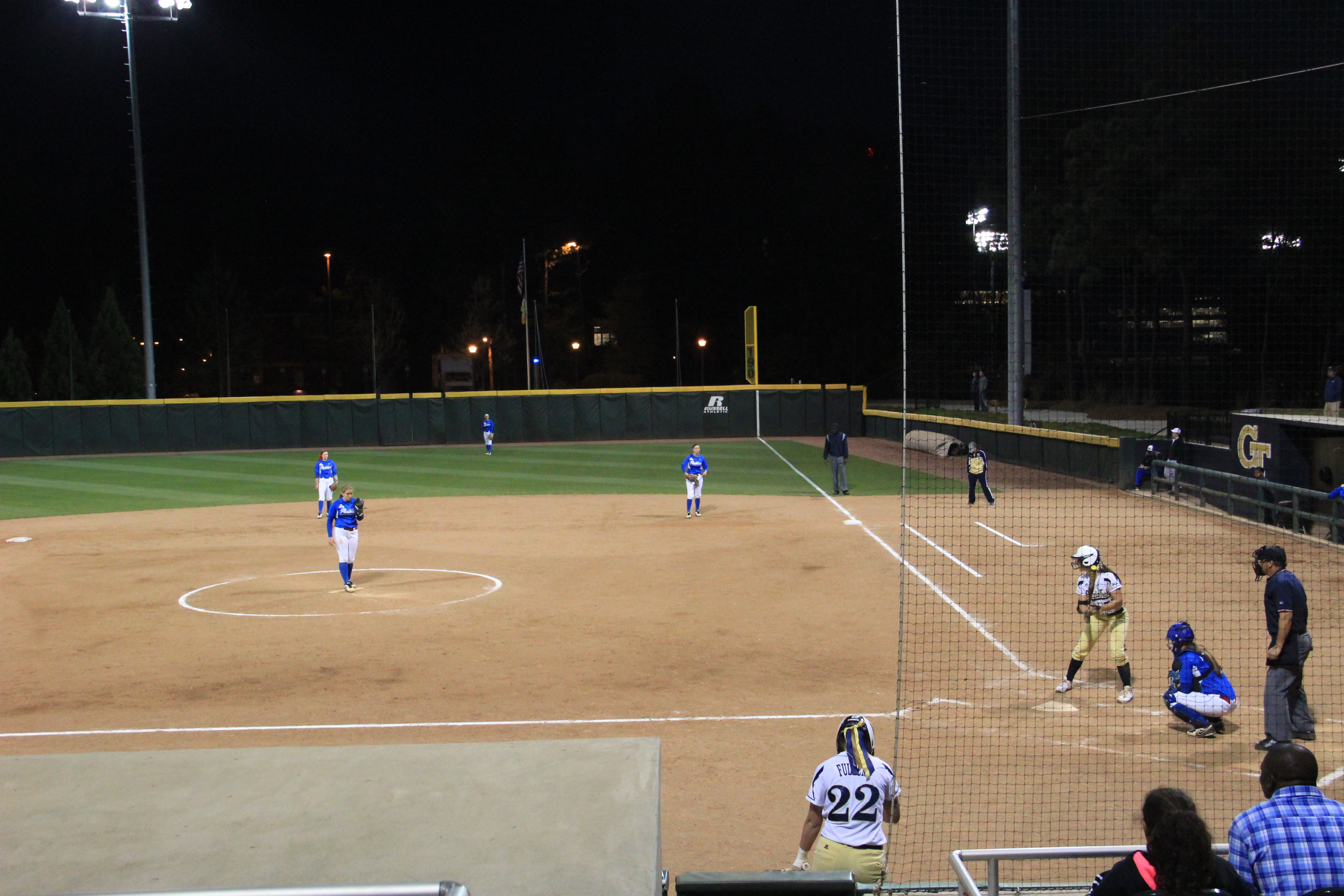
Shirley Clements Mewborn Field

Georgia Tech fields a softball team under coach Aileen Morales. In 2011, the team won their third straight ACC Regular Season title. Also in 2011, Sharon Perkins was named the ACC Coach of the Year; this is her third consecutive year winning that award, the first ACC coach win it in three consecutive years. In 2009, the team moved from Glenn Field to Shirley Clements Mewborn Field. The Yellow Jackets softball team began play in 1987. The team has made eleven NCAA Tournament appearances in 2002, 2003, 2004, 2005, 2006, 2007, 2008, 2009, 2010, 2011, and 2012. The current head coach is Aileen Morales.

=== Golf ===
Georgia Tech Yellow Jackets men's golf team is one of the most consistent Yellow Jacket teams. They have won 20 conference championships:

- Southeastern Conference (1): 1949
- Atlantic Coast Conference (18): 1985, 1991, 1992, 1993, 1994, 1999, 2001, 2002, 2006, 2007, 2009, 2010, 2011, 2012, 2014, 2015, 2018, 2019, 2023

They have produced four NCAA individual champions: Watts Gunn in 1927, Charlie Yates in 1934, Troy Matteson in 2002, and Hiroshi Tai in 2024. Their best team finish is second place in 1993, 2000, 2002, 2005, and 2023.

The men's golf team made the NCAA Championship round ten straight years (1998–2007) under Bruce Heppler, head coach since 1996. In 2005, the program was rated by Golf Magazine as the #1 collegiate golf program in the country.

Some notable Georgia Tech golfers are David Duval, Stewart Cink, Troy Matteson, Larry Mize, Bryce Molder, Cameron Tringale and Matt Kuchar. The most famous alumnus of the golf program however remains legendary amateur Bobby Jones, winner of the Grand Slam in 1930 and the founder of Augusta National Golf Club and the Masters Tournament, a major championship hosted annually by Augusta National.

=== Tennis ===
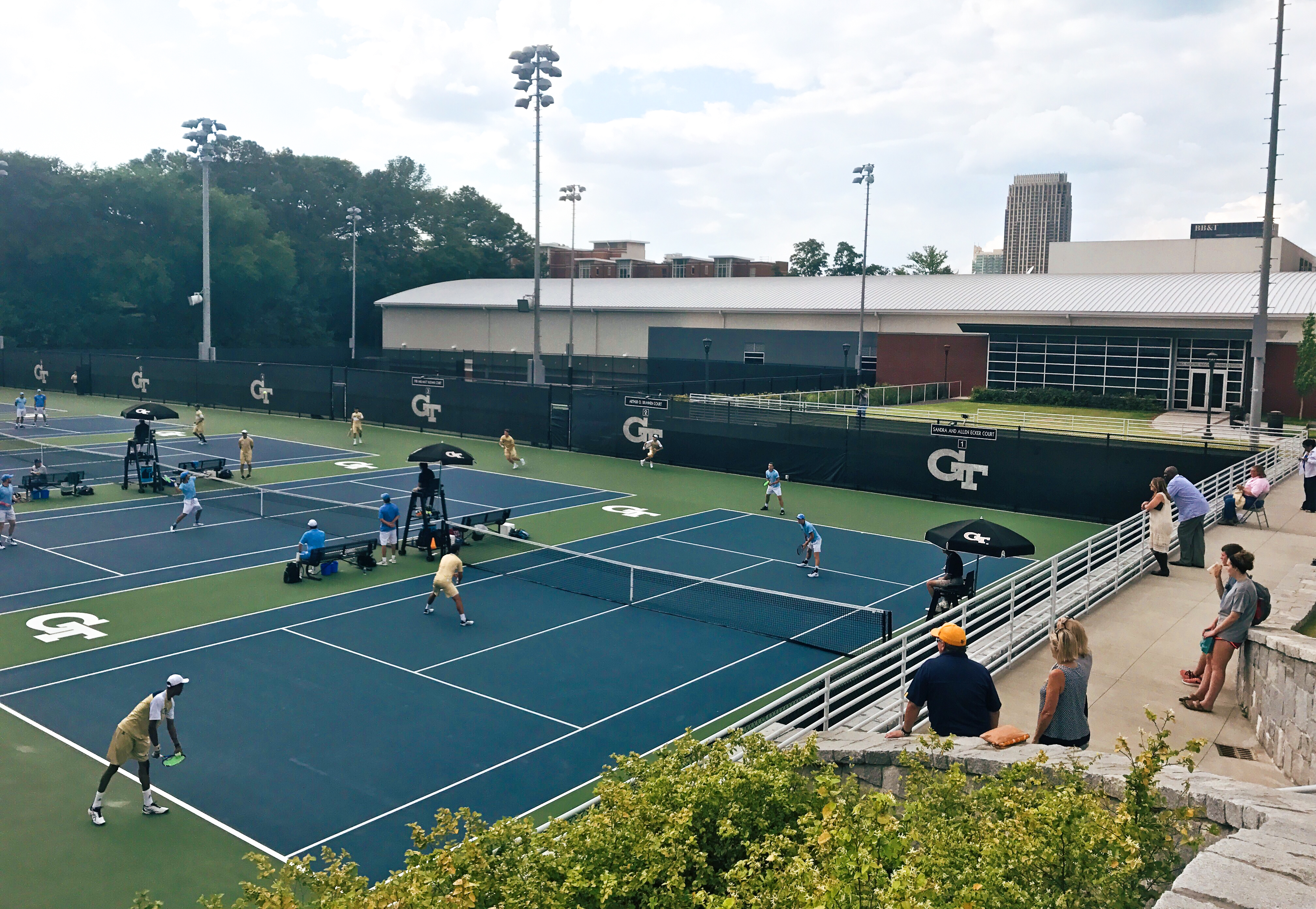
An outdoor match being played at the Ken Byers Tennis Complex

Georgia Tech has both men's and women's tennis teams. The teams play their home matches at the Ken Byers Tennis Complex, which opened in 2013. The facility houses six indoor courts, six outdoor competition courts, and four outdoor practice courts.

The women's tennis team became the first NCAA National Champion in Georgia Tech team sports history by winning 4–2 over UCLA in Athens, Georgia on May 22, 2007. The 2007 National Championship team was coached by Bryan Shelton. As a player in his freshman season (1985), Shelton won Georgia Tech's first individual ACC title. The women's tennis team is currently coached by Rodney Harmon, and assisted by Christy Lynch.

The men's team has won six conference titles since 1918 (one in the SIAA, two in the SoConn, and three in the SEC). They have made 15 NCAA Tournament appearances. The men's tennis team is currently coached by former Georgia Tech player Kenny Thorne, and assisted by Jeremy Efferding. In 2011, Thorne was named ITA National Coach of the Year.

Some notable recent Georgia Tech Tennis players are Christopher Eubanks, Irina Falconi, Kevin King, and Juan Carlos Spir.

=== Volleyball ===
Georgia Tech Women's Volleyball is one of the newer additions to Georgia Tech's athletic department, having only been started in the past twenty years. Despite the program's youth, it has been a dominant force in the ACC. O'Keefe Gymnasium has served as the home of the Georgia Tech volleyball team since 1995.

Georgia Tech Yellow Jackets women's volleyball has become a regular contender in the Atlantic Coast Conference and has qualified for the NCAA Division I Women's Volleyball Tournament multiple times in recent years. The team has also set school records for victories in a season, consecutive conference wins, and overall consecutive victories.

== Other sports ==
Georgia Tech also fields men and women's track and field, men and women's swimming and diving, men and women's cross country, and assorted club sports.

Georgia Tech's Angelo Taylor won gold medals in 400 m hurdles at the 2000 and 2008 Summer Olympics.

Buddy Fowlkes was one of Tech's most successful track coaches.

The non-NCAA sanctioned club sports include but are not limited to crew, cricket, cycling, equestrian, esports, fencing, field hockey, gymnastics, ice hockey, kayaking, lacrosse, paintball, roller hockey, rugby, sailing, skydiving, soccer, swimming, triathlon, ultimate, water polo, and wrestling.

== Traditions ==
=== Mascots ===
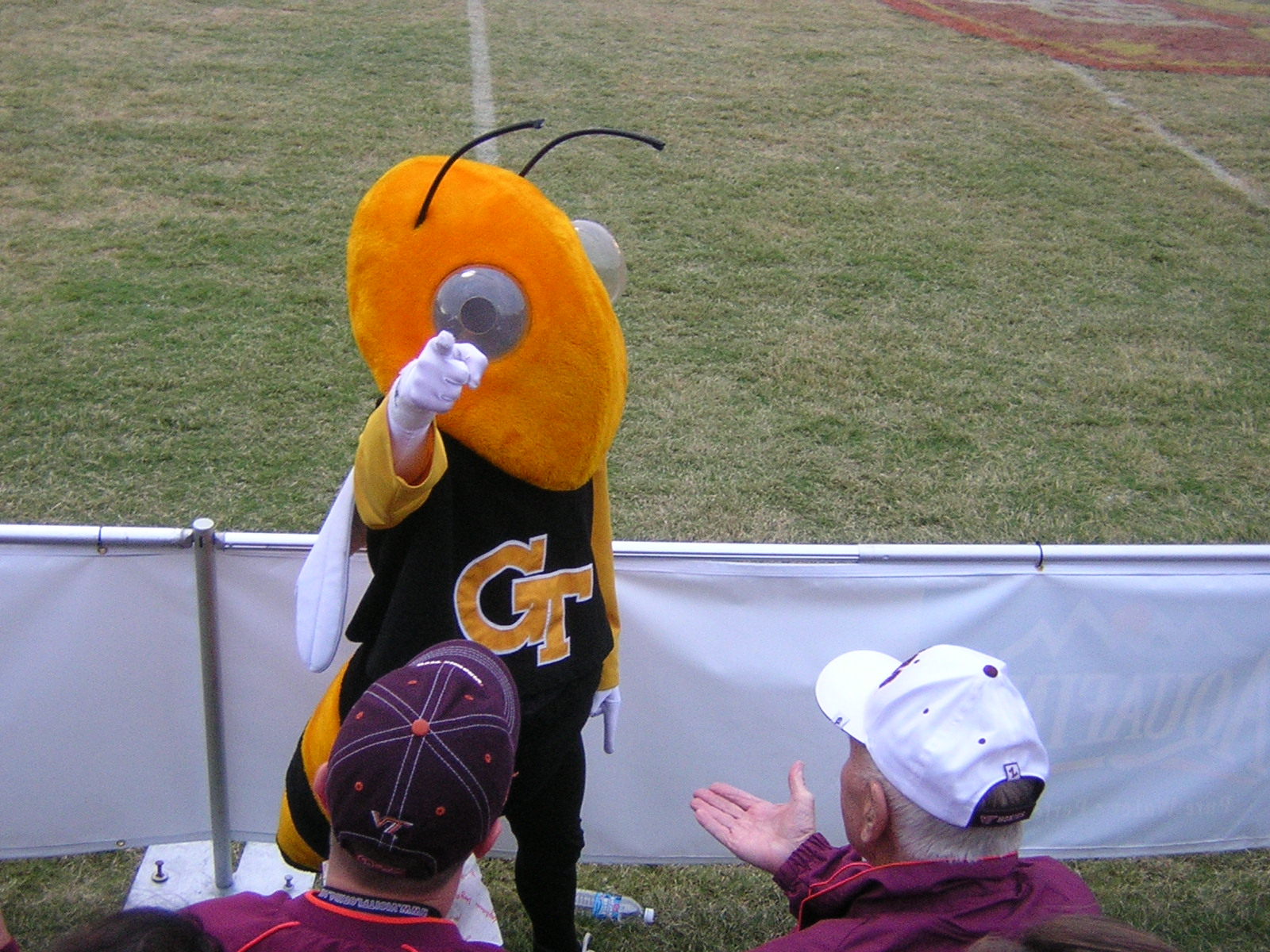
Buzz, the mascot

Costumed in plush to look like a yellow jacket, the official mascot of Georgia Tech is Buzz.

The Ramblin' Wreck was the first official mascot of Georgia Tech. It is a 1930 Ford Model A Sports Coupe. The Wreck has led the football team onto the field every home game since 1961. The Wreck features a gold and white paint job, two gold flags emblazoned with the words "To Hell With Georgia" and "Give 'Em Hell Tech", and a white soft top. The Wreck is maintained by the Ramblin' Reck Club, a selective student leadership organization on campus.

=== Spirit organizations ===
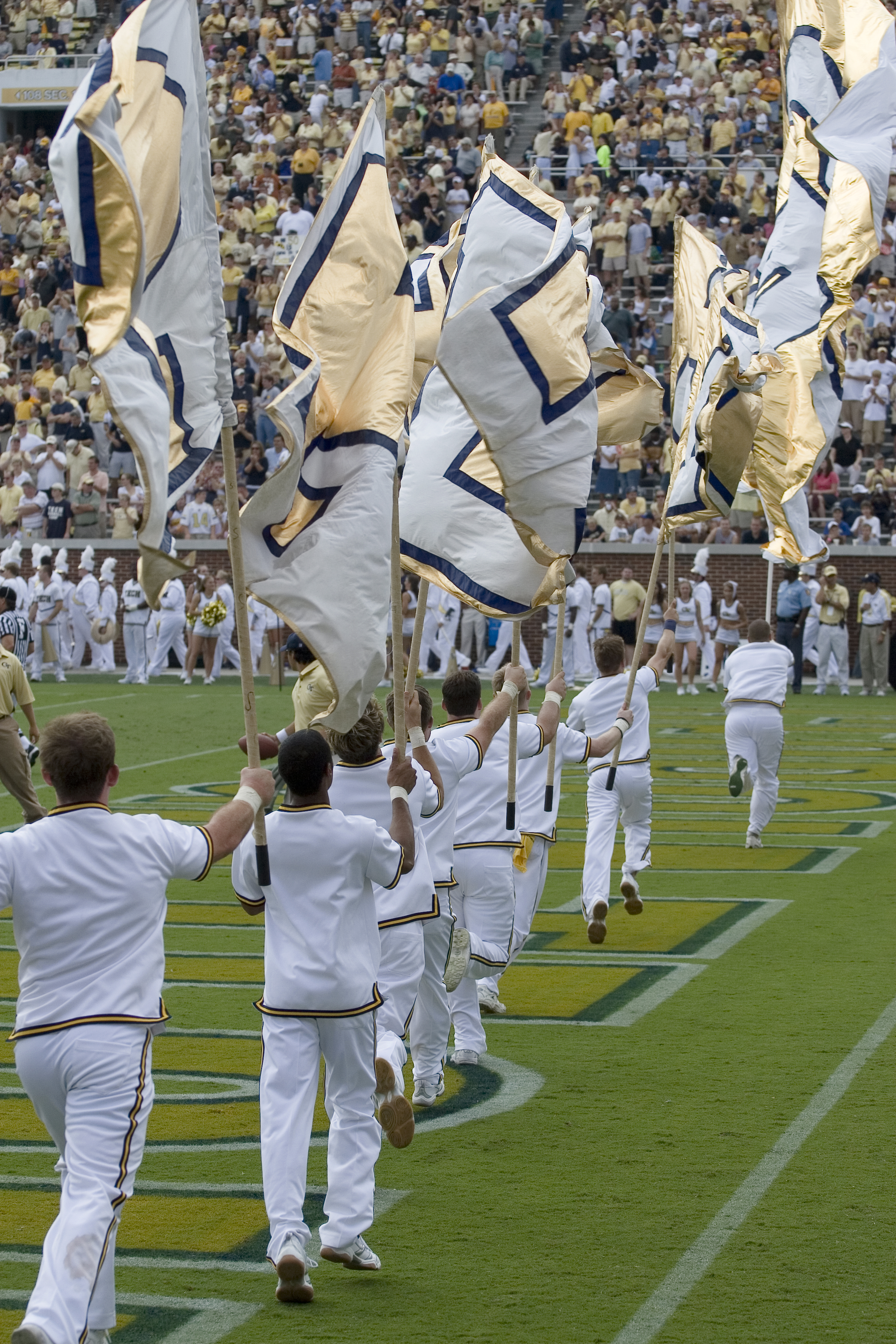
Tech cheerleaders waving flags after a touchdown.

The Ramblin' Reck Club is charged with upholding all school traditions and creating new traditions such as the SWARM. The SWARM is a 900-member spirit group seated along the north end zone or on the court at basketball games. This is the group that typically features body painting, organized chants, and general fanaticism.

The marching band that performs at halftime and after big plays during the football season is clad in all white and sits next to SWARM at football games providing a dichotomy of white and gold in the North End Zone. The band is also the primary student organization on campus that upholds the tradition of RAT caps, wherein band freshman wear the traditional yellow cap at all band events.

=== Fight songs and chants ===
The band plays the fight songs Ramblin' Wreck from Georgia Tech and Up With the White and Gold after every football score and between every basketball period. At the end of a rendition of either fight song, there is a series of drum beats followed by the cheer "Go Jackets" three times (each time followed by a second cheer of "bust their ass"), then a different drum beat and the cheer "Fight, Win, Drink, Get Naked!" The official cheer only includes "Fight, Win" but most present other than the band and cheerleaders will yell the extended version.

It is also tradition for the band to play the "When You Say Budweiser" after the third quarter of football and during the second-to-last official timeout of every basketball game. During the "Budweiser Song", all of the fans in the stadium alternate bending their knees and standing up straight. Other notable band songs are Michael Jackson's Thriller for half-time at the Thrillerdome, Ludacris' Move Bitch for large gains in football. Another popular chant is called the Good Word and it begins with asking, "What's the Good Word?" The response from all Tech faithful is, "To Hell With Georgia." The same question is asked three times and then the followup is asked, "How 'bout them dogs?" And everyone yells, "Piss on 'em."

== Championships ==
=== NCAA team championships ===
Georgia Tech has won 1 NCAA team national championship.

- Women's (1)
  - Tennis (1): 2007
- see also:
  - ACC NCAA team championships
  - List of NCAA schools with the most NCAA Division I championships

=== Other team championships ===
Below are 4 national team titles that were not bestowed by the NCAA:

- Men's:
  - Football: 1917, 1928, 1952, 1990

== Notable alumni ==
Approximately 150 Tech students have gone into the NFL, with many others going into the NBA or MLB. American football athletes include former students Calvin Johnson, Daryl Smith, and Keith Brooking, former Tech head football coaches John Heisman, Pepper Rodgers, and Bill Fulcher, and all-time greats such as Joe Hamilton, Pat Swilling, Billy Shaw, Joe Guyon, and Demaryius Thomas.

Tech's recent entrants into the NBA include Jose Alvardo, Iman Shumpert, Derrick Favors, Javaris Crittenton, Thaddeus Young, Jarrett Jack, Luke Schenscher, Stephon Marbury, and Chris Bosh. Award-winning baseball stars include Kevin Brown, Mark Teixeira, Nomar Garciaparra, Jason Varitek, and Jay Payton. In golf, the legendary Bobby Jones founded The Masters, David Duval was ranked No. 1 in the world in 2001, Stewart Cink the 2009 Open Championship winner, was ranked in the top ten, and Matt Kuchar won the U.S. Amateur.

== See also ==
- 1916 Cumberland vs. Georgia Tech football game – The most lopsided college football game of all time
