= I Eat Your Skin =

- Theatrical release poster advertising a double feature of I Drink Your Blood and I Eat Your Skin
- Directed by: Del Tenney
- Written by: Del Tenney
- Produced by: Del Tenney
- Starring: William Joyce; Heather Hewitt; Betty Hyatt Linton; Dan Stapleton; Walter Coy
- Cinematography: François Farkas
- Edited by: Larry Keating
- Music by: Lon E. Norman
- Production company: Del Tenney Productions
- Distributed by: Cinemation Industries
- Release date: May 7, 1971 (Los Angeles)
- Running time: 82 minutes
- Country: United States
- Language: English
- Budget: $120,000

I Eat Your Skin (also known as Zombies, Zombie Bloodbath and Voodoo Blood Bath) is a 1971 American horror film written, produced and directed by Del Tenney. It stars William Joyce, Heather Hewitt and Walter Coy. The film was shot entirely in Florida in 1964 under the title Caribbean Adventure to disguise from potential investors the fact that it was a zombie film.

The film was completed in 1965, but failed to find a distributor and was shelved until 1971, when distributor Jerry Gross bought it and retitled it to form the exploitational-sounding double feature I Drink Your Blood and I Eat Your Skin. The film follows the adventures of a playboy novelist who travels to Voodoo Island in the Caribbean to research a new book. While there he unexpectedly encounters a voodoo cult, whose leader intends to take over the world with an army of zombies.

== Plot ==
Publisher Duncan Fairchild and his wife Coral compel and escort adventure novelist Tom Harris from Miami Beach to remote Voodoo Island in the Caribbean for researching an overdue new novel. After their plane runs out of fuel, Tom takes the controls from pilot Enrico and lands on the beach.

Tom heads to a house he spotted but stops to watch a young woman swim naked in a pond. A zombie appears but disappears after Tom dives in and swims toward it. After he asks a fisherman for help, the zombie attacks them with a machete, decapitating the fisherman. Tom shoots the zombie, to no effect, and it flees when armed men arrive in a Jeep. The leader, Charles Bentley, denies the existence of zombies, stating that the islanders are a simple people who cannot comprehend that a man could be "deranged of mind, a homicidal maniac."

Back at the plane, Duncan, Coral and Enrico are frightened by menacing islanders, but Charles orders them to secure the plane and introduces himself as the overseer of Voodoo Island. At Charles' home, Tom asks the housekeeper about voodoo drums and human sacrifice, but she feigns ignorance, as she is a member of the voodoo cult. Before dinner that night, Tom meets the woman he saw swimming: Janine Biladeau, the daughter of scientist Dr. Augustus Biladeau. Tom tells the group of the zombie attack and says he has heard the dead walk the island, but Augustus dismisses it, saying that the islanders use a plant-based narcotic that can cause physical and mental problems.

Tom and Janine go for a walk and are attacked by zombies, who attempt to abduct Janine. Charles tells Tom that Janine risks being sacrificed because she is a blonde virgin. Tom asks Janine to leave the island with him and the others the next day, but she refuses to leave her father behind. Meanwhile, the cult performs a ceremony, presided over by the masked Papa Neybo.

The next morning, Tom tells Duncan to gather everyone at the plane to escape. Janine has decided to go with them and to ask Augustus to leave as well. She takes Tom to Augustus's lab, but her friend Fernando warns them that she will be kidnapped and sacrificed. Augustus is in his lab experimenting with irradiated snake venom, which he hopes will cure cancer. He injects a man with it, who immediately transforms into a zombie. Augustus asks Tom to take Janine away, saying it's too late for him to leave, as zombies attack the lab.

Tom, Duncan and Enrico prepare for take-off as zombies grab Janine and Coral. As Enrico starts the plane, a zombie walks into its spinning propeller, carrying a box of explosives. The blast kills Enrico, destroying the airplane and zombie. Tom and Duncan dive into the sea to escape and encounter a motorboat. They then disguise themselves as voodoo cultists and go to the ceremony to save Janine. Unbeknownst to them, Augustus is watching, and just as Neybo is about to behead Janine, Augustus throws a knife, killing Neybo and revealing him to be Charles.

Tom, Janine, Coral, Duncan and Augustus race back to the lab, pursued by cultists and zombies. Augustus rigs his equipment so that it will blow up Voodoo Island, ending Charles's plan to take over the world with his zombie army. As they escape by boat, two cultists clamber aboard and stab Augustus before they are killed. Dying, Augustus explains that the zombies are the accidental result of his experiments, and when Charles discovered this, he hatched his scheme for world conquest. Augustus dies, the island explodes and the others sail back to Miami Beach.

== Cast ==
Character names provided below are uncredited on-screen.

- William Joyce as Tom Harris
- Heather Hewitt as Jeanine Biladeau
- Walter Coy as Charles Bentley
- Dan Stapleton as Duncan Fairchild
- Betty Hyatt Linton as Carol Fairchild
- Kirby Grant (credited as Robert Stanton) as Dr. Augustus Biladeau
- Vanoye Aikens
- Rebecca Oliver
- Matthew King
- George-Ann Williamson
- Don Strawn's Calypso Band

== Production ==
I Eat Your Skin was made by Del Tenney Productions. It is a regional film, defined by regional horror film specialist Brian Albright as one that is "(a) filmed outside of the general professional and geographic confines of Hollywood; (b) produced independently; and (c) made with a cast and crew made up primarily of residents of the states in which the film was shot." Although set on an island in the Caribbean, the movie was filmed in Miami Beach and Key Biscayne, Florida. Filming locations include the Hotel Fontainebleau and unspecified parks in Dade County.

Heather Hewitt appeared on the cover of the September 1964 Playboy.

Composer Lon E. Norman was then the music arranger of The Jackie Gleason Show that was shot in Miami.

Tenney's original intent was to release the film - then known as Zombies - on a double feature with Frankenstein Meets the Space Monster. I Eat Your Skin was produced on a $120,000 budget, but did not find a distributor and sat unreleased for six years. Tenney eventually sold the film to Gross for $40,000. Film critic and psychometrist Bryan Senn notes that "Even in 1964, shooting a horror film in black-and-white and expecting to find a decent distributor was an act of pure optimism." Senn adds that, when Tenney was asked in an interview what he thought of I Eat Your Skin, he "laughingly admitted, 'I didn't like it very much; I thought it was sort of silly.'"

In another interview, Tenney said that the film was shot in three weeks, not his "usual" two weeks because Twentieth Century Fox required him to use a union production crew. If he did not, he said, the company would not distribute the movie. Tenney felt that the union members were "slow and uncooperative." He also said that delays were caused by a hurricane and by members of the cast and crew needing medical treatment for snakebites and illnesses contracted in the Florida swamps during filming.

I Eat Your Skin was given a "parental warning" ratings by two organizations: a GP rating by the Motion Picture Association of America (MPAA), and an A-III rating by the Catholic News Service.

Academic film critic Peter Dendle notes several problems that point to the production phase of I Eat Your Skin. He writes that "All aspects of writing, staging, and dialog are hopelessly contrived." And as to the zombies themselves, he says that "The make-up effect consists of a coating of plaster over the face and neck (which apparently doesn't reflect decomposition, since it appears so quickly" and quotes James O'Neill as referring to them in his book Terror on Tape as "bug-eyed, crud-faced zombies".

== Distribution ==
I Eat Your Skin premiered in Los Angeles on May 5, 1971. It was distributed by Cinemation Industries to drive-in theatres with I Drink Your Blood on a "mandatory" double feature; i.e., theatre owners were required to show both films as a double feature. Trailers for the double feature only showed footage of I Drink Your Blood and made no mention of I Eat Your Skin being in black and white.

On TV, Elvira's Movie Macabre aired the film twice, the first time in 1981 when the program was still a local show in Los Angeles and again in 2011 when the program was in nationwide syndication. It was also shown on Temple University TV in July 2016 as part of the Saturday Night Fright Special. And the non-profit Arroyo Channel in Pasadena, California ran the film in July 2018 on its Horror Host Theatre-Bordello of Horror program.

The film was screened at the Mahoning Drive-In Theater in Lehighton, Pennsylvania on October 2, 2015 and at Quentin Tarantino's New Beverly Cinema in Los Angeles on January 10, 2017, both as a double feature with I Drink Your Blood. It was also screened as part of the Majestic Science Theatre 3000 film series at the Majestic Theatre in Corvallis, Oregon in October 2018.

== Reception ==
At the time of its release, BoxOffice magazine derided the film, calling it "as old-fashioned as any B picture made in the Forties" and noting that "There is very little anyone could find remotely objectionable here, even a 'nude' swim scene being made an obvious cover-up." It rated I Eat Your Skin as "fair" on its five-point very-poor-to-very-good scale, with The New York Daily News calling it "very poor".

In The Encyclopedia of Horror Movies, British film critic Phil Hardy briefly commented on the film, noting that, after failing to be distributed "for seven years," it was "put on a double-feature programme advertised as 'Two great blood horrors to rip out your guts.'"

In The Zombie Movie Encyclopedia, Dendle writes, "Never mind the title - this is as mild as horror gets," adding that it does have its good moments, such as "In an anomalously creative scene, a zombie blows up the protagonists' plane by casually walking into the propeller while holding a box of explosives - a zombie suicide bomber."

Senn writes that, "Compared to the mean-spirited I Drink Your Blood, Tenney's co-feature is downright enjoyable" with zombies that "provide a few genuine shudders, and so fulfill the first rule of zombie cinema - that dead people should be scary." However, he was critical of the film's technical aspects, observing that the movie is "flatly photographed and poorly lit" and that it "plays just below the competency level. Most scenes had to be overdubbed, and the poor-quality sound and (mis)matching show." He also called the jazz score "intrusive and quite often inappropriate".

In a review of the eight-film DVD box set Mad Monster Rally, David Cornelius of DVD Talk writes that "The film (...) went undistributed for six long years, and one look explains why: it's an utterly square attempt at early-60s hipness with a jazzy score and a hero (...) who fancies himself a [Sean Connery]-era James Bond, surrounding himself with platinum blondes." Cornelius goes on to say that "Tenney pads the picture with a couple exploitation scenes of witch doctor rituals, and we fall asleep".

Paul Pritchard of DVD Verdict simply calls I Eat Your Skin "just the type of cheap crap that sullies the good name of exploitation cinema."

Critic Glenn Kay noted the film had "bad effects, horrible dialogue, and a Muzak-inspired score", calling the movie "a goofball flick" and a "concoction [that] is fascinating, and like so many other films of the 1960s, it's almost entertaining in a so-bad-it's-good way."

British critic Jamie Russell's writes that I Eat Your Skin is a "laughable voodoo-esque tale" with "woeful zombies" that was "shelved for reasons obvious to anyone who has had the misfortune of sitting through it." However, he points out the film's historical place as part of the "bumper crop" of post-Night of the Living Dead movies, although adding that most of these movies "have slid into (mostly) deserved obscurity."

Several critics and authors have noted that, despite the title I Eat Your Skin, no skin is eaten during the film.

== In popular culture ==
In Orson Welles' film The Other Side of the Wind, unfinished during his lifetime and released posthumously in 2018, the marquee of a drive-in theater advertises the double feature of I Drink Your Blood and I Eat Your Skin.

RiffTrax released a comedic commentary track for the film on April 24, 2019.

== See also ==
- List of American films of 1964
