= Lynn Lowry =

American actress, screenwriter and producer (born 1947)

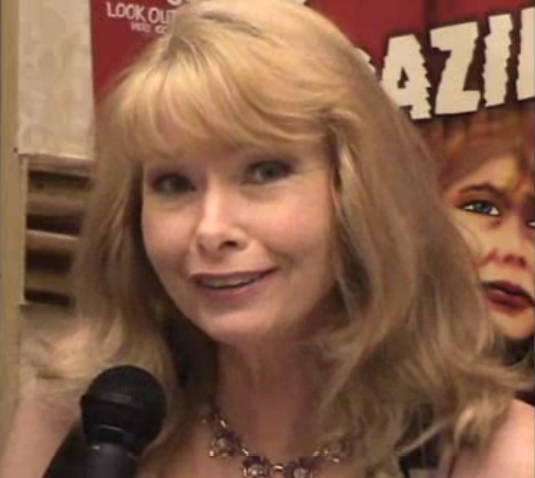
- Lowry interviewed by Count Gore de Vol in 2009
- Born: Linda Kay Lowry; October 15, 1947 (age 78); East St. Louis, Illinois, U.S.
- Occupations: Actress, screenwriter, film producer
- Years active: 1971–present
- Children: 1

Linda Kay "Lynn" Lowry (born October 15, 1947) is an American actress, screenwriter and producer. She is known for her work in horror films, having appeared in the cult films I Drink Your Blood (1970), George A. Romero's The Crazies (1973) and David Cronenberg's Shivers (1975).

== Early life ==
Lowry was born in East St. Louis, Illinois, and lived in Cahokia, Illinois, during her early childhood. At age twelve, she relocated with her family to Burbank, California and later, Atlanta, Georgia, where her father transferred for work.

Lowry enrolled at the University of Georgia on a scholarship in 1966, studying theater for two years. She later worked as a Playboy Bunny at the Atlanta Playboy Club, and gave birth to her son. In 1969, Lowry moved with her son to New York City, working as a bartender while auditioning for acting roles.

== Career ==
While auditioning for a role in Joe (1970) in New York City, Lowry met Lloyd Kaufman, who asked her to appear in a supporting part in The Battle of Love's Return (1971), which she accepted. After completing the film in early 1970, she was cast in David Durston's horror film I Drink Your Blood (1970).

Lowry appeared in two key 1970s horror films, George A. Romero's The Crazies (1973) and David Cronenberg's Shivers (1975), followed by a sixteen-month role as the adulterer-heroine Sandra Henderson on NBC's short-lived soap opera How to Survive a Marriage, as well as a brief part on the daytime serial Another World. Lowry was also one of the two female leads in Radley Metzger's film Score (1974). She also starred opposite Peter Fonda in Jonathan Demme's action thriller Fighting Mad (1976).

Lowry moved to Los Angeles in the early 1980s, but ended up largely abandoning her acting career after appearing in Cat People (1982). "I was in Hollywood and I just got tired of the bullshit," she said. "I wasn’t doing horror movies when I was in Hollywood, I was just going out for TV and other auditions and I got tired so I gave it up; I focused on doing theatre and even sang in a band."

After sporadic appearances in the 1980s and 1990s, Lowry returned to acting in 2005 and her subsequent films included Splatter Disco, Basement Jack and Schism, which she co-wrote and co-produced. In 2010, she had a cameo appearance in the remake of her earlier film The Crazies. Lowry also starred in Dante Tomaselli's Torture Chamber (2013). In 2015, she co-starred with Debbie Rochon in the horror film The House of Covered Mirrors. In 2022, Lowry starred as Gina Cochran in Richard Burgin's Fang, for which she won four film festival awards.

== Filmography ==
=== Films ===
Year	Title	Role	Notes
1971	I Drink Your Blood	Carrie	Uncredited
1971	The Battle of Love's Return	Dream Girl	
1973	Sugar Cookies	Alta Leigh / Julie Kent	
1973	The Crazies	Kathy Fulton	
1974	Score	Betsy	
1975	Shivers	Nurse Forsythe	
1976	Fighting Mad	Lorene Maddox	
1982	Cat People	Ruthie	
1995	Compelling Evidence	Julie	
2007	Splatter Disco	Alma	
2008	Beyond the Dunwich Horror	Margo Warren	
2008	Schism	Betsy / Jackie / Lola	
2009	George: A Zombie Intervention	Barbra	
2009	Basement Jack	Mrs. Riley	
2010	The Crazies	Woman on Bike	
2010	The Super	Maureen Rossi	
2010	Psychosomatika	Raeanne	
2011	The Theatre Bizarre	Mikela Da Vinci	
2012	The Haunting of Whaley House	Bethany Romero	
2013	The Trouble with Barry	Ruth Montenegro	
2013	My Stepbrother Is a Vampire!?!	Isabel	
2013	Torture Chamber	Lisa Marino	
2013	The Legend of Six Fingers	Ester	
2016	Model Hunger	Ginny Reilly	FANtastic Award for Best Actress in a Feature Film
2016	The House of Covered Mirrors	Claudia Hoffman	
2017	Descending	Eva	
2018	Cynthia	Nandula	
2018	The Sweetest Revenge	Jessica Moore	
2019	Essence - A Psychedelic Gothic Thriller	Deb	
2020	Never Can Say Goodbye: When Love and Hate Survive Death	Elaine	
2022	Fang	Gina Cochran	
2023	The Pocket Film of Superstitions	The Hand Maiden	
2024	A Halloween Feast	Angela Long	
2024	A Stranger in the Woods	Edith's grandmother	
2025	A Hard Place	Zenia	
2025	Bradlee	Bradlee's Mum	
