= Idaho Transfer =

1973 film by Peter Fonda

- Cover of the Dutch VHS release
- Directed by: Peter Fonda
- Screenplay by: Thomas Matthiesen
- Produced by: William Hayward
- Starring: Kelley Bohanon; Kevin Hearst; Dale Hopkins; Keith Carradine
- Cinematography: Bruce Logan
- Edited by: Chuck McClelland
- Music by: Bruce Langhorne
- Production company: The Pando Company
- Distributed by: Cinemation Industries
- Release date: June 15, 1973
- Running time: 86 minutes
- Country: United States
- Language: English
- Budget: $500,000

Idaho Transfer is a 1973 science fiction film directed by Peter Fonda. It stars Kelley Bohanon, Kevin Hearst, Dale Hopkins, and Keith Carradine.

It is the only film Fonda directed in which he did not appear.

== Plot summary ==
Teenager Karen Braden (Kelley Bohanon) is a troubled mental hospital outpatient who is taken by her father George and sister Isa to a government facility near the Craters of the Moon lava fields in Idaho. The project there was commissioned to develop matter transference, but made a different discovery: time travel. They also discovered that a mysterious ecological catastrophe will soon wipe out civilization.

The time travel process has negative health effects, though. Adults "not much older than 20" are unable to survive for long, as their kidneys hemorrhage shortly after the experience. So the scientists decide to only send young people 56 years into the future so they can build a new civilization.

After the government takes over the project, the transfer machines are turned off, trapping a large number of project members in the future. Now trapped, they begin exploring the future world. A survivor from the project is picked up by a family dressed in futuristic clothing. She is placed alive in the trunk of their car, there to be consumed as fuel for the vehicle. The small girl in the back seat asks what will happen when they run out of them (people from the past), "Will we have to use each other, then?"

== Cast ==
- Kelley Bohanon as Karen Braden
- Kevin Hearst as Ronald
- Caroline Hildebrand as Isa Braden
- Keith Carradine as Arthur
- Ted D'Arms as George Braden
- Judy Motulsky as Judy (credited as Judy Motolsky)
- Dale Hopkins as Leslie
- Fred Seagraves as Dr. Lewis
- Joe Newman as Cleve
- Susan Kelly as Nurse Nora
- Meridith Hull as Jennifer
- Roy B. Ayers as Elgin (credited as Roy Ayers)
- Kim Casper as Anne
- Debbie Scott as Joanna
- Devin Burke as Michael
- Earl Crabb as Evans

== Production ==
The film was produced by Peter Fonda's Pando Company, in association with Marrianne Santas; it was copyrighted to Kathleen Film Production Company in 1973.

The $500,000 film was self-financed by Fonda and starred mostly non-professional actors. Principal shooting took place in Arco, Idaho, Craters of the Moon National Monument and Preserve, and Bruneau Sand Dunes State Park. Castmember Earl Crabb also cites Bellevue, Idaho as a location. The film was shot after Fonda had finished directing The Hired Hand (1971) in August 1971.

The end credits conclude with the Latin phrase "Esto Perpetua". Translated, it means "Let it be perpetual" or "It is forever"; appropriate for a time travel film, it is also the motto of the state of Idaho.

Fonda also produced a documentary about the making of the film.

== Reception ==
Fonda said "The film was in release for only three weeks when the distributor (Cinemation) went bankrupt. The banks had the film for years. Luckily, I was able to retain the rights."

Reception of Idaho Transfer has been mixed. Time described it as a "very deliberate and closely controlled film graced with a slow, severe beauty that makes its quiet edge of panic all the more chilling", whereas Jay Robert Nash in The Motion Picture Guide declares it a "useless piece of drivel about an obnoxious group of teens".

Writing about Idaho Transfer retrospectively, Chuck Stephens of Cinema Scope described it as "A no-budget, deeply-stoned dystopian cousin to flower-power future shocks like John Carpenter's Dark Star (1974) and Jim McBride's Glen and Randa (1971)... a troubling puzzle of hippie bewilderment, written by little-known Thomas Matthiesen in the zonked and indeterminate Richard Brautigan/Rudy Wurlitzer prose stylings of the day."

== See also ==
- List of American films of 1973
