= William Joyce (actor) =

American actor

- William Joyce in I Eat Your Skin
- Born: October 21, 1930; Bryn Mawr, Pennsylvania
- Died: September 3, 1998 (aged 67); Encino, California
- Occupation: Actor
- Years active: 1950–1990
- Height: 6 ft 5 in (1.96 m)

William Joyce (October 21, 1930 – September 3, 1998) was an American actor. He was best known for playing Kellam Chandler in the American soap opera television series Days of Our Lives.

In 1959, Jack Webb picked him over Jimmy Dean to play the title role in a television adaptation of Johnny Guitar. That year he also played "Drew" in S1E11 of Bat Masterson.

A life member of The Actors Studio, Joyce's film roles included Senator Charles Carroll in The Parallax View and writer Tom Harris in I Eat Your Skin.

== Filmography ==
- Top Banana (1954) - Dancer (uncredited)
- The Wings of Eagles (1957) - Naval Aide (uncredited)
- This Could Be the Night (1957) - Bruce Cameron
- Man on Fire (1957) - Chamberlain (uncredited)
- Don't Go Near the Water (1957) - Lt. Boone (uncredited)
- Tales of Wells Fargo- The Legacy (1959) - Tom Casement
- Have Gun Will Travel- Day of the Badman (1960) - Laredo
- I Eat Your Skin (shot in 1964, released in 1971) - Tom Harris
- The Young Nurses (1973) - Fairbanks
- The Parallax View (1974) - Senator Charles Carroll
- Lifeguard (1976) - Lifeguard Captain
