= Teenage Mother =

- Theatrical release poster
- Directed by: Jerry Gross
- Written by: Nicholas Demetroles; Jerry Gross
- Produced by: Jerry Gross
- Starring: Arlene Sue Farber; Julia Angel; Howard Lee May
- Cinematography: Richard E. Brooks
- Music by: Steve Karmen
- Production company: Jerry Gross Productions
- Distributed by: Cinemation Industries
- Release date: January 1967
- Running time: 78 minutes
- Country: United States
- Language: English

Teenage Mother (also known as The Hygiene Story) is a 1967 American exploitation film directed by Jerry Gross and starring Arlene Sue Farber. It is about teenage pregnancy, hygiene and a graphic actualization of birth. It was billed as "The film that dares to explain what most parents can't." It marked Fred Willard's film debut.

== Reception ==
An author likened the film to an exploitation edition of the 2007 film Juno.

In a brief interview on the DVD extras of the 2007 documentary film Heckler, Willard reported the audience at one screening of the film booed after his character interrupted an attempted sexual assault.

== See also ==
- List of American films of 1967
- I Drink Your Blood
- Cinemation Industries
