= Fighting Mad (1976 film) =

1976 American film by Jonathan Demme

- Theatrical release poster by Joseph Smith
- Directed by: Jonathan Demme
- Written by: Jonathan Demme
- Story by: Roger Corman
- Produced by: Roger Corman
- Starring: Peter Fonda; Lynn Lowry; John Doucette; Philip Carey
- Cinematography: Michael W. Watkins
- Edited by: Anthony Magro
- Music by: Bruce Langhorne
- Production company: Santa Fe Productions
- Distributed by: 20th Century Fox
- Release date: June 28, 1976
- Running time: 88 minutes
- Country: United States
- Language: English
- Budget: $600,000

Fighting Mad is a 1976 American Southern Gothic vigilante thriller film written and directed by Jonathan Demme, who based his screenplay on an original story by producer Roger Corman. It stars Peter Fonda as an Arkansas farmer who uses guerrilla tactics against corrupt land developers attempting to evict his family and his neighbors in order to stripmine their land. The cast also features Lynn Lowry, John Doucette, Philip Carey, Noble Willingham and Scott Glenn.

== Plot ==
A corporation tries to pressure a bunch of Arkansas farmers and ranchers to sell their land so they can strip-mine it for coal. The fiercely proud and stubborn Hunter family refuse to give in. This leads to a bitter conflict that results in several casualties. Eventually the take-charge no-nonsense Tom Hunter exacts a harsh revenge on the villains with the help of his bow and arrow.

== Cast ==
- Peter Fonda as Tom Hunter
- Lynn Lowry as Lorene Maddox
- John Doucette as Jeff Hunter
- Philip Carey as Pierce Crabtree
- Harry Northup as Sheriff Len Skerritt
- Noble Willingham as Senator Hingle
- Kathleen Miller as Carolee Hunter
- Scott Glenn as Charlie Hunter
- Ted Markland as Hal Fraser
- Gino Franco as Dylan Hunter
- Peter Fain as Gillette
- Allan Wyatt as Judge O'Connor

== Production ==
The movie was one of four Roger Corman made for 20th Century Fox. In making the film, Corman analysed three other recent low-budget rural action thrillers that had been big hits: Billy Jack (1971), Walking Tall (1973) and Dirty Mary, Crazy Larry (1974). He deduced they had three things in common: a hero with an off-beat sidekick, an unusual mode of transport and an interesting weapon. This is why the Peter Fonda character travels on an old motorcycle with his toddler son and uses a compound bow. Corman said, "It was an attempt, once more, to follow a style that you're probably familiar with now — an action picture with a certain social comment."

Demme had made Caged Heat for Corman and was preparing the script for Fighting Mad when Corman asked him, at short notice, to take over Crazy Mama, whose director had left the project. Demme was reluctant but Corman threatened to abandon Fighting Mad if the director did not make Crazy Mama. Demme shot the film, which was a disappointment. He said Corman was unhappy with the result and canceled Fighting Mad. Demme protested this was unfair. Roger Corman agreed and changed his mind - Fighting Mad went ahead.

Filming took place on location in the Ozarks region of northwest Arkansas, with most scenes shot in rural Washington County, and around Fayetteville. Additional scenes were shot in neighboring Fort Smith and Clarksville.

Peter Fonda later wrote, "Like his work. Jonathan was amazing. He was so full of positive attitude, anything was possible. He never let on to any stress or pressure, and he was basically working for free."

== Release ==
The film was originally set to be released in June 1976, but was "pulled back" from release due to a less than favorable response. A new ad campaign was issued that emphasized the film's action over its environmental and political themes.

=== Home media ===
In 2011, the film was released on DVD by Shout Factory, on a double-bill with Moving Violation.

== Reception ==
The film was a box office disappointment.

In a retrospective review for Bright Wall/Dark Room, Justin LaLiberty writes:

"Demme never succumbs to the latent bloodlust of the genre’s audience; the violence of Fighting Mad is quick and to the point. He doesn’t linger on its aftermath but, rather, its consequences. Demme was a consummate humanitarian; what interested him wasn’t what an arrow would look like sticking out of someone’s neck, but what would actually push someone to do that to another person.... Demme made an exploitation film about peace, and it’s one of his best, most exciting pieces of work."
