= Fang (2022 film) =

2022 American horror film directed by Richard Burgin

- Directed by: Richard Burgin
- Written by: Richard Burgin
- Produced by: Robert Felker
- Starring: Dylan LaRay; Lynn Lowry; Jess Paul; Tom White
- Cinematography: Jason Kraynek
- Edited by: Chad Halvorsen; Robert Felker
- Music by: Zak Ferguson; Richard Burgin; Robert Felker
- Production company: Chicago Sky View Productions
- Distributed by: Malevolent Dark
- Release date: November 29, 2022
- Running time: 98 minutes
- Country: United States
- Language: English

Fang is a 2022 American psychological body horror film written and directed by Richard Burgin, starring Dylan LaRay, Lynn Lowry, Jess Paul, and Tom White. Fang tells the story of a young autistic man who, after living with the stress of his mother's Parkinson's disease, starts to believe that he's turning into a rat.

== Plot ==
23-year-old Billy Cochran is a cartoonist who lives with his mother Gina in a decaying industrial neighborhood in Chicago. Billy frequently uses prescription drugs and works at a meat processing warehouse, where he faces a demanding and unsympathetic boss, Mr. Wolfson. Gina's condition worsens dramatically, culminating in a crisis where she collapses and is hospitalized. Dr. Decanthian reveals that Gina has Stage 5 Parkinson's disease, emphasizing that she needs 24/7 care. Billy disassociates while hearing about Gina's diagnosis, flashing back to a dead rat he found in a field.

Billy becomes attracted to Gina's new caregiver, Myra Valenti. Despite the initial awkwardness between them, Myra shows an interest in Billy's drawings. Billy describes in great detail the sci-fi story he created in his drawings, about alien hybrid creatures named Graixians who live on the planet Graix in the distant future. Billy and Myra are interrupted by Gina, who demands that Billy change the TV channel for her. Gina shows signs of hallucinating, believing that she was at the Baltimore Airport while she was stuck on the floor at home. Later that night, Billy discovers a rat in his bathtub and chases it around the living room. Billy gets bitten by the rat and is then hospitalized, where he's given a new kind of mixed tetanus shot. Billy starts to notice strange bumps and wounds on his skin. Unaware that Billy was in the hospital, Mr. Wolfson warns him not to skip work.

After a confrontation with Gina where she involuntarily urinates on the floor, Billy leaves to take a bath. He tears off a piece of his skin and notices a chunk of rat fur underneath. Billy draws an illustration of the rat fur in his notebook and shows it to Myra. Unsure what to make of the drawing, Myra assures Billy that it was most likely a paranoid reaction. After having a panic attack during dinner, Billy goes to the bathroom and finds more extensive rat fur growing on his body. At a bar, Billy tries to socialize with his co-workers Danny and Jeff, only to be disturbed by a vision of the Rat King, a humanoid creature with a giant rat head.

Gina confronts Billy, imagining that he didn't empty their dishwasher, leading to an intense argument between them where she claims to have never loved him. Billy responds by throwing a water glass at Gina, yelling, then retreating to his bedroom. Gina comes into Billy's room while hallucinating that he is Sam, his dead father, and sexually assaults Billy. After the trauma of the assault, Billy discovers a more extensive growth of rat fur on his back. He has a nightmare where he meets another humanoid rat creature, Dr. Rat, who chants "We need red meat." The line between hallucinations and reality becomes increasingly blurred, as Gina tells Billy she doesn't remember their intense argument from the night before. Billy notices that the water glass he threw at Gina is on the table, fully intact.

At work, Mr. Wolfson tells Billy about the upcoming health and safety inspection of his warehouse, and asks Billy to hide bank documents for him. Late in the day, Billy overhears Mr. Wolfson talking on the phone about how he has $500,000 in cash at his house. Billy buys a lockpick and hunting knife at a hardware store, before revealing to Myra that he plans to break into Mr. Wolfson's house and steal his money. Myra tries to convince Billy not to commit the burglary, but he refuses to be dissauded.

During the health and safety inspection, Billy successfully breaks into Mr. Wolfson's house and finds large amounts of cash in a bedroom closet. As Billy leaves Mr. Wolfson's house, he has a sudden hallucination of the Rat King appearing on the living room TV as a talk show guest, and has a mental breakdown. When Mr. Wolfson unexpectedly arrives home, Billy lunges at him, stabbing him to death with his hunting knife. When Billy gets home, he finds Gina stuck in an immobile position. Billy stabs her repeatedly, pulls out her intestines, and cannibalizes her. After eating part of Gina's intestines, Billy briefly transforms into a humanoid rat creature. Myra comes home, discovers that Billy killed Gina, and calls the police.

Billy is sentenced to stay in a mental hospital, where he gets diagnosed with autism, schizophrenia, and severe psychosis. A drawing of a humanoid rat creature is shown hanging on the wall of Billy's padded cell.

== Cast ==
- Dylan LaRay as Billy Cochran
- Lynn Lowry as Gina Cochran
- Jess Paul as Myra Valenti
- Tom White as Mr. Wolfson
- Pete Berwick as Danny
- Glenn Mitchell as Jeff
- Hilary Bass as Dr. Decanthian
- Morgan Bass as the Rat King
- Richard Burgin as Dr. Rat
- Nik Macik as Ron Larkin
- Karen Donohue as Joanna Prince
- Louis DeRosa as Duke
- Gabriel Fries as Cliff the Hardware Salesman
- Michael Angelo Gonzalez as the Announcer
- Meghan Martinez as the Nurse
- Robert Felker as the Safety Inspector

== Production ==
Fang was filmed in Chicago, Cicero, and Lockport, Illinois from January 10, 2020, to February 7, 2020. Filming took place over 23 days. An additional day of filming took place on December 13, 2019, in West Palm Beach, Florida, to film The Ron Larkin Show talk show sequences for Fang. Jason Kraynek was director of photography during the production of Fang, while Robert Felker was line producer.

== Release ==
Fang premiered at the Davis Theater on November 29, 2022. Fang was distributed through a partnership between Richard Burgin and David Rokita of Malevolent Dark. David Rokita, Tom Deaver, Richard Burgin, and John Joseph Dunn were executive producers of Fang. Richard Burgin recorded the director's commentary track for Fang with Isabela Rangel.

=== Critical reception ===
The film received mostly positive reviews. David Gelmini of Dread Central gave Fang 5/5 stars and wrote, "With its dedicated central performances and its abundance of nightmarish imagery, Fang is quite possibly one of the best independent horror films to come along in quite some time."

Lisa Marie Bowman of Through the Shattered Lens wrote, "Fang is a well-directed, well-acted, and well-visualized portrayal of life on the fringes of society, one that captures both the timeless theme of loneliness and the uniquely paranoid atmosphere of today."

Giles Edwards of 366 Weird Movies gave Fang a "Recommended" review, adding, "Please take the "Recommended" notice with this warning: Fang is very painful at times; but its most painful moments are its most impressive."

Bryan Kristopowitz of 411Mania gave Fang a very positive review, writing, "Fang is a masterpiece. A horror movie for the ages with two of the best performances you will see in anything. Dylan LaRay and especially Lynn Lowry should be up for all sorts of awards and recognition, as well as director Burgin."

Don Anelli of Don's World of Horror was more critical, describing Fang as a "somewhat flawed genre effort" and "problematic for what it is", while adding, "Among the better aspects at play here is the genuine sympathy elicited throughout here as this tries to make us care for what's going on."

=== Accolades ===
Fang won 13 film festival awards, with an additional 15 nominations, including 8 nominations and 1 award at the FANtastic Film Festival in San Diego, 5 nominations and 4 awards at the Milwaukee Twisted Dreams Festival, and the Shawna Spirit Award at The Shawna Shea Film Festival in Massachusetts.

Award	Year	Category	Recipient	Notes	Result
Buffalo Dreams Fantastic Film Festival	2023	Best Actress	Lynn Lowry		Nominated
Midwest Monster Film Fest	2023	Best Actor	Dylan LaRay		Won
Midwest Monster Film Fest	2023	Best Actress	Lynn Lowry		Won
Midwest Monster Film Fest	2023	Best Director	Richard Burgin		Won
The Shawna Shea Film Festival	2023	Best Performance	Dylan LaRay Lynn Lowry		Won
The Shawna Shea Film Festival	2023	Best Feature Length Film	Richard Burgin Robert Felker		Nominated
The Shawna Shea Film Festival	2023	Best Genre Feature	Richard Burgin Robert Felker		Won
