= Stigma (1972 film) =

1972 film by David E. Durston

- Directed by: David E. Durston
- Written by: David E. Durston
- Produced by: Charles Moss
- Starring: Philip Michael Thomas; Harlan Cary Poe; Josie Johnson
- Cinematography: Robert M. Baldwin
- Edited by: Murray Solomon
- Music by: Jacques Urbont
- Release date: 1972
- Running time: 93 minutes
- Country: United States
- Language: English

Stigma is a 1972 American drama film. Produced by Charles Moss, while it was both written and directed by David E. Durston. Prominent themes in the film include racism and sexually transmitted disease. It stars Philip Michael Thomas in one of his early screen appearances, twelve years before he starred in the popular 1980s TV show Miami Vice.

== Plot ==
Set in a remote California community, the story follows a doctor (Philip Michael Thomas) who learns a super form of syphilis is appearing among the residents. He and a few others must race against time to find the carrier before others fall victim.

== Reception ==
The New York Times called it "a crackling good suspense melodrama." Similarly, the Los Angeles Times called it a "lively little drama... sturdy and involving." In contrast, Leonard Maltin rated the film a "bomb," dismissing it as an "absurd melodrama."

== See also ==
- List of American films of 1972
