= Buc Wheats =

Breakfast cereal made by General Mills

Buc Wheats was a boxed breakfast cereal produced by General Mills in the United States from 1971 until the early 1980s. The cereal consisted of toasted wheat flakes (originally made with buckwheat) with a sweet maple-flavored glaze baked onto them. After several years in production, General Mills replaced the maple glaze with a honey flavored glaze, an unpopular change; sales fell, and General Mills discontinued production of the cereal around 1983.

== Nutritional value ==
According to the 1970s cereal boxes, Buc Wheats cereal was highly nutritious and contained 100% of the minimum daily requirements for vitamins and iron.

== About ==
Buc Wheats cereal contained wheat flakes mixed with buckwheat and had the appearance of bran flakes, having a similar color and texture, but were lighter in weight. Buc Wheats was coated with a maple syrup glaze, giving it a unique flavor. General Mills replaced the original maple glaze with a honey glaze. The new Buc Wheats were said to taste like a sweet and sticky bowl of Wheaties. Most consumers did not like the change.

== Advertisement ==
In 1974 Steve Karmen, a New York City composer, produced a catchy little song for Buc Wheats titled, "Feelin' Like A Million Bucks".
