= I Drink Your Blood =

1971 American exploitation horror film by David E. Durston

- Theatrical release poster advertising a double feature of I Drink Your Blood and I Eat Your Skin
- Directed by: David Durston
- Written by: David Durston
- Produced by: Jerry Gross
- Starring: Bhaskar Roy Chowdhury; Jadine Wong; Rhonda Fultz; Riley Mills
- Cinematography: Jacques Demarecaux
- Edited by: Lyman Hallowell
- Music by: Clay Pitts
- Production company: Jerry Gross Productions
- Distributed by: Cinemation Industries
- Release dates: January 20, 1971 (North Carolina); May 7, 1971 (Los Angeles)
- Running time: 90 minutes
- Country: United States
- Language: English

I Drink Your Blood is a 1971 American hippie exploitation horror film written and directed by David E. Durston, produced by Jerry Gross, and starring Bhaskar Roy Chowdhury, Jadine Wong, and Lynn Lowry. The film centers on a small town that is overrun by rabies-infected members of a Satanic hippie cult after a revenge plot goes horribly wrong.

The story was inspired by reports of an incident in a mountain village in Iran in which a pack of rabid wolves attacked a schoolhouse, infecting people with rabies. Further inspiration came from coverage of the trial of Charles Manson. Principal photography took place in Sharon Springs, New York over eight weeks, with the cast consisting of mostly unknown and amateur actors.

I Drink Your Blood was marketed and released as a double feature with Del Tenney's previously unreleased 1964 film Zombies, which Gross had acquired and retitled I Eat Your Skin. I Drink Your Blood was one of the first films to receive an X-rating from the Motion Picture Association of America based on violence rather than on nudity. Since its initial release, the film has received generally mixed-to-positive reviews; some critics praised Chowdhury's performance and the film's ability to shock, while others have criticized its explicit violence. I Drink Your Blood has garnered a cult following and is widely cited as a classic exploitation film.

A remake, which was to be produced by and star Sybil Danning with Durston returning as director, was announced in 2009, but was cancelled after Durston's death.

== Plot ==
Horace Bones, the leader of a Manson-like cult of hippies, conducts a Satanic ritual in the woods. Local girl Sylvia, who has befriended cult member Andy, secretly observes the ritual. Sylvia is seen by the cult and flees, but is caught and raped by several of the cultists. Sylvia emerges from the woods the next morning, beaten and traumatized. She is found by her younger brother Pete and Mildred, who runs the local bakery. They return Sylvia to her grandfather, Doc Banner. Mildred seeks help from her boyfriend Roger Davis, leader of a construction crew working on a nearby dam. The cult members' van breaks down, forcing them to remain in the town. They buy pies from Mildred, who explains that, as most of the town is deserted and awaiting demolition, they can stay in any vacant building they wish.

Learning of the assault on Sylvia, Banner confronts the cult, but they assault him and force him to take LSD. Horace initially wants to kill Banner, however, Pete and cult member Sue-Lin intervene and Banner is released. Enraged by the incident, Pete takes a shotgun to get revenge but encounters and kills a rabid dog. Pete takes some of the dead dog's blood, then injects it into meat pies at the bakery and sells them to the cult members. After eating the contaminated pies, the cultists begin to showing signs of infection and lapse into violent behavior.

One of the cultists panics and runs into the night. She is picked up by construction workers sent by Roger to investigate. She parties with the group and has sex with some of them, before showing signs of infection. Molly also absconds with Carrie, another cult member. Two construction workers investigate the house occupied by the cultists, and Horace kills them.

Andy and Sylvia, who have made peace, are discovered at the Banner house by Pete, who admits what he has done. Meanwhile, Banner has reported the potential rabies epidemic and is joined by Dr. Oakes, the town doctor. Banner, Oakes, and Roger soon discover that the entire construction crew is infected with rabies, and are pursued by the mob until they reach a water-filled quarry, which frightens the attackers off.

Molly and Carrie emerge from the woods and are taken in by a concerned homeowner. Carrie soon begins showing signs of being infected and attacks the homeowner with a knife.

Andy helps Sylvia and Pete escape after they discover Banner dead in the barn, impaled on a pitchfork. They encounter Molly, who commits suicide after learning that she has rabies. Horace encounters Sue-Lin, but she escapes his attempt to kill her by committing suicide via immolation. Horace and Sue-Lin loyalist Rollo engage in a fight, allowing Andy, Sylvia, and Pete to escape. Rollo soon gains the upper hand and impales Horace with a sword. Andy, Sylvia, and Pete encounter Mildred, who has barricaded herself in the bakery. As Mildred opens the barricade, Andy is killed by one of the rabid construction workers. Sylvia and Pete retreat with Mildred to the basement, with one of the rabid townsfolk managing to get through, where he is subsequently killed by Mildred. The group leaves the bakery to escape in Mildred's car, but crowds of the rabid cultists and the townsfolk converge on them, overturning the car. Oakes arrives with reinforcements and guns down the infected. Mildred, Sylvia, and Pete then emerge from the car, shaken but otherwise unharmed.

== Cast ==
- Bhaskar Roy Chowdhury as Horace Bones
- Jadin Wong as Sue-Lin
- Rhonda Fultz as Molly
- George Patterson as Rollo
- Riley Mills as Pete Banner
- John Damon as Roger Davis
- Elizabeth Marner-Brooks as Mildred Nash
- Richard Bowler as Doc Banner
- Tyde Kierney as Andy
- Iris Brooks as Blonde Cult Member
- Alex Mann as Shelly
- Bruno Damon as Rabid Guy
- Mike Gentry as Rabid Guy
- Arlene Farber as Sylvia Banner †
- Lynn Lowry as Carrie †
- David E. Durston as Dr. Oakes †
† uncredited

== Production ==
=== Development ===
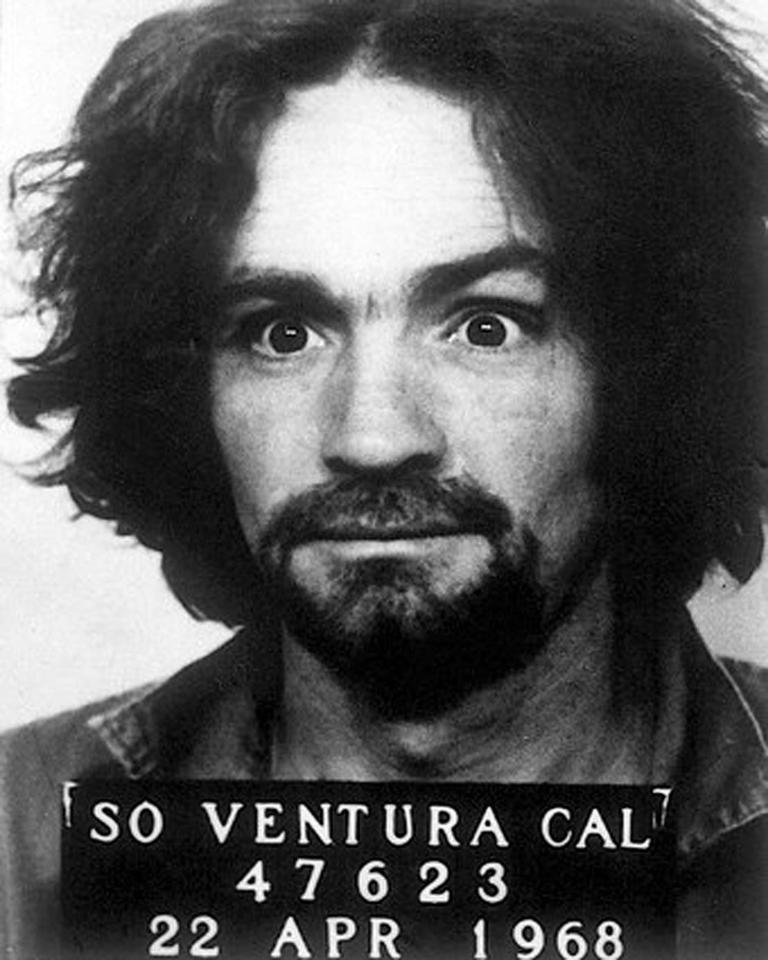
The character of Horace Bones was inspired by criminal and cult leader Charles Manson.

I Drink Your Blood was written and directed by David E. Durston. Development for the film began in 1970 when Durston was contacted by Jerry Gross, the CEO of Cinemation Industries and a producer of exploitation films. Gross asked Durston to write and direct a low-budget horror film. Durston had previously directed several sexploitation films and American Broadcasting Company's financially successful TV series Tales of Tomorrow (1951-1953). According to Durston, "[Gross] said he wanted to make the most graphic horror film ever produced, but he didn't want any vampires, man-made monsters, werewolves, mad doctors, or little people". Gross had been impressed by Durston's work in Tales of Tomorrow and made a deal with Durston that if he came up with a good idea, he would double his previous writing and directing contract with the Guilds.

For three weeks, Durston struggled with writer's block until reading a newspaper article on an incident involving a mountain village in Iran. According to Durston, the article described an incident where a pack of rabid wolves attacked a schoolhouse occupied by 18-19 children and two teachers. Fascinated by the idea, Durston contacted a doctor who was an authority on the disease and had visited the village. He was shown 8mm footage that the doctor had taken during his work at the village of the infected children locked in cages and foaming at the mouth. As Durston stated: "It made the hair on the back of my head elevate. I had never seen anything so horrible, yet so real, in my life". Inspired by the sense that no film had ever been made about a rabies epidemic, Durston wrote a story outline centered on a small town overrun by the disease. Durston pitched the idea to Gross, who liked the concept and immediately greenlit the project.

The development of the script took eight weeks, during which Durston made frequent additions and revisions in subsequent drafts over an additional five-week period. Further inspiration for the film came from coverage of the trial of Charles Manson. Using the high publicity generated from the trial, Durston rewrote the script, creating the character Horace Bones, a Manson-like leader of a Satanic cult of hippies that terrorizes the town. According to Durston, the character Horace Bones created a real threat to the town, as well as adding scenes that genuinely shocked the audience. Impressed with the film's script, Gross authorized Durston to begin pre-production.

=== Casting ===
Many of the cast members of I Drink Your Blood were unknown and had limited experience in the film industry. The film was distinctive for its multi-ethnic cast, with members of the Satanic gang portrayed by black, white, Chinese, and Indian actors. For the film's major villain, Horace Bones, actor and Indian dancer Bhaskar Roy Chowdhury was cast. Several critics have cited Bhaskar's performance as Horace Bones as being one of the film's significant assets. Bhaskar would later star in Durston's next film Blue Sextet, and would provide audio commentary in Grindhouse Releasing, and MTI Home Video's release of the film in 2003 before his death on August 4 that same year. Arlene Farber and Lynn Lowry were also cast in the film in uncredited roles, with Lowry making her screen debut in the film. Both actresses would go on to star in major motion pictures. Farber, Gross' wife, had starred in several of her husband's previous films, and later starred as Angie Boca in William Friedkin's critically acclaimed 1971 film The French Connection and the 1974 made-for-television film All the Kind Strangers. Lowry would eventually star in such films as George A. Romero's The Crazies, Radley Metzger's Score, David Cronenberg's Shivers and Paul Schrader's remake of Cat People.

=== Filming ===
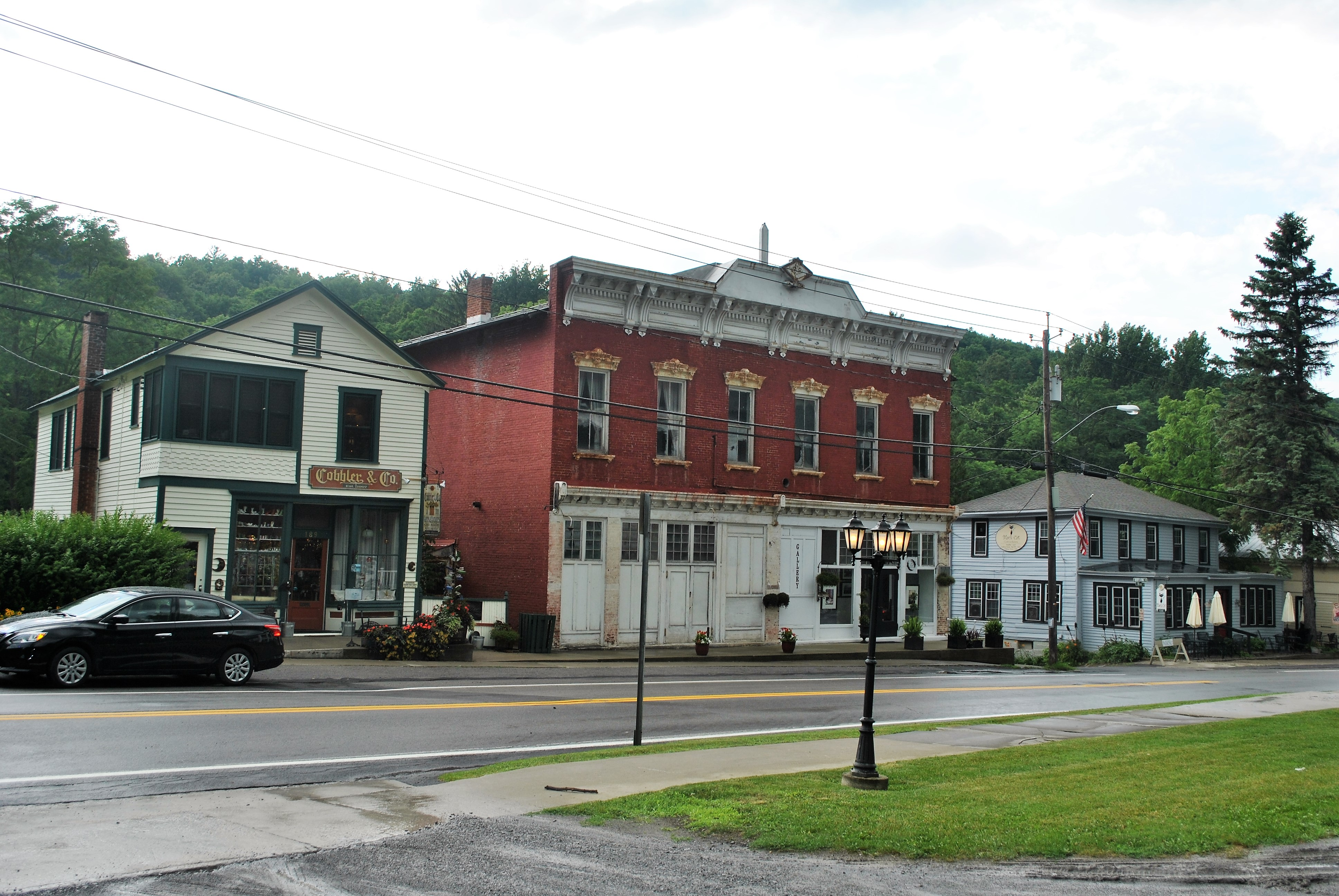
The film was shot on location in Sharon Springs, a small town in upstate New York.

Principal photography for I Drink Your Blood commenced later that year and was shot on location during a period of eight consecutive weeks in Sharon Springs, New York. By the time of the production, Sharon Springs, once famous as a summer spa town, had largely become a ghost town and the producers were allowed to use the abandoned hotels as locations. Durston became friends with the town sheriff, who helped the crew during filming. Durston later cast him in a bit role as the sheriff seen in the film's climax.

One of the town's locations used in the film was the Roosevelt, an old hotel that was scheduled for demolition within the next couple of months. The crew paid the town $300 for use of the hotel, which, according to Durston, they practically tore down themselves. Due in part to the film's relatively low budget, most of the effects and stunts were practical, and the cast performed their own. For scenes involving rats, trained rats were brought in, while dead rats were purchased from a local medical center and painted to match the trained rats' color. Several of the trained rats featured in the film would later be used in the 1971 horror film Willard and its 1972 sequel Ben. During the course of filming, tensions between the town locals and the film's cast and crew mounted because of the locals' uncertainty and misunderstandings with the film's director. After one incident in which the locals witnessed Durston attempting to motivate actress Iris Brooks for an emotional scene, they contacted the town sheriff, insisting that Durston was abusing the cast and crew and should be arrested or replaced with another director. Nonetheless, Durston remained the film's director throughout filming.

== Release ==
I Drink Your Blood was marketed and released as a double feature with Del Tenney's 1964 film Zombies, (Note: Tenney's film had also gone under the alternate title Voodoo Blood Bath before Gross bought the rights to the film in 1970.) which had been retitled I Eat Your Skin by Gross after he had acquired it. The double feature was marketed a year after the trial and conviction of Charles Manson and his accomplices, Manson having been an inspiration for the character of Horace Bones, with producer Gross wanting to cash in on the public's recent fascination with the case. As a part of his deal with Gross, Durston did not receive a percentage of the film's profits, but was paid double his established directing salary. Although the film was marketed under the now-infamous title I Drink Your Blood, Durston had originally intended to release the film under the title Phobia or Hydro-Phobia. However, during the film's marketing, Gross changed the film's name to its current title; Gross had not consulted or informed Durston of the change before releasing the film under the title, which bears no real connection to the actual film. It premiered in North Carolina on January 20, 1971, and in Los Angeles on May 7, 1971. Durston had originally intended for the film to play only in drive-ins. Gross, however, without informing Durston, had the film screened at the first class Warner Brothers Theatre in Broadway.

=== Censorship ===
I Drink Your Blood was one of the first films to receive an X-rating from the Motion Picture Association of America based on violence rather than nudity. Several scenes needed to be altered to qualify the film for an "R", so the producer distributed the original film, asking that each projectionist censor the film as they saw fit for their market. However, BoxOffice magazine reported in January 1971 that the Code and Ratings Appeals Board re-rated the film R "after hearing an appeal at which time the film's distributor...agreed to make certain cuts and insert additional footage at the request of the MPAA".

=== Home video ===
I Drink Your Blood was released on VHS by Cinemation Industries on July 20, 2004. Bob Murawski of Grindhouse Releasing sought out Durston, and the two collaborated on the official release of I Drink Your Blood on DVD in North America through Murawski's Box Office Spectaculars distribution company, which continues to hold the worldwide rights to the film. In an interview with U.K. website SexGoreMutants, Murawski announced that the company's release of the film would feature several never-before-seen sequences that producer Gross had cut from the film before its completion, as well as the film's original ending which was deemed "too violent and downbeat". A director's cut of the film was released on DVD on November 9, 2004, and again on October 31, 2006, by MTI Home Video and Grindhouse Releasing, respectively. These cuts included scenes and material that was cut from the film during its theatrical release. The film's original cut was released on DVD by Cheezy Flicks on October 25, 2005. On September 23, 2016, Grindhouse announced that they would be releasing the film for the first time on HD Blu-ray on November 22, later that year. The release added new audio commentary and interviews with the film's cast and crew, the original theatrical trailer and radio spots. The release also included the fully restored feature films I Eat Your Skin and Blue Sextet.

== Reception ==
"I think the reason audiences reacted to it so dramatically was because it was a violent story that could probably have happened. The violence was not far-fetched or unmotivated...the more audiences can identify with a situation that might happen to them or could happen to them, the bigger the scare."

— Writer/director David Durston on audience members' reactions to the film's violence

I Drink Your Blood has received mixed to positive reviews from critics, with some critics praising its ability to shock as well as Bhaskar's performance as Horace Bones, while other critics have critiqued the film's explicit violence.

Bill Landis and Michelle Clifford in their book Sleazoid Express called it "the pinnacle of the blood horror movie", praising Bhaskar's performances as well as the film's direction, violence, and soundtrack. The authors Tom Milne and Paul Willemen in their book Encyclopedia of Horror Movies wrote that "as the film now stands what looks like it might have been a raw, ferocious thriller has become a frustrating exercise in splicing, incessantly building up to scenes of bone-crushing horror and violence which never actually happen". Kevin Thomas of The Los Angeles Times praised the film, calling it "a tour de force of a caliber not equaled since the similar The Night of the Living Dead". Cavett Binion from The New York Times gave the film a positive review, calling the film "an intense and well-made Exploitation item". Scott Weinberg from DVD Talk wrote that the film is "Energetic, sloppy and entirely watchable... [It is] true-blue camp all the way. Plus it's vicious, violent, and frequently fall-down funny".

Author and film critic Leonard Maltin gave the film a mixed review, awarding it two out of four stars. Donald Guarisco from AllMovie gave the film a mixed review, criticizing the film's thin characterizations, inconsistent acting, and dialogue. However, Guarisco also stated that the film manages to overcome its flaws through the delivery of its premise, summarizing, "In the end, I Drink Your Blood is too demented and rough-edged for the casual viewer, but it will delight horror fans with a sweet tooth for schlock". TV Guide awarded the film 1/5 stars, with the reviewer stating that although the film was "surprisingly well made", it was also bizarre and gross. The Blockbuster Entertainment Guide gave the film 2/4 stars, calling it "demented".

== Legacy ==
I Drink Your Blood has gained a cult following over the years and is now considered a classic exploitation film. It bears some resemblance to several later films, including David Cronenberg's Rabid (1976) and George Romero's The Crazies (1973), which starred I Drink Your Blood actress Lynn Lowry and the latter was remade in 2010. Both films share a similar premise to Durston's film, which has been noted by authors Jonathan Rigby and Stephen Thrower.

I Drink Your Blood has been screened in multiple film festivals over the years in celebration of the film. It was screened at the Northwest Horror Show in Vancouver on April 23, 2019. The screening of the film was then followed by a Q&A with actress Lynn Lowry. On May 25, later that year, it was screened at the Alamo Drafthouse Cinema, which was then followed by a Q&A with Lowry. On October 26, 2008, the film was screened at the Night Visions Film Festival as a part of its "Maximum Halloween" program. It was later screened at the Moolah Theatre & Lounge as a part of the "Late Nite Grindhouse" on September 16 and 17 in 2016. In 2016, as a part of the company's promotion of their upcoming Blu-ray release of the film, Grindhouse Releasing screened the film at multiple film festivals from September 23 to December 3.

=== Cancelled remake ===
On September 17, 2009, it was announced that Durston planned to remake the film, which would be produced by, and star, Sybil Danning. In an interview with Fangoria, Durston stated that he had not originally thought about remaking the film: "I wasn't thinking about a remake until these offers started coming through. I turned all of them down, because their budgets were too small. I decided that if I Drink Your Blood would be remade, it should be better than the original, so that people really had something to see if they went to see it again." Durston further explained that the remake would retain most of the elements from the original film, though its violence would be "updated". While admitting that he would not be directing the film, Durston stated that he had already begun the process of writing the film's script. However, the project was cancelled before production could begin following Durston's death in 2010 at the age of 88.

== See also ==
- List of films featuring hallucinogens

== Bibliography ==
- Albright, Brian (October 19, 2012). Regional Horror Films, 1958-1990: A State-by-State Guide with Interviews. McFarland. ISBN 978-0-7864-7227-7.
- Deal, David (January 27, 2015). Television Fright Films of the 1970s. McFarland. ISBN 978-0-7864-5514-0.
- Drake, Temple; Kerekes, David (2004). Headpress Guide to the Counter Culture: A Sourcebook for Modern Readers. Headpress. ISBN 978-1-900486-35-4.
- Gardenour Walter, Brenda (June 30, 2015). Our Old Monsters: Witches, Werewolves and Vampires from Medieval Theology to Horror Cinema. McFarland. ISBN 978-0-7864-7680-0.
- The Blockbuster Entertainment Guide to Movies and Videos: 1999 Edition. Island Books. 1998. ISBN 978-0-440-22598-0.
- Landis, Bill; Clifford, Michelle (November 19, 2002). Sleazoid express: a mind-twisting tour through the grindhouse cinema of Times Square. Simon & Schuster. ISBN 978-0-7432-1583-1.
- Lentz III, Harris (April 20, 2004). Obituaries in the Performing Arts, 2003: Film, Television, Radio, Theatre, Dance, Music, Cartoons and Pop Culture. McFarland. ISBN 978-0-7864-1756-8.
- Lisanti, Thomas (May 7, 2015). Hollywood Surf and Beach Movies: The First Wave, 1959-1969. McFarland. ISBN 978-1-4766-0142-7.
- Harchick, Jonathan (October 28, 2013). Leonard Maltin's 2014 Movie Guide: Leonard Maltin's Movie Guide. Createspace Independent Pub. ISBN 978-1-4936-2083-8.
- Milne, Tom; Willemen, Paul (1986). The Encyclopedia of Horror Movies. Harper & Row. ISBN 978-0-06-055050-9.
- Pulliam, June Michele; Fonseca, Anthony J. (June 19, 2014). Encyclopedia of the Zombie: The Walking Dead in Popular Culture and Myth: The Walking Dead in Popular Culture and Myth. Greenwood. ISBN 978-1-4408-0389-5.
- Rhodes, Gary (September 3, 2015). Horror at the Drive-In: Essays in Popular Americana. McFarland. ISBN 978-1-4766-1051-1.
- Rigby, Jonathan (2011). Studies in Terror: Landmarks of Horror Cinema. Signum Books. ISBN 978-0-9566534-4-4.
- Schreck, Nikolas (2001). The Satanic Screen: An Illustrated Guide to the Devil in Cinema. Creation. ISBN 978-1-84068-043-0.
- Senn, Bryan (March 26, 2015). A Year of Fear: A Day-by-Day Guide to 366 Horror Films. McFarland. ISBN 978-1-4766-1090-0.
- Senn, Bryan (March 5, 2019). "Twice the Thrills! Twice the Chills!": Horror and Science Fiction Double Features, 1955-1974. McFarland. ISBN 978-1-4766-6894-9.
- Stine, Scott Aaron (November 20, 2015). The Gorehound's Guide to Splatter Films of the 1960s and 1970s. McFarland. ISBN 978-0-7864-9140-7.
- Thomas, Kevin (May 7, 1971). "MOVIE REVIEW: 'Blood,' 'Skin' Twin Bill". Los Angeles, California: Associated Press. The Los Angeles Times. p. 90.
- Thrower, Stephen (July 24, 2007). Nightmare USA: The Untold Story of the Exploitation Independents. FAB Press. ISBN 978-1-903254-52-3.

=== Further reading ===
- Cooper, Ian. The Manson Family on Film and Television. Jefferson, North Carolina: McFarland & Company. pp. 60–4.
- Schwartz, Karola. "Drinking blood with Walter Benjamin and David Durston". In Rhodes, Gary D. (ed.). Horror at the Drive-In: Essays in Popular Americana. Jefferson, North Carolina: McFarland & Company. pp. 277–96.
