= A Stranger in the Woods =

2024 Hungarian-American horror film

- Promotional release poster
- Directed by: József Gallai
- Written by: József Gallai
- Story by: József Gallai; Beáta Boldog
- Produced by: Tracy Allen; Beáta Boldog; József Gallai; Tommy Lentsch; Roxanne Rix; Eric Ziegmont
- Starring: Bill Oberst Jr.; Laura Ellen Wilson; Lynn Lowry
- Production companies: McClurg Productions; Nguyen Bros. Production; Elekes Pictures; Rix Cafe Texican; Lentsch Productions
- Distributed by: BayView Entertainment
- Release date: April 30, 2024
- Running time: 83 minutes
- Countries: Hungary; United States
- Language: English

A Stranger in the Woods is a 2024 American found footage horror film written and directed by József Gallai, from a story by Gallai and Beáta Boldog. It stars Bill Oberst Jr. as a reclusive man living alone in the woods and Laura Ellen Wilson as a film student who travels to document his life, with Lynn Lowry in a supporting role. It was released digitally by BayView Entertainment on April 30, 2024.

The film screened as part of the official lineup at the 2024 Haunted House FearFest, where it won five awards including the festival's top prize. It drew largely positive notices from genre critics, who particularly praised Oberst's performance.

== Plot ==
Edith, a British film student, travels to an isolated woodland house in the United States to make a documentary about Victor Browning, a former taxi driver who has withdrawn from society for decades. The two form a rapport, and it emerges that Edith has suffered tragedies of her own. As her stay continues, Victor's behaviour grows increasingly erratic and details of his past begin to surface, and their relationship turns.

== Cast ==
- Bill Oberst Jr. as Victor Browning
- Laura Ellen Wilson as Edith
- Lynn Lowry as Edith's grandmother
- Shawn Michael Clankie as Professor Gregory
- József Gallai as Peter
- Scott Cassin
- Marvin Maddicks Jr.
- Fountainblue Tielman
- Tracy Allen

== Production ==
Gallai co-wrote the screenplay with Beáta Boldog, his wife. The pair began developing the story around a larger group of characters, set it aside during the COVID-19 pandemic, and returned to it at the end of 2022, narrowing the focus to Victor and Edith. Gallai chose the found footage format to approach the sub-genre differently from his earlier films, citing Willow Creek and Creep as stylistic influences and describing the film as a character study that emphasises atmosphere over jump scares. Filming was completed in December 2023, and Gallai described the result as "basically a one-location film", a format he had not worked in much before.

Special makeup effects were by Kamilla Mira Kovács, with Bálint Szántó as script supervisor, Dániel Vince as weapons master and Sándor Gál as trailer editor. András Babodi, Gergő Elekes and Bálint Szántó worked as still photographers. The soundtrack features four songs by Eric Ziegmont's State of Shock ("Showdown (Down Ya Go)", "Our Love Is Gone", "Watch Your Mouth" and "Hard for the Heart"), along with "Two Ghost Town" by Dane E. Connor.

== Release ==
The film was included in the official film and television lineup for the 2024 Haunted House FearFest, held in October 2024 at the Triad Theatre in New York City. It screened at the 2024 Chicago Horror Film Festival in Chicago on May 4, 2024, presented as a Bill Oberst Jr. double feature, and at the 10th Wreak Havoc Horror Film Festival in Winston-Salem, North Carolina on September 14, 2024.

BayView Entertainment released the film for digital purchase, video on demand and subscription streaming on April 30, 2024. A Blu-ray edition followed on July 30, 2024. The film later became available on advertising-supported and subscription platforms including Tubi and Plex.

== Reception ==
Writing for Dread Central, David Gelmini said Oberst "delivers one of the best performances of his career", describing the actor's work as subtle and unsettling and calling the film's deliberate pace effective in developing the relationship between the two leads. He also praised Wilson's portrayal of Edith.

Terry Sherwood of Film Threat called the film "a gripping experience despite some minor shortcomings", noting that Oberst's performance and appearance evoke Max Schreck and reading the story as a retelling of the opening of Bram Stoker's Dracula. Sherwood praised the isolated setting and the leads' chemistry, but criticised a sequence of police body camera footage as tonally jarring and found the ending rushed.

Romey Norton of Film Focus Online described the film as "a smart, slow-burning take on found footage horror". Michael Li of Film Purgatory and Jim McLennan of Film Blitz both highlighted the atmosphere and pacing while noting the deliberate slowness of the first two acts. Surya Komal of Just for Movie Freaks and a reviewer for Nerdly also assessed the film, the latter in a review of its video-on-demand release.

PopHorror published two reviews. Stef Harrison described the film as maintaining "a sense of dread around every corner", while a second review called it "a compelling narrative" exploring isolation and secrecy.

== Accolades ==
Award	Year	Category	Recipient(s)	Result
Chicago Horror Film Festival	2024	Best Horror Feature	Film	Nominated
Chicago Horror Film Festival	2024	Best Actor (Feature)	Bill Oberst Jr.	Nominated
Chicago Horror Film Festival	2024	Best Psychopath	Bill Oberst Jr.	Nominated
The Shawna Shea Film Festival	2024	Outstanding Performance	Bill Oberst Jr.	Won
The Shawna Shea Film Festival	2024	Best Horror Feature	Film	Nominated
The Shawna Shea Film Festival	2024	Best International Feature	Film	Nominated
The Shawna Shea Film Festival	2024	Best Director	József Gallai	Nominated
Wreak Havoc Horror Film Festival	2024	Best Actor	Bill Oberst Jr.	Won
Wreak Havoc Horror Film Festival	2024	Best Feature	Film	Nominated
Wreak Havoc Horror Film Festival	2024	Best Director	József Gallai	Nominated
Wreak Havoc Horror Film Festival	2024	Best Actress	Laura Ellen Wilson	Nominated
Wreak Havoc Horror Film Festival	2024	Best Score	Dane E. Connor and Eric Ziegmont	Nominated
Haunted House FearFest	2024	The Grim Reaper Award (Best of the Fest)	Film	Won
Haunted House FearFest	2024	Best Horror Feature	Film	Won
Haunted House FearFest	2024	Best Director	József Gallai	Won
Haunted House FearFest	2024	Best Actor in a Drama	Bill Oberst Jr.	Won
Haunted House FearFest	2024	Best Actress in a Drama	Laura Ellen Wilson	Won
Shockfest Film Festival	2024	Honorary mention	Film	Won
Sacred Crypt Awards	2025	Best Feature Film	Film	Nominated
Sacred Crypt Awards	2025	Best Horror Lead	Bill Oberst Jr.	Nominated
Sacred Crypt Awards	2025	Best Horror Support	Laura Ellen Wilson	Nominated
Sacred Crypt Awards	2025	Best Horror Director	József Gallai	Nominated
