= What Do You Say to a Naked Lady? =

1970 film by Allen Funt

- Theatrical poster
- Directed by: Allen Funt
- Written by: Allen Funt
- Produced by: Richard Briglia (assistant producer)
- Narrated by: Allen Funt
- Cinematography: Urs Furrer, Gil Geller, Tom Mangravire, George Silano
- Edited by: Arnold Friedman, Irving Winter
- Music by: Steve Karmen
- Production company: Allen Funt Productions
- Distributed by: United Artists
- Release date: February 18, 1970
- Running time: 85 minutes
- Country: United States
- Language: English
- Box office: $5 million (US/Canada rentals)

What Do You Say to a Naked Lady? is a 1970 American hidden-camera style reality film directed by Candid Camera creator Allen Funt. In the film, Funt secretly records people's reactions to unexpected encounters with nudity or sexuality in unusual situations.

The film does contain some titillating material and both male and female full frontal nudity, but much of it involves Funt talking to people about sexuality and sexual topics. Whereas Funt's other productions had to fall within Federal Communications Commission guidelines prohibiting nudity and sexual content on the airwaves, this film was outside the FCC's jurisdiction and Funt was free to incorporate them into the film.

In the U.S., the film was originally rated X by the Motion Picture Association of America; an edited version was rated R in 1982. When submitted to the British Board of Film Classification in 1970, the film was originally rejected, then rated X; a 1988 video release was rated 18.

The film was released on VHS in the 1980s, with a DVD released in 2011.

== Cast ==
- Joie Addison as Girl in Elevator
- Laura Huston as Girl on the Ladder
- Martin Meyers as The Tailor
- Karil Daniels as Girl Who Is Not Raped
- Donna Whitfield as Interracial Couple
- Richard Roundtree as Interracial Couple
- Susanna Clemm as Girl in the Keyhole
- Norman Manzon as Male Model
- Joan Bell as Lecturer

== Reception ==
Roger Greenspun of The New York Times reported that although "a few naked ladies do appear," the film "is mostly given over to verbal teases, to more or less straight interviews about sex, and to tributes to the cuteness of little kids." Greenspun said the film usually "tries milking laughs from the device of asking expert opinion of people who don't know what they are talking about. The results range from the dully ridiculous to the unspeakably vulgar. At its lowest moment, the film allows three loud, stupid, ugly old women to discuss their reactions to (I believe) 'I Am Curious (Yellow).'" Variety wrote, "This could have been done as well with suggested nudity or even partial exposure, but Funt confronts several supposedly uninformed individuals with a completely naked female as they're emerging from an elevator. The results, initially, are funny, but quickly reach the point of seeming repetitious." Gene Siskel of the Chicago Tribune gave the film 3 stars out of 4 and wrote that he was not looking forward to seeing it because "I expected a peep show. Instead, I found 'Naked Lady' to be a fresh look at stale attitudes." Kevin Thomas of the Los Angeles Times wondered what took Funt so long to do a project like this one, but now that he had, "the results not surprisingly are hilarious beyond anything he could dare present on television." Gary Arnold of The Washington Post wrote, "As a sex survey, the film is inconclusive and only sporadically funny, but Funt has probably hit on the kind of exploitation movie that will appeal to the broad popular audience." Brian Davis of The Monthly Film Bulletin wrote, "Funt's initial idea of confronting office workers with a completely naked woman is undeniably diverting, but the potential of this particular notion is strictly limited, and his subsequent devices for causing innocent citizens sexual embarrassment become increasingly desperate."

== See also ==
- List of American films of 1970
- Actuality film
