= Steve Karmen =

American composer (born 1937)

- Born: January 31, 1937 (age 89); Bronx, New York City, New York, U.S.
- Known for: Jingles
- Notable work: "I Love New York" "Here Comes the King"
- Children: 3

Steve Karmen (born January 31, 1937) is an American composer known for his jingles, including "I Love New York", "Call Nationwide, 'Cause Nationwide Is On Your Side", and "Here Comes the King." The King of Jingles, as he is informally known, has written more than 2,000 advertising jingles and is the recipient of 16 advertising Clio Awards. Prior to working in advertising, Karmen was a Calypso singer and scored soundtracks for nudie films such as The Candidate (1964) and What Do You Say to a Naked Lady? (1970).

== Early life and education ==
Karmen was born in the Bronx, New York into a conservative family, the son of a civil engineer and an accountant. His older brother, Arthur, was a physician involved in the discovery of alanine transaminase. Their mother was Jewish and their father Hyman was a Russian immigrant who worked as a civil servant for more than 40 years. Karmen attended Bronx High School of Science, where he met Bobby Darin. After high school, they performed in Manhattan clubs as a duo. Darin was given a record deal and their friendship fell apart; it wasn't until nearly 20 years later that the two reconnected and reconciled. Their friendship is the subject of Karmen's 2003 memoir Me and Bobby D.

Karmen finished one semester of medical school at New York University before abandoning his goal of being a brain surgeon. In 1957, he released "She Had Wild Eyes and Tender Lips," which he promoted on American Bandstand. He later pursued acting at American Theatre Wing. Karmen is also a self-taught guitarist and saxophonist.

== Career ==
Karmen worked as a Calypso singer and appeared on Talent Scouts in 1957. Though he lost, host Arthur Godfrey was impressed with his performance and Karmen performed on the Arthur Godfrey Time twice a day for three weeks. Art Davis encouraged him to travel to Trinidad, where he might find better success as a Calypso singer, and Karmen worked on a cruise ship for two months.

Karman moved to Los Angeles, intent on pursuing a career in acting after feeling out of sync with music trends, but returned to New York within ten months. He found himself composing and editing for nudie films, which gave him the opportunity to learn about composing on-the-job. He appeared in one film, Jukebox Racket, as a "boy hero" and not in any "touchy scenes." He orchestrated a total of 30 film scores, including Teenage Mother and Smorgasbroad.

While working on the nudie films, Karmen was hired to write music for a Girl Scouts commercial in 1966. His big break in the jingles industry was "You can take Salem out of the country, but..." for the cigarette company Salem. He wrote the jingle for Hershey's first-ever advertisement in 1970. Karman gave Hershey's bars to a group of children, which inspired his jingle, "There's nothing like the face of a kid eating a chocolate bar." By 1976, he owned his own firm, Steven Karmen Productions, Inc.

After his wife died from cancer in 1974, Karmen took a professional hiatus to spend time with his daughters. When he returned, he began working on his own album, We've All Been There, which he wrote for "emotionally tormented men and women" dealing with loss. In 1978, he told The Tampa Tribune that the "biggest restriction" of writing jingles is that he was largely barred from tapping into deeper emotions, something he felt he achieved only in his public service advertisements, which he pointed out only run in the middle of the night. He avoided writing music for political campaigns, claiming to have turned down Richard Nixon in 1972 and Gerald Ford in 1976. In 1995, however, he wrote two free songs for a hospital association that approached him to ask about writing music to "[fight] proposed Medicaid and Medicare cuts." In general, he was wary of the impact of political messages but felt that the healthcare cuts "superseded money."

=== Royalties ===
In 1978, Karmen, the "King of Jingles," was thought to be the highest-paid jingle writer in advertising, charging a $10,000 minimum initial creative fee. Karmen's reputation for quality work and a quick turnaround, as well as his promise not to work for his clients' competitors, gave him the success needed to set his own contract terms, which was highly unusual. Unlike other writers, who were typically paid a one-time flat fee for unlimited airings, Karmen retained copyright of his work, meaning he was paid residuals and that he had the ability to sell his songs to the record industry if he wanted to. He told The New York Times in 1989 that "90% of agencies" were unwilling to hire him because of this; by this point, however, Hershey, Budweiser, and Michelob were already among his repeat clients.

His 1989 book Through the Jingle Jungle, published by Billboard Books, was written as a guide to the jingle industry, taking readers from the early stages of pitching to retaining composers' rights and bringing in residuals. In the 1990s, he began experiencing pushback from the courts regarding his earnings, with district courts ruling in both 1992 and 1993 that Karmen was not entitled to a higher royalty. The Appeals Court for the Second Circuit affirmed these decisions in 1994.

== Personal life ==
Karmen and his wife Mary married c. 1961 and had three daughters. She died of colon cancer in 1974. In 1976, he was living in Bedford Hills, New York, about 50 miles from New York City with his daughters. He identified as a Liberal Democrat in 1996. In 2007, he lived in Westchester, New York.

== Awards ==
- 1971 – Clio Award: "You've Said It All" (Budweiser) and Tijuana Smalls commercials
- 1979 – Clio Award, Best Music with Lyrics – Opening/Tag Category: "I Love New York"
- 2012 – Binghamton University: Honorary degree

== Selected discography ==
=== Jingles ===
- 1969 – "Call Nationwide, 'Cause Nationwide Is On Your Side" (Nationwide Insurance)
- 1969 – "There's Nothing Like The Face Of A Kid Eating A Hershey Bar" (Hershey)
- 1970 – "Here Comes The King" (Budweiser)
- 1971 – "The Land of Pleasant Living" (National Bohemian)
- 1977 – "I Love New York" (New York Tourism)
- 1979 – "Ford, That's Incredible!" (Ford)

=== Film scores ===
- 1964 – The Candidate
- 1967 – Teenage Mother
- 1970 – What Do You Say to a Naked Lady?
- 1981 – Paternity

== Bibliography ==
- The Jingle Man (1980). Hal Leonard Corporation, ISBN 0-88188-239-9
- Through the Jingle Jungle (1989). Billboard Books, ISBN 0-8230-7707-1
- Me and Bobby D.: A Memoir (2003). Hal Leonard Corporation, ISBN 0-634-04876-7
- Who Killed the Jingle? – How a Unique American Art Form Disappeared (2005). Hal Leonard Corporation, ISBN 0-634-06656-0
