= David E. Durston =

American director and screenwriter

- Born: David Edward Durston; September 10, 1921
- Died: May 6, 2010 (aged 88); West Hollywood, California
- Other name: Ed Durston
- Occupations: Film director, screenwriter
- Years active: 1964–1978

David E. Durston (September 10, 1921 – May 6, 2010) was an American screenwriter and film director best known for directing the Charles Manson-inspired, horror movie I Drink Your Blood, released in 1971.

== Career ==
Durston wrote and directed for the famous television series Playhouse 90 (1956-1960). He appeared in the DuMont Television Network series Chez Paree Revue in 1950.

In 1965, he directed The Love Statue, which dealt with LSD use. His next feature was the 1971 exploitation horror movie I Drink Your Blood, about a cult of Manson Family-esque Satan-worshipping hippies who, after becoming infected with rabies, turn into zombies.

Durston followed this with the dramas Blue Sextet (1971) and Stigma (1972), then shifted his career to hardcore gay porn with Boy 'Napped! (1975) and Manhole (1978), the latter of which was not released due to one of its cast members being cast in Escape from Alcatraz, as the association between him and gay pornography would hurt both his career and the Clint Eastwood film he'd appeared in later.

In later years, Durston attempted to develop a modernized remake of I Drink Your Blood, but the project was cancelled after his death.

== Death ==
Durston died on May 6, 2010, of complications from pneumonia.

== Filmography ==
As film director:

- Felicia (1964)
- The Love Statue (1965)
- I Drink Your Blood (1971)
- Blue Sextet (1971)
- Stigma (1972)
- Boy 'Napped! (1975, as Spencer Logan)
- Manhole (1978)

As screenwriter:

- The Love Statue (1965)
- I Drink Your Blood (1971)
- Blue Sextet (1971)
- Stigma (1972)
- Boy 'Napped! (1975, as Spencer Logan)
