= Here Comes the King =

Advertising jingle

"Here Comes the King" is a well-known advertising jingle written for Budweiser, whose slogan is "The King of Beers." Budweiser is the flagship brand of the Anheuser-Busch brewery.

Copyrighted in 1971, the music and lyrics are by Steve Karmen, who also wrote six other jingles for Anheuser-Busch. The song is often heard as the theme for the brand's winter-themed TV commercials featuring the Budweiser Clydesdale horses pulling the Budweiser beer wagon.

== "When You Say Budweiser, You've Said It All" ==
Another Budweiser jingle, "When You Say Budweiser, You've Said It All," also with music and lyrics by Steve Karmen, was published a year earlier in 1970, and part of its lyric inspired "Here Comes the King."

The underlying instrumental is imitative of a stereotypical Bohemian polka band. Its style resembles the famous Coca-Cola jingle "I'd Like to Teach the World to Sing" in that it begins with a lone voice, joined by another singer, and eventually a choral group (Both songs can be heard on the CD, Tee Vee Toons: The Commercials). Many of the lines are punctuated at the end by a double drumbeat.

The award-winning anthem was a hit from the moment it first aired. Sonny & Cher recorded a song titled, "When You Say Love", written by two country songwriters using the tune of this jingle, and in 1972, it reached number 32 on the Billboard Hot 100 chart and number 2 on the Easy Listening chart. (Karmen successfully sued the songwriters for copyright infringement.) In 1976 and 1977, the Budweiser company was sponsoring Lou Rawls's live shows, and Rawls could be heard at the time singing on television commercials for the company.

== See also ==
- When You Hear Lou, You've Heard It All 1977 Lou Rawls album
- Lou Rawls Live 1978 Lou Rawls live album, which includes a short performance of the original "When You Say Budweiser, You've Said It All" jingle
