= Cinemation Industries =

American film studio and distributor

- Industry: Exploitation film studio
- Founded: 1965
- Founder: Jerry Gross
- Defunct: 1976
- Fate: Bankruptcy
- Headquarters: New York City, United States

Cinemation Industries was a New York City-based film studio and distributor owned, run and founded by exploitation film producer Jerry Gross.

== History ==
Gross released Girl on a Chain Gang (1966) and achieved success with Cinemation's release of sexploitation films such as Inga and Fanny Hill (both 1968). Among other films, the company has distributed exploitation films such as Shanty Tramp (1967), Teenage Mother (1967), and The Cheerleaders (1973) as well as two blaxploitation films The Black Six (1974), and The Black Godfather (1974).

The company, however, also distributed unexpected smash hit independent films like Melvin Van Peebles' Sweet Sweetback's Baadasssss Song (1971) and Ralph Bakshi's Fritz the Cat (1972). Other films released by the distributor include Peter Fonda's Idaho Transfer (1973), Freddie Francis' Son of Dracula (1974), Alain Resnais' Stavisky (1975), and the film version of Oh! Calcutta! (1972). It handled the American rights for the Italian animated feature The Magic Bird, originally titled Putiferio va alla guerra.

The company went bankrupt in late 1975, and all of its films in its catalog have been distributed by other companies. Jerry Gross resurfaced (after reportedly working as a clerk at a 7-Eleven store) a few years later with a new company, the Jerry Gross Organization.
