= Tijuana Smalls =

Brand of flavored cigarette

Tijuana Smalls is a brand of flavored cigarettes that was produced after a prohibition on advertising cigarettes on television in the United States that was signed into law by President Richard Nixon in 1970. These flavored cigarettes were advertised as "Little Cigars." The brand's jingle contained the lyrics, "Tijuana Smalls, ten for the road baby, for you maybe, you know who you are, you know who you are." The revised lyrics were written by Susan Dias Karnovsky.

According to a New York Times article, the brand was introduced in Boston on January 12, 1970, by the General Cigar Company. The introduction was facilitated by the advertising firm Ogilvy and Mather.

== Cultural references ==
This brand of cigarettes was mentioned in the chorus of Primus song "Shake Hands with Beef" on the Brown Album (1997).

In the mid-1970s, "Wacky Packages" used a parody called "Tijuana Smells" among its stickers.
