= La Fauxmagerie =

Vegan cheese shop

La Fauxmagerie Ltd
- The company's logo
- Formation: January 11, 2019; 7 years ago
- Headquarters: Shoreditch, London
- Parent organization: Honestly Tasty
- Website: lafauxmagerie.co.uk

La Fauxmagerie Ltd (from French faux "false" or "imitation" and fromagerie "cheese shop") is the UK's first vegan cheese shop. It sells plant-based substitutes for dairy cheese, operating a retail store in London's Shoreditch area as well as selling online and wholesale. Founded in 2019, the shop's range includes vegan versions of Camembert, Cheddar, goat cheese, blue cheese, and feta. La Fauxmagerie received press attention in 2019 after Dairy UK, a lobby group, threatened to sue them over the use of the phrase "plant-based cheese". It is operated by the Welsh siblings Rachel and Charlotte Stevens. Both founders follow a vegan diet and play an active role in the day to day running of their Shoreditch store and product development.

== History ==
Founders Rachel and Charlotte Stevens met some of their future suppliers at Vegfest UK in 2017 while searching for better quality plant-based products. They opened La Fauxmagerie in London's Brixton district in 2019 and quickly gained a loyal customer following, outgrowing their first store within 6 months. They moved to a much larger store in the Brick Lane area in Shoreditch, London, in June 2019 and launched their e-commerce offering in the same month.

La Fauxmagerie grew significantly in its first 3 years, expanding their retail and online offering, launching their own brand of aged plant-based cheeses, and opening London's first dedicated vegan wine and cheese bar - The Cheese Cellar, which is situated beneath their Shoreditch store. In May 2022, the company started supplying Waitrose supermarkets.

In 2023, Purezza acquired a majority stake in the company.

In 2025, vegan cheesemaker Honestly Tasty acquired the La Fauxmagerie brand. Following the acquisition, the official website moved to lafauxmagerie.co.uk. The brand is no longer affiliated with the former lafauxmagerie.com domain, which has since been replaced by Saporia, owned by Purezza.

== See also ==
- Jay&Joy, the first vegan cheese producer in France
- Dr Mannah's, a German vegan cheese producer founded in 2012
