= Miyoko =

- Gender: Female

Origin
- Origin: Japanese
- Meaning: Different meanings depending on the kanji used

Other names
- Alternative spelling: meyoko
- Nickname: yoki

Miyoko (written: 美代子, 三代子, 実世子 or みよ子) is a feminine Japanese given name.

== Persons with the name ==
Notable people with the name include:

- Miyoko Akaza (赤座 美代子; born 1944), Japanese actress
- Miyoko Asada (浅田 美代子; born 1956), Japanese actress
- Miyoko Asahina (朝比奈 三代子; born 1969), Japanese retired long-distance runner
- Miyoko Asō (麻生 美代子; 1926–2018), Japanese voice actress
- Miyoko Azuma (東 美代子; born 1945), Japanese swimmer
- Miyoko Hirose (広瀬 美代子; born 1959), Japanese former volleyball player
- Miyoko Hiroyasu (廣󠄁安 美代子; 1911–2025), Japanese supercentenarian
- Miyoko Ito, (1918–1983) American artist
- Miyoko Karami (唐見 実世子; born 1974), Japanese road cyclist
- Miyoko Kudō (工藤 美代子; born 1950), Japanese non-fiction writer
- Miyoko Matsutani (松谷 みよ子; 1926–2015), Japanese picture book author and folktale researcher
- Miyoko Mitsui (三井 美代子; 1919–2007), Japanese hurdler
- Miyoko Schinner, (born 1957) American-Japanese founder and CEO of Miyoko's Creamery
- Miyoko Sumida, (1948–2012) Japanese killer
- Miyoko Takishita (泷下 美代子), survivor and robbery victim of a Singapore Oriental Hotel murder case in 1994
- Miyoko Watai (渡井 美代子; born 1945), Japanese women's chess champion

== Fictional characters ==
- Miyoko Nonohana is one of the characters of Kiteretsu Daihyakka.

== Other uses ==
- Miyoko's Creamery
