= Veganz =

First vegan supermarket chain in Europe

Planethic Group AG
- Formerly: Veganz GmbH (2011–2019); Veganz Group AG (2019–2025)
- Type: AG (public limited company)
- Traded as: FWB: VEZ (Scale segment); ISIN DE000A3E5ED2
- Industry: Plant-based food
- Founded: 2011; 15 years ago in Berlin Prenzlauer Berg, Germany
- Founder: Jan Bredack and Juliane Kindler
- Headquarters: Ludwigsfelde, Brandenburg, Germany
- Area served: DACH
- Key people: Sascha Voigt (CEO); Jan Bredack (founder)
- Products: vegan groceries
- Brands: Veganz, Mililk
- Revenue: €10.8 million (2024)
- Number of employees: approx. 74 (2025)
- Website: Planethic.de

Planethic Group AG, known until 2025 as Veganz Group AG and before 2019 as Veganz GmbH, is a German plant-based food company based in Ludwigsfelde, Brandenburg. Jan Bredack and Juliane Kindler founded it in Berlin in 2011 as a vegan supermarket, which the company and contemporary press described as the start of Europe's first vegan supermarket chain.

The supermarket chain did not survive. Its retail subsidiary became insolvent in 2016/17, after which Veganz sold its own branded products through supermarkets and drugstores instead; the last company-owned store, on Warschauer Straße in Berlin, was sold in December 2023. The company converted from a GmbH into an Aktiengesellschaft in 2019, issued a 7.5% bond in 2020 and listed on the Scale segment of the Frankfurt Stock Exchange in November 2021 at €87 per share. Group revenue fell from €30.4 million in 2021 to €10.8 million in 2024.

In 2025 the company renamed itself Planethic Group AG and moved its operating brands, among them Veganz and the oat drink Mililk, into separate subsidiaries. The holding company filed for insolvency under self administration (Eigenverwaltung) on 25 June 2026; the proceedings were opened in September 2026. The operating subsidiaries are not part of the proceedings.

== History ==
Old company logo Veganz now brand logo

=== Supermarket chain (2011–2017) ===
Bredack, a former senior manager at Mercedes-Benz, and Kindler opened the first Veganz store in Berlin Prenzlauer Berg in the summer of 2011, on 250 square metres. They wanted to bundle vegan products in one shop to simplify vegan grocery shopping. Bredack told the Berliner Zeitung that he had expected about 100 customers a day; the store averaged around 400.

The company opened more stores in Germany and other European countries, but sales did not keep pace with the expansion. The retail subsidiary was declared bankrupt in 2016/17 and most stores closed. For several years Veganz kept a small number of stores in Berlin and one in Prague while it shifted its focus to wholesale.

=== Own brand and wholesale (2015–2023) ===
Veganz launched its own product brand in the spring of 2015. By the end of that year the range covered about 50 plant-based products, with roughly 100 more added in 2016. As of 2020, the company offered around 165 products in 26 countries. Group revenue grew by 28% to €26.6 million in 2019.

The GmbH was converted into an Aktiengesellschaft in 2019. Before going public, the company raised capital from small investors, first through crowdfunding campaigns in 2018 and 2019 and then through a 7.5% corporate bond issued in 2020.

Production moved to Ludwigsfelde in Brandenburg at the beginning of 2023, after plans for a larger plant in Werder (Havel) had been dropped over construction costs. In December 2023 Veganz sold its retail business, including the last store on Warschauer Straße in Berlin, and left retail entirely.

=== Frankfurt listing and decline (2021–2024) ===
Veganz went public on the Scale segment of the Frankfurt Stock Exchange on 10 November 2021. The final offer price was €87.00 per share, at the bottom of the €85 to €110 range, and the offering had a volume of about €47.6 million.

Business developed worse than planned after the listing. Revenue declined in every following year:

Group revenue
Year	Revenue (€ million)
2019	26.6
2021	30.4
2022	23.6
2023	16.4
2024	10.8

The 2024 annual report showed a 34% revenue drop against 2023, though with a smaller loss than in earlier years. The company could not repay its €10 million bond at maturity: in December 2024 a bondholders' meeting extended the bond, originally due in 2025, to February 2030 and suspended the interest payments for 2025.

=== Planethic Group and insolvency (2025–2026) ===
The annual general meeting in August 2025 approved renaming the company Planethic Group AG; the new name was entered in the commercial register in September 2025. Veganz continued as a consumer brand. The company reorganised itself as a holding whose operating brands, Veganz, Mililk, Happy Cheeze and Peas on Earth, sit in separate subsidiaries.

In the first half of 2025 the group reported revenue of €2.0 million. Reported earnings were positive only because of a one-off book gain from selling its OrbiFarm vertical-farming subsidiary; adjusted for that effect, the group still made an operating loss.

Bredack stepped down as CEO at the end of September 2025. After a brief tenure by his successor Rajan Tegtmeier, supervisory board member Sascha Voigt took over as CEO in November 2025.

In February 2026 the company missed payments on the restructured bond, and a further bondholders' meeting was cancelled. On 25 June 2026 Planethic Group AG filed for insolvency under self-administration. The filing covered only the holding company; the operating subsidiaries were not affected. The proceedings were opened in September 2026. Management said that Voigt and Bredack were funding operations during the restructuring and that the company aimed to complete its conversion into an investment holding by the end of 2026.

== Products ==
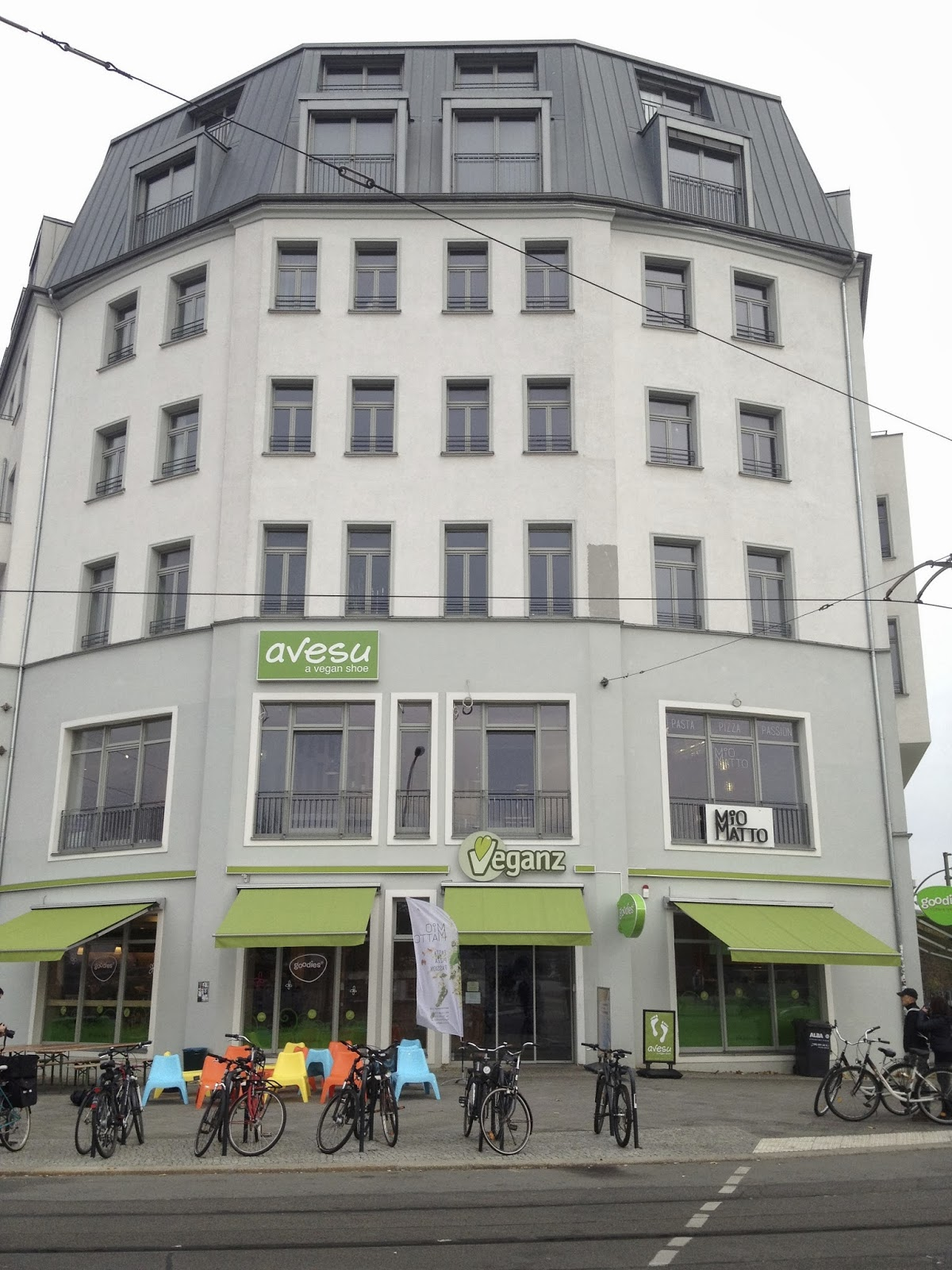
Veganz store on Warschauer Straße, Berlin, in 2013

The Veganz supermarkets sold only vegan goods, an assortment of over 4,500 products from more than 30 countries. It included plant milks and creams, vegan ice cream, vegan cheeses such as Happy Cheeze (now Dr Mannah's), mayonnaise and dressings, mock meats, fish substitutes, breads and pastries, as well as chocolate, biscuits, pet food, coffee, toiletries and cosmetics. According to the company, 85 percent of the products sold were certified organic.

The company's own brand covered sweets, meat, fish and cheese alternatives, protein products, breakfast items, and chilled and frozen food. Its cashew-based cheese alternative "The Gourmet" won a PETA Vegan Food Award in 2019. Veganz also sold a smoked-salmon alternative made from Atlantic seaweed. In 2023 it introduced Mililk, an oat drink produced in a printed, sheet-like format, which later became a core product of the Planethic group.

== Partners and availability ==
Veganz products were sold through drugstores and supermarket chains, including dm, Müller, REWE and Lidl, and were listed in several European countries as well as in Singapore and South Africa.

== Investor losses ==
Shareholders who bought at the IPO paid €87.00 per share in November 2021. By the time of the insolvency filing in June 2026, the share traded below one euro.

Holders of the 7.5% bond agreed to a restructuring in December 2024 that pushed the maturity from 2025 to 2030 and cancelled a year of interest, only for the company to default on the restructured terms fourteen months later. Whether and how much of the €10 million bond will be repaid depends on the outcome of the self-administration proceedings.

Before the IPO, private investors had also lent the company about €3.5 million through crowdfunding campaigns in 2018 and 2019. These were subordinated loans, which rank behind other creditors in an insolvency.

In its last half-year report before the filing, covering the first half of 2025, the group reported positive earnings on revenue of €2.0 million. The profit came from the book gain on the sale of its OrbiFarm subsidiary; adjusted for that one-off effect, the operating result remained negative. Nine months after the report, the holding filed for insolvency.

The proceedings reach only the holding company. Its operating brands, including Mililk, had been moved into separate subsidiaries in the year before the filing and continue trading outside the proceedings, so bond holders and other creditors hold claims against the holding alone. According to the compan y, chief executive Sascha Voigt and founder Jan Bredack, who was the largest shareholder at the time of the IPO, are financing operations during the restructuring.

== Related-party transactions ==
When the group sold OrbiFarm, its vertical-farming subsidiary, in June 2025, it described the buyer only as a third party. A finanzen.net report later named the buyers as former CEO Jan Bredack and a group of investors. Bredack became OrbiFarm's managing director in October 2025, and the subsidiary is registered at the same address as the group. The company has not named the buyer.

In September 2025 the group bought IP Innovation Partners Technology GmbH from Sascha Voigt, at the time deputy chairman of the supervisory board, for €3 million paid in 200,000 new shares. Two months later Voigt moved from the supervisory board to the position of chief executive.

The shareholder association SdK opposed parts of the December 2024 bond restructuring with counter-motions. At the general meeting in August 2025 it also objected to the election of Maja Bredack, the founder's wife, to the supervisory board, arguing that she lacked independence.

== See also ==
- List of vegetarian and vegan companies
