= Tony Fiore (disambiguation) =

Tony Fiore or Toni Fiore may refer to:

- Toni Fiore, American TV host
- Tony Fiore (ice hockey) (born 1962), ice hockey player
- Tony Fiore (born 1971), baseball player
