= Dr Mannah's =

German vegan cheese company

Coordinates: 53.864°N 8.707°E

- Formerly: Happy Cheeze (2012–2018); Happy Cashew (2018–2021)
- Founded: 2012
- Headquarters: Cuxhaven, Germany
- Number of employees: more than 25 (2021)
- Website: drmannahs.com

Dr Mannah's (previously Happy Cashew and originally Happy Cheeze) is a manufacturer of vegan cheeses in Cuxhaven, Germany. Founded by Mudar Mannah in 2012, its products are based mainly on fermented cashew nuts.

== History ==
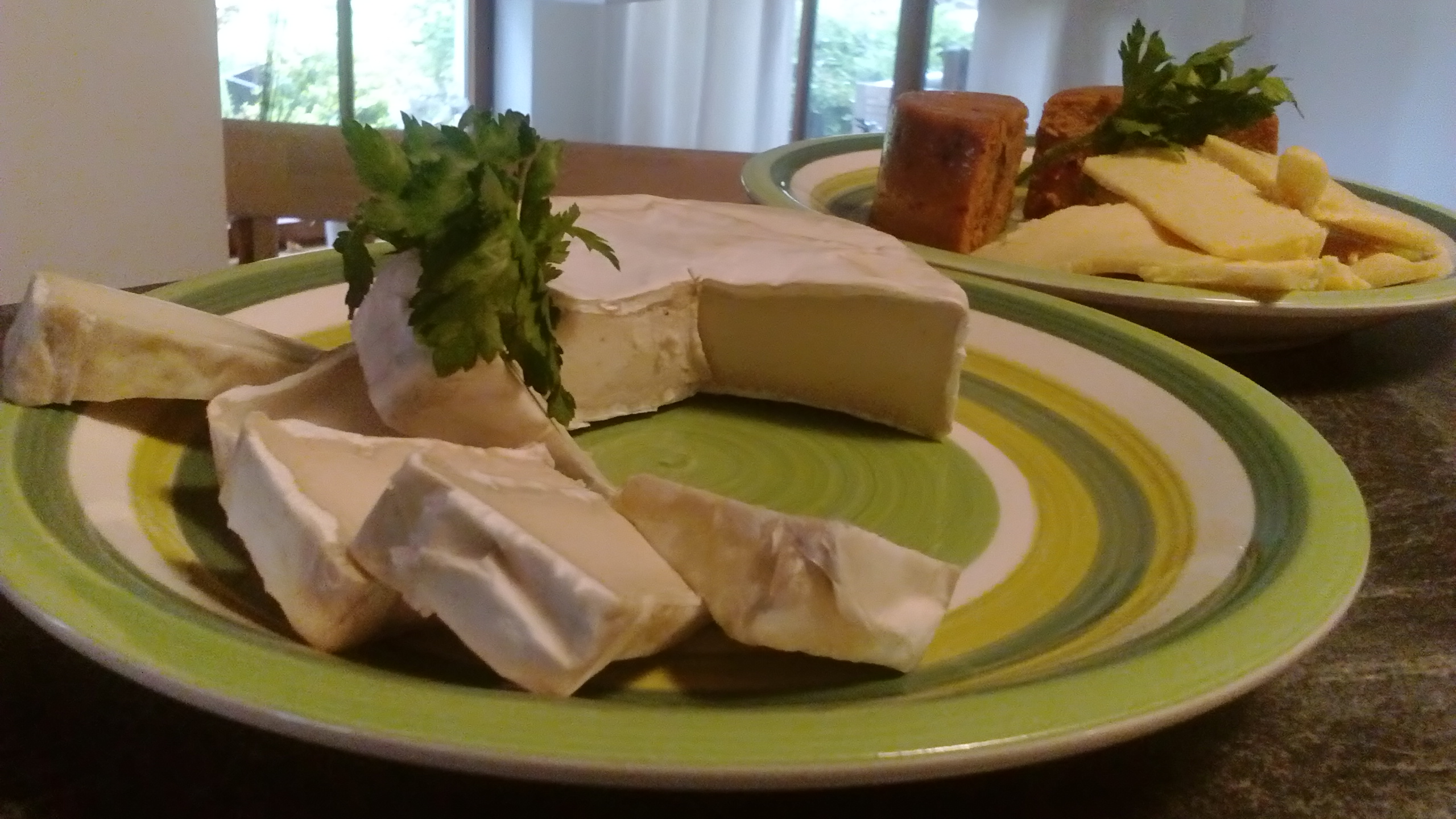
One of the company's products

The company was started in 2012 by Mudar Mannah, an orthopaedic surgeon. One of its first retail partners was Veganz with its stores in Berlin. The company, at the time called Happy Cheeze, received 200,000 euros from the European Regional Development Fund over the period from June 2016 to September 2018. The grant was for the 'acquisition of machinery and equipment for the production of vegan foods'. In 2017, the company participated in the Vox show Höhle der Löwen, a German version of Dragon's Den where it won an investment deal for 500,000 euros. The deal later fell through because the company was not ready for expansion. By 2019, the manufacturer had expanded its sales to various European areas, including London.

== Reception ==
The German illustrated Stern magazine tasted four of the company's products in 2017. The journalists declared its camembert product 'not bad at all', but preferred the cream cheese. The third of the cheeses they found 'a bit sour', while another cheese's flavour modelled on chorizo sausages 'did not fit their understanding of vegan cheese'.

== Naming controversy ==
The company was founded as Happy Cheeze. In 2018 however, Zentrale zur Bekämpfung unlauteren Wettbewerbs, an organisation representing industry associations, asked it to change its name or face a lawsuit, since EU law forbids the use of dairy terms for products without cow's milk. The vegan company then changed its name to Happy Cashew. The Zentrale then sued Happy Cashew in 2018 for supposedly misleading consumers with the label 'alternative to cream cheese'. A German court ruled in favour of the vegan company in 2019.

In 2021, the company changed its name again from Happy Cashew to Dr Mannah's, named after its founder and his medical doctor title. According to the company, the name change was motivated by an expansion of its ingredients beyond cashews.

== See also ==
- La Fauxmagerie (UK)
- Jay and Joy (France)
