= Jay and Joy =

First vegan cheese shop of France

Jay&Joy
- The company logo
- Formation: 2014
- Revenue: €780,000 in 2019
- Employees: 18 as of September 2021
- Website: jay-joy.com

Jay&Joy is the first purely vegan cheese producer of France. Most of the company's products contain Spanish almonds, while others use cashew nuts or sunflower seeds, as well as spices. Its most successful product is a camembert-like almond and cashew cheese called Joséphine.

The company makes its products in La Croix-Saint-Ouen north of Paris and sells them retail and online in several European countries. Jay and Joy also operates a cheese shop in the 11th arrondissement of Paris, called La crèmerie végétale ("The plant-based creamery"). As of 2020, more of its customers are lactose intolerant than vegan.

In 2023, all of their products were recalled after several listeriosis cases were linked to the consumption of Jay and Joy merchandise. They mostly happened among pregnant women and were suspected of having induced preterm births.

== History ==
The company was started in Paris in 2014 by Mary Iriarte Jähnke, a vegan and former fashion employee with a French-Venezuelan background, and her German partner Eric Jähnke, also a vegan and an engineer by education. Mary Jähnke took lessons from a master cheesemaker, saying the company defends the craft of cheesemaking.

Jay&Joy's first retail partner was the French organic chain Biocoop. In 2018, they started exports, beginning with the Belgian organic chain Bio-Planet (operated by the Colruyt Group). They then expanded sales to the Netherlands and Germany. As of September 2021, 20% of the company's revenue stems from exports.

They first produced in the 11th arrondissement of Paris but moved out to La Croix north of the capital in 2019, expanding the production floor from 60 to 450 square metres.

In June 2023, César Augier, together with an investment fund, announced the acquisition of Jay&Joy. In 2025, Jay&Joy, is distributed in ten european countries. In January 2025, they announced they double their production capacity with the acquisition of Les Nouveaux Affineurs and a €2M Investment

== See also ==
- La Fauxmagerie, the first vegan cheese producer of the United Kingdom
- Dr Mannah's, a German vegan cheese producer founded in 2012
