= Toni Fiore =

American TV host and chef

Toni Fiore is an American TV host, cookbook author, and chef, focusing on vegetarian and vegan dishes.

== Biography ==
Fiore was born to an Italian-American father and a German mother, and spent her teens and 20s in Italy. She is a self-taught chef and she lives in Cumberland, Maine.

== Career ==
Fiore is known for creating many vegetarian and vegan recipes, including millet beet burgers, dijon tempeh, tunno sandwiches, and eggplant meatballs.

=== Cooking shows and books ===
Fiore hosted the TV show Totally Vegetarian produced by creator Betsy Carson, Delicious TV. Filming on Totally Vegetarian began in 2002 at the cable access station in Portland, Maine before it was picked up by PBS; 52 episodes were produced. In 2008, Da Capo Lifelong Books published Totally Vegetarian: Easy, Fast, Comforting Cooking for Every Kind of Vegetarian, by Fiore.

Fiore co-hosted the PBS cooking show Vegan Mashup for three seasons (2012-2016) with Miyoko Schinner and Terry Hope Romero. Guest chefs on the show included Bryant Terry, Colleen Patrick-Goudreau, Girl Gone Raw Elizabeth Fraser, and Cathi DiCocco.

== See also ==
- List of vegan media
