= Jan Bredack =

German entrepreneur

- Born: 9 April 1972 (age 54); Salzwedel, East Germany
- Occupation: entrepreneur
- Known for: co-founder and former CEO of Veganz (later Planethic Group)

Jan Bredack (born 9 April 1972) is a German entrepreneur. He is the co-founder and was CEO of Veganz, a German wholesaler and supermarket chain for plant-based products. He founded the company in Berlin in 2011 after a management career at Daimler and led it until September 2025, from a supermarket chain described at the time as the first of its kind in Europe to a listed maker of plant-based branded goods. PETA Germany named him its first Person of the Year in 2014.

== Early life ==
Bredack was born on 9 April 1972 in Salzwedel, a small town in East Germany. In interviews he has described a difficult childhood: a father he calls abusive, who worked for the Stasi, and a mother who taught Russian. He has also said that his brother was active in far-right circles. He trained as a motor vehicle mechanic in the GDR and later passed the master craftsman's examination. After German reunification he moved west, earning extra money at first with evening repair jobs for private clients, and later studied management part time at the University of St. Gallen.

== Career ==
=== Daimler ===
Bredack joined Daimler-Benz in the early 1990s, starting as a roadside-assistance mechanic. He built up customer service structures in the German truck sales organisation and, at 30, became head of sales and service for commercial vehicles in Germany. He later served as technical director of Mercedes-Benz Trucks Vostok, a joint venture between Daimler and the Russian truck maker KAMAZ, where he oversaw the construction of the first Mercedes truck plant in Russia. He suffered a burnout in 2008 and left the company to start Veganz.

=== Veganz ===
Bredack became a vegan on 1 January 2009, after his burnout and influenced by his then wife, a vegetarian. He has said the decision began with animal welfare and that environmental reasons became more important to him over time. In 2011 he founded Veganz GmbH; the first Veganz store was established in Berlin's Prenzlauer Berg neighbourhood. The chain grew to about ten stores in Germany, Austria and elsewhere in Europe.

The retail subsidiary filed for insolvency in self-administration around the turn of 2016/17. Bredack said the stores had been losing up to €500,000 a month, partly because the company's own wholesale business, which supplied vegan products to chains such as Edeka and REWE, had made its own stores redundant. Veganz then concentrated on its own product brand, launched in 2015, and on wholesale; by 2021 its products were distributed to more than 15,000 retail outlets in Europe.

Under Bredack, Veganz Group AG went public on the Scale segment of the Frankfurt Stock Exchange in November 2021 at €87.00 per share, at the bottom of the marketed range. The roughly €33.8 million in gross proceeds were largely earmarked for a new production plant in Werder (Havel), which was abandoned in 2022 over cost overruns. The share lost most of its value in the following years, and the company remained loss-making. Bredack said in a 2024 podcast interview that becoming a millionaire at 27 had cost him his grounding.

Bredack stepped down as CEO at the end of September 2025. He became managing director of OrbiFarm GmbH, a vertical-farming company built on technology licensed from a Fraunhofer institute, which Veganz had sold in June 2025 for about €30 million. The company described the buyer only as a third party; a finanzen.net report named the buyers as Bredack and a group of investors. Bredack remained the company's largest shareholder. He was succeeded as CEO first by Rayan Tegtmeier, who was dismissed after 52 days, and then by supervisory board member Sascha Voigt.

The company, renamed Planethic Group AG in 2025, filed for insolvency under self-administration in June 2026. According to the company, Bredack and CEO Voigt are financing operations during the proceedings.

== Public reception ==
PETA Germany named Bredack its Person of the Year in 2014, the first time the award was given, for making vegan products more widely available. In the same year he was among the three national finalists of the Deutscher Gründerpreis.

Parts of the radical vegan scene rejected him as a capitalist, and Veganz stores were repeatedly vandalised. Bredack addressed this in an interview with Die Zeit titled "Ich bin der Feind" ("I am the enemy"), saying his focus on building a profitable company and working with large retail chains had made him a target.

== Personal life ==
Bredack has been married three times and has seven children. His third wife, Maja Bredack, brought two children into the marriage, which Bredack has dated to around 2014; she was elected to the supervisory board of the Planethic Group in 2025. The family household is largely vegan. According to Bredack, five of the seven children eat vegan, as does the family dog, while the cats do not.
