= Miyoko Schinner =

Japanese-American vegan activist

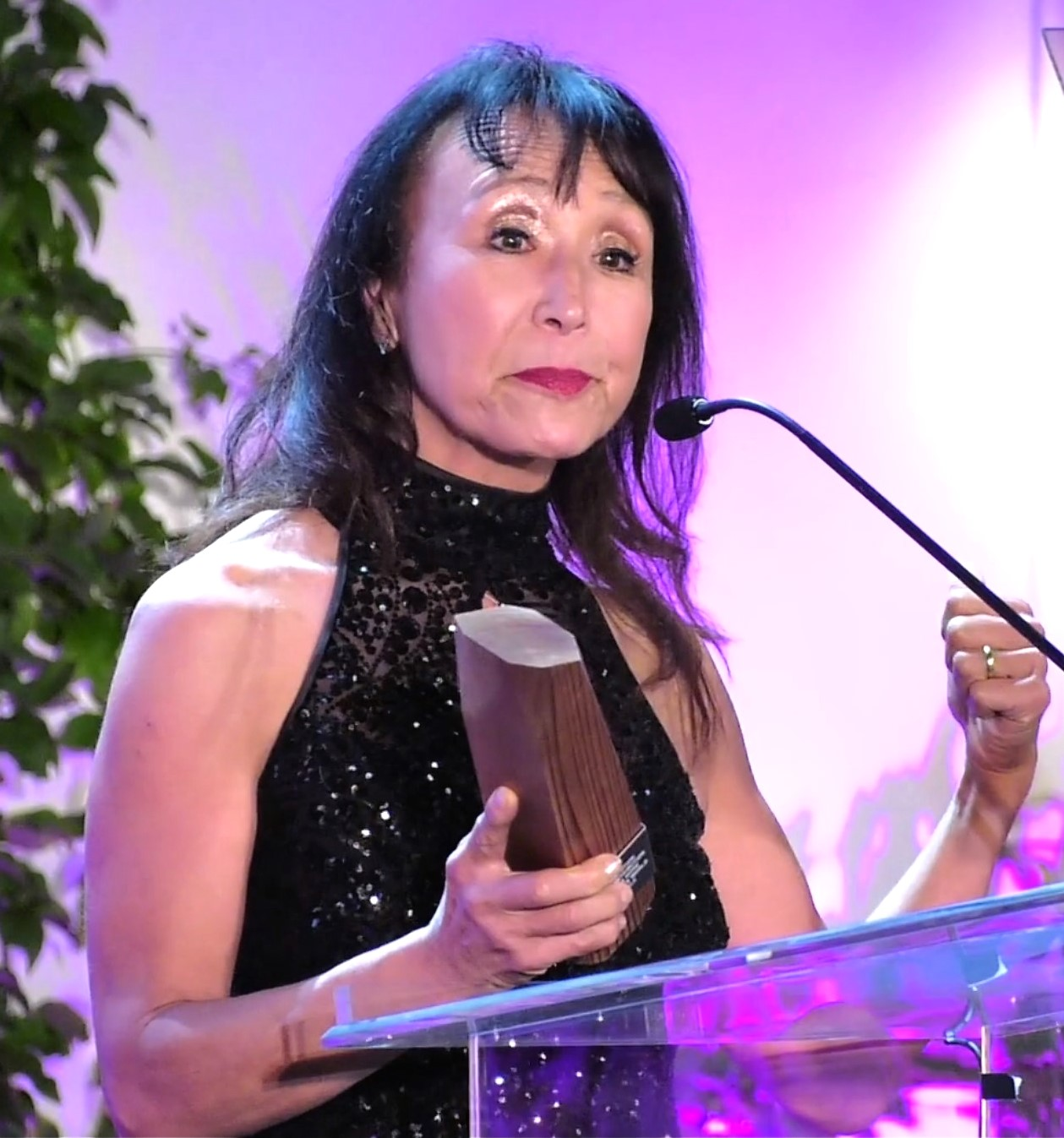
- Schinner delivering keynote address at Animal Equality Gala 2017
- Born: Miyoko Nishimoto; 1957; Japan
- Education: St. John's College (BA)
- Occupations: Vegan chef; activist; cookbook author; cooking show host; entrepreneur
- Writing career
- Subject: Veganism cookbooks
- Notable works: The New Now and Zen Epicure: Gourmet Cuisine for the Enlightened Palate (2001); Artisan Vegan Cheese (2012); The Homemade Vegan Pantry: The Art of Making Your Own Staples (2015); The Vegan Meat Cookbook: Meatless Favorites. Made with Plants (2021); The Vegan Creamery: Plant-Based Cheese, Milk, Ice Cream, and More (2025)
- Website: www.miyokoschinner.com

Miyoko Schinner (née Nishimoto; born 1957) is an American-Japanese vegan chef, cookbook author, activist, cooking show host, and social entrepreneur. Since 2024, she has been on the faculty of the University of California, Berkeley's Haas School of Business.

== Early life and education ==
Schinner was born in a town outside of Tokyo, Japan as Miyoko Nishimoto. She left Japan and moved to the United States when she was seven. Schinner and her family settled in Marin County, specifically in Mill Valley, California.

Schinner became a vegetarian at the age of 12. She describes this period as "the 60s and early 70s, the glory days of the hippie movement and spiritualism and hare krishna," or the turn to natural foods within the American counterculture. Her initial exposure to this movement occurred during a camping trip that included vegetarians who "were from a spiritual family and didn't believe in harming animals. I went home and my mother put pork chops in front of me after being vegetarian for two or three days. I looked at the pork chop and just could not eat it. I stopped right there." Schinner's mother did not support this shift towards vegetarian dishes, forcing Schinner to teach herself how to cook. However, Schinner credits this period as the time that she grew to love cooking. Although this interest in cooking led her to consider culinary school, she ultimately decided not to attend (as she would have to work with animal products), and is entirely self-taught.

Schinner began college at the Pratt Institute in order to study graphic design, but dropped out after a year. She eventually transferred to St. John's College in Annapolis, and graduated with a B.A. in philosophy in 1979.

== Madam Miyoko ==
During the 1980s, Schinner returned to Japan and settled in Tokyo. During this period she transitioned from a vegetarian to a vegan diet for "health reasons" (she realized that she was lactose intolerant). As she began to explore how to create vegan dishes for herself, she decided to sell her creations. She started a small business called "Madam Miyoko" and sold vegan poundcakes (made of Okara), out of her backpack. She still missed cheese, describing the 80s as the "dark ages of vegan cheese" still dominated by "hippies and macrobiotic food." She briefly visited the United States during this time to attend the Natural Products Expo, where she tasted "Vegan Rella," the only vegan cheese product available at the time. However, she found it disappointing and began to dream of alternatives.

== Now and Zen ==
=== Now & Zen Bistro and Bakery ===
Schinner returned to the United States and settled in San Francisco. She started a wholesale bakery out of her home, which evolved into a retail bakery, then a cafe. In 1991, she published her first cookbook, The Now and Zen Epicure: Gourmet Cuisine for the Enlightened Palate. The cafe evolved into the restaurant Now & Zen Bistro and Bakery in 1994. During the holiday season, she would make the vegan Unturkey (a seitan roast with a yuba shell), which she exhibited at the 1995 Natural Products Expo (and ended up with $50,000 worth of orders). She sold the Now & Zen Bistro and Bakery in 1997.

=== Now & Zen Inc. ===
Schinner also created a vegan natural food company called Now & Zen Inc. that focused on "The Unturkey," a dish that she first served at the Bistro. However, as more orders came in for the Unturkey as well as different products, Schinner found herself overwhelmed. She also found investors more interested in investing in tech, as it was the dot-com boom. In addition, she had "married shortly before starting the café, and three months after they opened the door she gave birth to her second child. In fact, her water broke on the restaurant floor during lunch hour. Then, the head chef quit and his replacement turned out to have a heroin problem. Her mother, who’d needed Miyoko’s care in her last few years of life, died in 2000, and within a few months her father began to fade, also requiring end-of-life care until his passing in 2002. Finally, in 2003 Miyoko called it quits."

=== Cookbooks ===
During this period, Schinner produced three vegan cookbooks. VegNews listed The New Now and Zen Epicure as one of the "Top 100 Vegan Cookbooks of All Time" in 2024.

- Nishimoto, Miyoko (1991). The Now and Zen Epicure: Gourmet Cuisine for the Enlightened Palate. The Book Publishing Company. ISBN 978-0913990780.
- Nishimoto Schinner, Miyoko (1999). Japanese Cooking: Contemporary & Traditional [Simple, Delicious, and Vegan]. The Book Publishing Company. ISBN 978-1570670725.
- Nishimoto Schinner, Miyoko (2001). The New Now and Zen Epicure: Gourmet Cuisine for the Enlightened Palate. The Book Publishing Company. ISBN 978-1570671142.

== 2012-2016 ==
=== Cookbook ===
In 2012, Schinner published Artisan Vegan Cheese, a cookbook that focused entirely on the production of vegan cheese. In 2021, Food & Wine referred to it as "the seminal cookbook that put vegan cheesemaking on the map," and VegNews listed it as one of the "Top 100 Vegan Cookbooks of All Time" in 2024.

- Schinner, Miyoko (2012). Artisan Vegan Cheese. The Book Publishing Company. ISBN 978-1570672835.

=== Cooking show ===
Schinner co-hosted the PBS cooking show Vegan Mashup for three seasons (2012–2016) with Toni Fiore and Terry Hope Romero. Guest chefs on Vegan Mashup included Bryant Terry, Colleen Patrick-Goudreau, Girl Gone Raw Elizabeth Fraser, and Cathi DiCocco.

== Miyoko's Kitchen/Miyoko's Creamery ==
Schinner initially thought her cookbook Artisan Vegan Cheese had given readers all the tools that they would need to create vegan cheese. Fans told her however, that they wanted her to make the cheese for them. Although Schinner was reluctant to start a business again, she was eventually persuaded to create a new vegan cheese company. She thus founded Miyoko's Kitchen in 2014, as an online business.

Schinner's initial goal was to create dairy-free products including butter and a wide variety of different types of cheeses using traditional cheesemaking cultures and techniques, chiefly out of cashews, oats, and chickpea flour. She launched the company with herself as CEO and four employees on a Friday, and by Monday they had 50,000 orders. In December of that year, the new company moved from a 4,000-square-foot facility to a 29,000-square-foot facility located in Petaluma. Fundraising continued to grow: in 2017, it obtained $6 million in funding, for a total of $12 million. Eventually Schinner changed the name from "Miyoko's Kitchen" to "Miyoko's Creamery."

Miyoko's Kitchen eventually accrued $1 million in seed money, first being invested in by Seth Tibbott, the founder of Tofurky. Ellen DeGeneres and Portia de Rossi made an investment in Miyoko's Creamery in November 2019. In addition to vending within the United States, Miyoko's Creamery expanded its market in 2019, distributing to Canada and Australia. Miyoko's Food Truck, in a Cross Country Tour starting from March 4, 2020, distributed 15,000 free grilled cheese sandwiches around the United States in order to promote cruelty-free vegan cheese in the Country. In August 2021, Miyoko's Creamery prevailed on First Amendment grounds in their lawsuit against the California Department of Food and Agriculture's attempts to force the company to cease using the words "Cheese" and "Butter" (among others) in the marketing of their products.

Miyoko’s Creamery removed Schinner from the company in 2022. Schinner described this decision as the result of a conflict over the “future growth” of the company. The Board said that it wanted a more traditional CEO. On February 16, 2023 Miyoko's Creamery filed a lawsuit against Schinner, alleging that she misappropriated confidential information and copied the data to her personal cloud after the board of directors voted to terminate her as CEO. The case was filed in the US District Court for the Northern District of California, Case 3:23-cv-00711. In response, on March 3, Schinner's attorney Lisa Bloom announced that she would be filing a wrongful termination counter lawsuit. Bloom stated: “The company's behavior in forcing her out of the company she created and built, then trashing her via an outrageously malicious and misleading lawsuit will be met with facts and witnesses showing that Miyoko's own complaints of toxic and sexist behavior by certain male executives were swept under the rug, and then she was demoted and fired.” On May 18, 2023, Miyoko's Creamery and Schinner released a joint announcement stating that "they have resolved all legal disputes between them and that they have withdrawn all legal claims made against each other." The announcement also stated that they both “wish each other well as they go their separate ways.”

=== Cookbooks ===
During this period, Schinner published two vegan cookbooks with Ten Speed Press. Good Housekeeping listed The Homemade Vegan Pantry as one of the best vegan cookbooks in 2019. In 2021,The Vegan Meat Cookbook: Meatless Favorites. Made with Plants was nominated for an IVFF cookbook award, and the next year The San Francisco Chronicle listed it as one of the "best new cookbooks to start 2022."

In 2024, Food & Wine named The Homemade Vegan Pantry one of "the 20 Best Vegan Cookbooks for Every Type of Meal," and VegNews listed both The Vegan Meat Cookbook and The Homemade Vegan Pantry as "Top 100 Vegan Cookbooks of All Time."

- Schinner, Miyoko (2015). The Homemade Vegan Pantry: The Art of Making Your Own Staples. Ten Speed Press. ISBN 978-1607746775. (Foreword by Isa Chandra Moskowitz).
- Schinner, Miyoko (2021). The Vegan Meat Cookbook: Meatless Favorites. Made with Plants. Ten Speed Press. ISBN 978-1984858887.

=== Documentary ===
During this period, Schinner also discussed her work with Miyoko's Kitchen/Creamery for the documentary, You Are What You Eat: A Twin Experiment (2024).

== 2023-present ==
In 2023, Schinner launched the YouTube cooking show, The Vegan Good Life with Miyoko. The following year, she joined the University of California, Berkeley's Haas School of Business as "Professional Faculty" in Business & Social Impact. She teaches courses in the Plant-Futures lab with program co-founder Brittany Sartor.

=== Cookbook ===
Schinner published The Vegan Creamery with Ten Speed Press in 2025. KCRW’s Good Food program listed it as one of "The Best Cookbooks of 2025 (according to Good Food)," and it won first place in VegNews's 2026 Veggie Awards (Best Cookbook).

- Schinner, Miyoko (2025). The Vegan Creamery: Plant-Based Cheese, Milk, Ice Cream, and More. Ten Speed Press. ISBN 978-0593836071. (Foreword by Joe Yonan).

=== Attempt to buy back Miyoko's Creamery ===
On November 5, 2025 Schinner announced that she created a bid to buy back Miyoko's Creamery (as it was up for sale). However, she said on November 10 that she was not successful, and the company will go to another bidder. A week later, Melt Organic (owned by Prosperity Organic Foods) was reported as the winning bidder. Schinner responded to the news by stating: "I am not associated in any way, and while they now own the trademark ‘Miyoko’s,’ they cannot allude to my involvement nor endorsement.” Schinner also asked the new owners for her name back and to rebrand as, "they cannot mention my name, ‘Miyoko’ or ‘Miyoko Schinner’, or imply any sort of reference that could lead people to think that I am somehow associated with it. Nor can they use my image in any way."

== Awards and honors ==
In 2018, Melaina Juntti of New Hope Network described Schinner as a "vegan rock star." Also in 2018, she was among 28 women featured in PopSugar's "28 Women Changing the World Right This Second" list, a project backed by UN Women. She is considered a pioneer in the production of vegan cheese.

In 2023, Tasting Table named Schinner as one of the “21 Plant-Based Chefs You Need To Know,” and VegNews listed her as one of the "37 Creative Chefs Crafting the Future of Vegan Food."

Year	Awards and Honors	Event
2026	First Place: Best Cookbook, The Vegan Creamery	VegNews: 2026 Veggie Awards
2022	Inc. (magazine) Female Founders 100: The Top Women Entrepreneurs of the Year	Inc. (magazine)
2021	Food & Wine Game Changers for 2021	Food & Wine
2021	Miyoko Schinner:CEO, Founder, Miyoko's Creamery	Forbes 50 over 50
2021	Person of the Year: Miyoko Schinner	Nosh Awards 2021
2019	Sofi Awards	Specialty Food Association Sofi Award, Business Leadership
2016	Vegan Hall of Fame	North American Vegetarian Society
2015	Veggie Award Product of the Year	VegNews: 2015 Veggie Awards

== Personal life ==
Miyoko and Michael Schinner have three children, a son (a basketball player in Japan) and two daughters. They divorced in 2023.

== See also ==
- List of social entrepreneurs
- List of vegan and plant-based media
