= Purezza =

British food company

- Founded: 2015; 11 years ago Brighton, UK
- Founders: Tim Barclay, Stefania Evangelisti and Filippo Rosato
- Website: purezza.co.uk

Purezza is a vegan pizzeria operating in Brighton, London and Manchester. It is Europe's first all-vegan pizzeria, opening its first branch in Brighton, UK, in November 2015.

== History ==
Purezza, meaning 'Purity' in Italian, was founded by Tim Barclay and Stefania Evangelisti, who were inspired by the lack of vegan Italian options. Their second restaurant was announced in November 2017, and opened in Camden in March 2018. Purezza tripled the sized of its Camden branch in February 2020. A Manchester branch opened in June 2021.

In August 2019, Purezza was mistakenly caught up in a drugs bust at Gatwick Airport, when ingredients for its food were seized by police.

The company received an initial £35,000 investment to open its vegan cheese factory in July 2018 at an investment pitching event in London, with a view to raising additional capital through Crowdcube. Purezza has stated that the cheese will be free from major allergens and palm oil. The company is no longer producing vegan cheese outside of their own restaurants.

== Ownership and Rebranding ==
In November 2023, plant-based pizzeria chain Purezza acquired a majority stake in La Fauxmagerie.

In April 2025, artisan vegan cheese company Honestly Tasty acquired the La Fauxmagerie brand from Purezza. Following the acquisition:

- The brand retained its original name, La Fauxmagerie, under its new parent company.
- The original website domain (lafauxmagerie.com) was retained by Purezza and rebranded as Saporia, an online multi-brand plant-based marketplace.
- La Fauxmagerie migrated its primary online retail storefront to lafauxmagerie.co.uk.

== Food ==
Purezza specialises in vegan pizza, but also provides a range of vegan alternatives to other Italian dishes such as lasagne, macaroni cheese, and tiramisu. They are also known for a range of raw food dishes, including raw cheeses and a raw pizza. In addition to its plant-based menu, Purezza also has an extensive gluten free menu, for which it has won a Silver Award from the Free From Eating Out Awards. During Christmas 2023, the restaurant in Brighton was reported to have been serving a vegan Christmas dinner menu with Christmas calzones and turkey dinners.

== Awards ==
Purezza took part in the National Pizza Awards 2018, National Pizza of the Year 2018 in the UK with the Parmigiana Party pizza.

They also won UK's Best Vegan Restaurant 2018 according to Vegfest UK.

Purezza's head chef, Filippo Rosato, won Best Pizza from Abroad 2018 in the #pizzAward 2018 competition held in Naples.

The team also won an award at the World Pizza Championship for the Pizza Classica category. The winning pizza was titled "The Promised Land" and used cavolo nero, tempeh, pioppini mushrooms, and a borlotti bean sauce. The dough was infused with BrewDog Punk IPA.
