= Lisa Bloom =

American lawyer (born 1961)

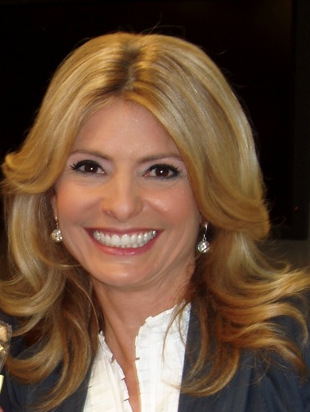
- Bloom in 2009
- Born: Lisa Read Bray; September 20, 1961 (age 65); Philadelphia, Pennsylvania, U.S.
- Education: University of California, Los Angeles (BA); Yale University (JD)
- Occupations: Attorney; author; television legal analyst
- Employer: The Bloom Firm
- Children: 2
- Mother: Gloria Allred
- Website: www.lisabloom.com

Lisa Read Bloom (née Bray; born September 20, 1961) is an American civil rights attorney known for representing high-profile clients in cases involving sexual harassment, discrimination, and abuse. Bloom has represented clients like Janice Dickinson against Bill Cosby, Mischa Barton in a revenge porn case, multiple women whose sexual harassment claims resulted in the firing of Bill O'Reilly from Fox News, and Blac Chyna against Rob Kardashian. She gained attention for briefly advising Harvey Weinstein in 2017, a decision she later apologized for, citing it as a mistake. Bloom also represented women accusing Donald Trump of sexual misconduct during the 2016 election.

Bloom founded and owns the Bloom Firm, a general-practice law firm handling family, civil, and criminal matters in California and New York firm that has represented clients including Kathy Griffin and Mischa Barton. Bloom was also the anchor of Lisa Bloom: Open Court (formerly Bloom and Politan: Open Court), a two-hour live legal news program on truTV's In Session, from 2006 to 2009.

Bloom is the only child of civil rights attorney Gloria Allred and Peyton Huddleston Bray Jr.

== Early life and education ==
Bloom was born Lisa Read Bray, the daughter of Gloria Bloom (later Allred) and father Peyton Huddleston Bray Jr. Her mother is Jewish. Her parents' marriage was short-lived—they had married and divorced while in college. Peyton Bray, who suffered from bipolar disorder, later killed himself, and Bloom subsequently took her mother's maiden name. When Bloom was seven, her mother married William C. Allred.

Bloom received a bachelor's degree from UCLA, where she graduated Phi Beta Kappa and was National College Debate Champion. She received her J.D. degree from Yale Law School in 1986.

== Career ==
=== Early career ===
After graduating from law school, Bloom began her career in New York and by 1991 worked at her mother's law firm, Allred, Maroko & Goldberg, assisting in unsuccessfully suing the Boy Scouts of America for sex discrimination on behalf of Katrina Yeaw, a girl who wanted to join the organization. While at her mother’s firm, Bloom also filed a child sexual abuse suit against the Roman Catholic Church and sued the LAPD.

=== Later career ===
In 2001, Bloom left her mother's firm, having developed a career in cable news punditry, eventually serving as a legal analyst on CBS News, CNN, HLN, and MSNBC, and appearing on The Early Show, The Insider, Dr. Phil, Dr. Drew, The Situation Room, Reliable Sources, The Joy Behar Show, Issues with Jane Velez-Mitchell, and The Stephanie Miller Show. Bloom returned to practicing law in 2010 when she founded the Bloom Firm, a small, general-practice law firm that handles family, civil and criminal matters. She is licensed to practice law in both New York and California.

At the Bloom Firm, Bloom has represented several notable clients, including model and actress Janice Dickinson in her defamation case against comedian Bill Cosby, as well as model and actress Mischa Barton in her revenge porn case. Model Blac Chyna later hired Bloom to obtain a temporary restraining order against socialite Rob Kardashian, with whom Chyna shares a daughter, Dream. Amid a series of sexual abuse allegations against powerful men in entertainment and media, and following a BuzzFeed report detailing a sexual harassment settlement paid out of Representative John Conyers’ office budget, Bloom represented Marion Brown, who spoke to BuzzFeed off the record and later came forward publicly to allege harassment by Conyers.

==== Bill O'Reilly sexual harassment allegations ====
In 2017 Bloom represented three women accusing then-Fox News anchor Bill O’Reilly of sexual harassment. Jehmu Greene, a television commentator who had appeared on Fox News, also approached Bloom with sexual harassment allegations against O'Reilly, although she ultimately declined Bloom's services. One of Bloom's clients, Wendy Walsh, filed the complaint that led Fox News' parent company, 21st Century Fox, to initiate an investigation that resulted in O'Reilly's dismissal and the end of his eponymous program.

==== Donald Trump sexual misconduct allegations ====
During the 2016 U.S. presidential election, Bloom offered to represent four women who alleged sexual misconduct by then-presidential candidate Donald Trump. Two of these women came forward publicly with their allegations, including Jill Harth and Lisa Boyne.

On November 2, 2016, Bloom canceled a press conference with the unnamed client, saying the client was scared because of death threats. According to Bloom, after this press conference, multiple donors contacted her with offers to cover accusers' relocation and security. Bloom felt an obligation to relay the offers to her clients. The Virginia woman said that donors had offered her as much as $750,000, but that she declined the offer. In a 2017 report, The New York Times identified the donors who contacted Bloom as David Brock's American Bridge 21st Century, which offered $200,000, and Susie Tompkins Buell, who offered $500,000.

==== Harvey Weinstein and Roy Price sexual misconduct allegations ====
Bloom received significant media attention after film producer Harvey Weinstein was accused of sexual misconduct in October 2017. While noting that Weinstein "denies many of the accusations as patently false," Bloom acknowledged advising Weinstein on power dynamics and harassment, calling him "an old dinosaur learning new ways." Bloom's advisory role, which she assumed in late 2016, was pilloried for its dissonance with her prior representation of sexual assault victims, with some in the media calling her book adaptation deal with The Weinstein Company, signed during Weinstein's tenure as co-chairman, a conflict of interest.

On October 7, 2017, two days after the initial article on sexual misconduct in The New York Times, Bloom stepped down from her advisory role amid mounting public criticism and friction with The Weinstein Company's board. According to emails obtained by The New York Times, Bloom had weighed responding to allegations against Weinstein with "photos of several of the accusers in very friendly poses with Harvey after his alleged misconduct." Bloom denied plotting to undermine the accusers. The Daily Beast later reported that Bloom had offered journalist Ronan Farrow opposition research on one of Weinstein's accusers, Rose McGowan, during his own reporting on Weinstein. In Farrow's 2019 book, he further claims that Bloom would report any information gleaned about his investigation back to Weinstein, and that she admitted to being "his people". A 2019 book by reporters Jodi Kantor and Megan Twohey contains a 2016 memo from Bloom, as well as 2017 billing statements for services rendered on Weinstein's behalf. These documents show how Bloom would proactively assist Weinstein in undermining his accusers.

Shortly after resigning from Weinstein's team, Bloom fell victim to "email prankster" James Linton masquerading as Weinstein. In reply to the prankster, Bloom wrote that "[t]he new round of far more serious allegations were [sic] not made known to me". Variety later reported that Bloom "was only aware of accusations of verbal remarks, behaviors, and temper tantrums" when she began advising Weinstein, and was unaware of more serious allegations of rape and sexual assault. Within weeks of the initial report in The New York Times, Bloom publicly apologized for her role advising Weinstein.

Bloom also represented former Amazon Studios president Roy Price amid sexual harassment allegations, but said her representation of Price concluded before Price's accuser Isa Hackett "went public". The Daily Beast reported that Bloom, while representing Price, had attempted to disparage Kim Masters, The Hollywood Reporter's Editor-at-Large, to media outlets considering publishing Masters' report on the allegations against Price. Bloom had allegedly accused Masters of a conflict of interest for badgering Price to advertise on her KCRW show, a charge Masters denied.

==== Kathy Griffin controversy and fallout ====
Following a controversial 2017 photo shoot in which comedienne Kathy Griffin clenched a severed and bloodied mask that resembled the face of President Donald Trump, Bloom held a joint press conference with Griffin, then her client, to address the controversy. Their appearance was widely panned in the media for its self-victimization and lack of focus.

Amid fallout over Bloom's role advising Harvey Weinstein, Griffin posted a Facebook video denouncing Bloom and her husband, Braden Pollock, for "exacerbat[ing] my personal situation". Griffin later publicly asked Bloom to stop calling her and denounced Bloom for "fame-whoring," a criticism of Bloom's proposal for a joint media tour following their joint press conference. According to Griffin, Bloom also charged exorbitant legal fees, which Griffin estimated were $40,000 for two days' representation, including by defense attorney Dmitry Gorin, whom Bloom allegedly hired without Griffin's consent. In response to Griffin's comments, Bloom claimed she "had no idea there was a problem" and released a statement criticizing Griffin for speaking extemporaneously at their press conference. Bloom nevertheless wished Griffin well.

Following Griffin's own comments on Bloom, Tamara Holder, a former Bloom client, and Jehmu Greene, who had considered hiring Bloom, came forward with their own criticisms. Holder had retained Bloom after accusing Fox News Latino Vice President Francisco Cortes of sexual assault. According to Holder, Bloom proposed an initial retainer agreement granting herself 40% of any settlement, as well as a $10,000 retainer fee and reimbursement for any relevant hotel and travel expenses. Although Holder ultimately negotiated a more favorable contract, she criticized Bloom for charging thousands of dollars in extraneous fees, as well as pushing Holder to accept a gag order in her settlement with Fox News. For her part, Greene called Bloom "deceptive" for presenting her with a contract for media representation after a meeting focused primarily on legal services. Bloom responded to both allegations by claiming that "the vast majority of [the Bloom Firm's] clients are delighted with our work".

==== Martin Chitwood case ====
In October 2014, Carol Swanson Chitwood (n/k/a Carol Swanson Smith) retained Lisa Bloom and the Bloom Firm to pursue domestic violence claims against her then-husband, Martin Chitwood, a prominent Atlanta attorney, who had sued her for divorce in Atlanta two months earlier. While the divorce was still pending, Bloom filed suit against Martin Chitwood in California asserting domestic violence claims on Carol Chitwood's behalf. Martin Chitwood denied the allegations, claiming they were a tactic to prevent the enforcement of the parties' prenuptial agreement and force a settlement.

Martin Chitwood refused to settle, and on August 31, 2017, after a five-week civil trial, a twelve-person jury found him not liable for the claim Bloom brought against him. Bloom did not appeal.

=== Other ===
Bloom and her firm represented male model Jason Boyce in his lawsuit against fashion photographer Bruce Weber among other people in New York State Supreme Court in December 2017.

On May 1, 2020, Bloom posted on Twitter that although she believed Tara Reade was assaulted by the former vice president Joe Biden, she would still support Biden.

On March 3, 2023, Bloom announced that she would be representing vegan activist Miyoko Schinner in a wrongful termination counter lawsuit against Miyoko's Creamery.

On August 15, 2024, the Department of Justice announced that Lisa Bloom and Braden Pollock, senior managers at The Bloom Firm, agreed to pay $274,000 to settle allegations under the False Claims Act. The settlement resolves claims that the firm falsely certified the use of Paycheck Protection Program (PPP) loan funds for eligible payroll expenses, while actually using the funds to pay ineligible employees. The Bloom Firm will pay $204,200.34, with Bloom and Pollock each paying $35,384.49.

== Personal life ==
Bloom married Braden Pollock, on December 5, 2014. Pollock is the founder of Legal Brand Marketing and works as the Bloom Firm's manager. He was formerly on the board of the web services company Epik. Bloom and Pollock divorced in 2023.

Bloom has two adult children, daughter Sarah and son Samuel, with her former husband Jim Wong, an LAUSD teacher.

A vegetarian since 16, Bloom has been vegan since 2009. Bloom is Jewish.

== Books ==
Bloom has written three books, including Think: Straight Talk for Women to Stay Smart in a Dumbed-Down World, from 2011, and Swagger: 10 Urgent Rules for Raising Boys in an Era of Failing Schools, Mass Joblessness, and Thug Culture, from 2012. In early 2017, The Weinstein Company and Jay-Z announced plans to adapt Bloom's 2014 book, Suspicion Nation: The Inside Story of the Trayvon Martin Injustice and Why We Continue to Repeat It, into a six-part documentary series. The status of the project was unknown as of 2017, and the company subsequently filed for bankruptcy in 2018.
