= Miyoko's Creamery =

American food company

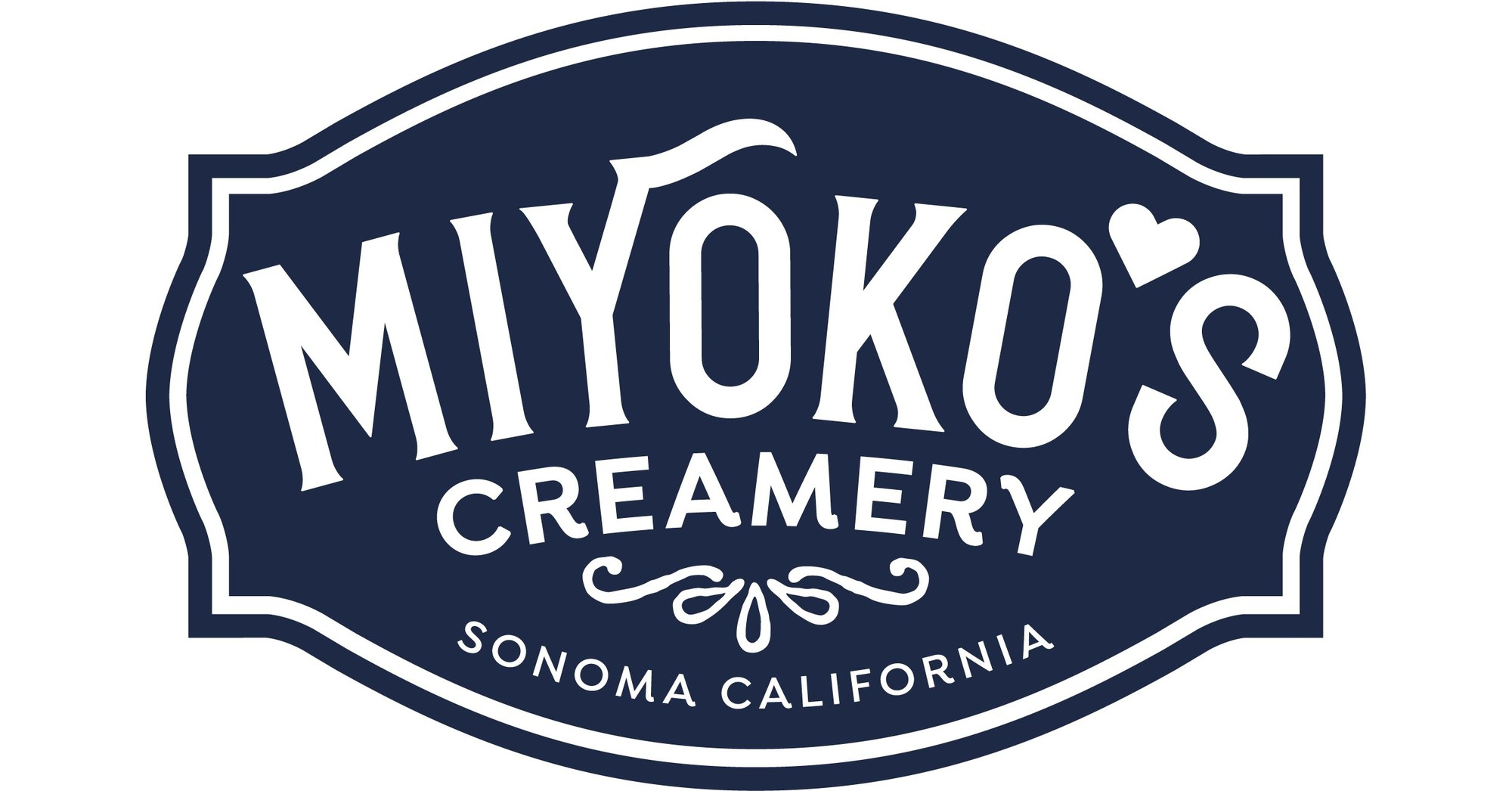
- Industry: Dairy-free products
- Founded: 2014
- Headquarters: Sonoma, California
- Website: miyokos.com

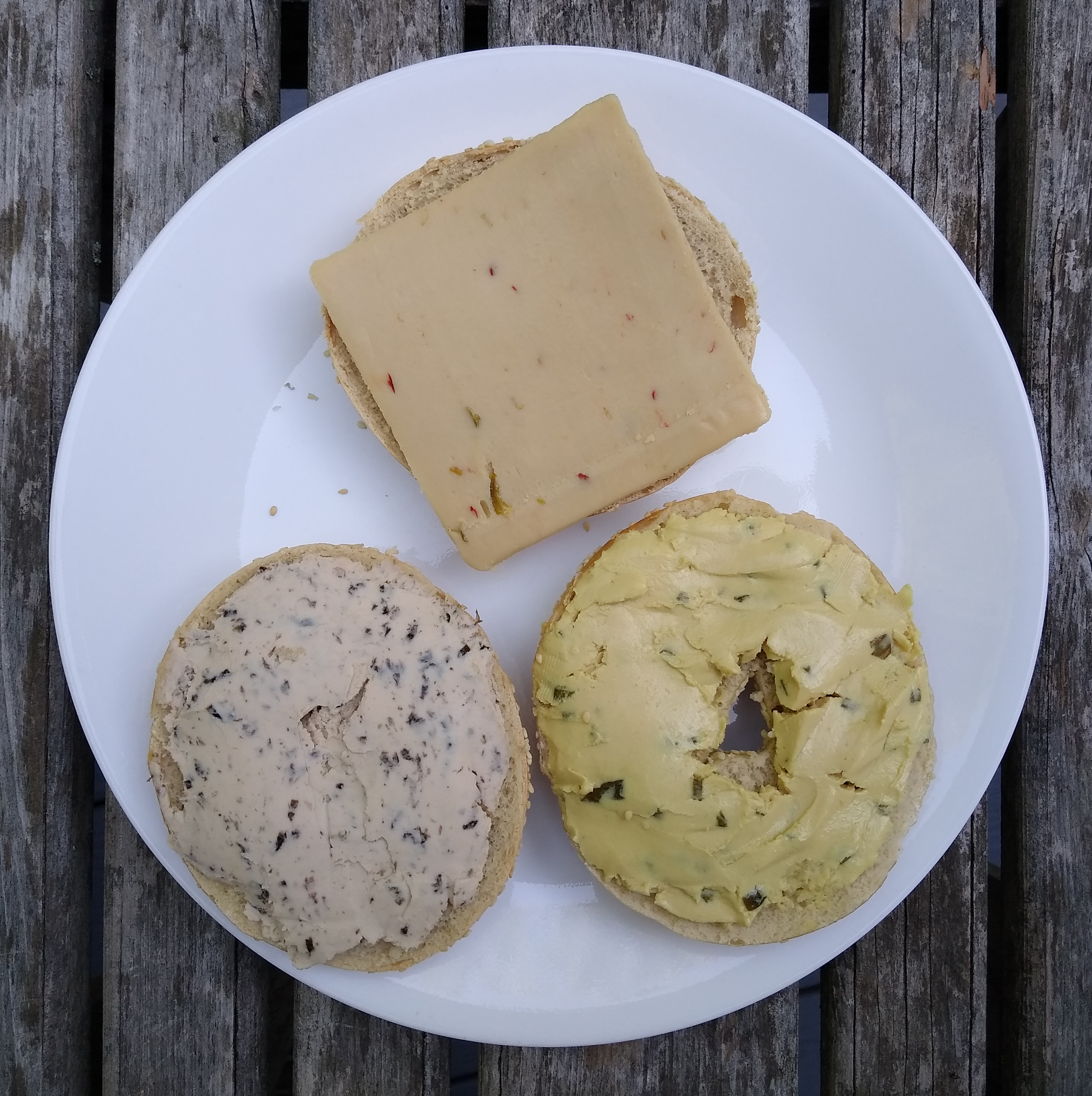
Clockwise from top: pepper jack, garlic and chive cheese spread, and lox cream cheese (all vegan).

Miyoko's Creamery, formerly Miyoko's Kitchen, is an American food producer.

== Overview ==
Miyoko's Creamery specializes in dairy-free products including butter and a wide variety of different types of cheeses using traditional cheesemaking cultures and techniques, chiefly out of cashews, oats and chickpea flour.

== History ==
=== 2014-2021 ===
In 2014, Miyoko Schinner established "Miyoko's Kitchen" as the CEO. The brand later changed its name to "Miyoko's Creamery". The startup swiftly accrued $1 million in seed money, first being invested in by Seth Tibbott, the founder of Tofurky.

Fundraising continued to grow: in 2017, it obtained $6 million in funding, for a total of $12 million. In December of that year, it moved from a 4,000-square-foot facility to a 29,000-square-foot facility, located in Petaluma. Ellen DeGeneres and Portia de Rossi made an investment in Miyoko's Creamery in November 2019. In addition to vending within the United States, Miyoko's Creamery expanded its market in 2019, distributing to Canada and Australia.

Miyoko's Food Truck, in a Cross Country Tour starting from March 4, 2020, distributed 15,000 free grilled cheese sandwiches around the United States in order to promote cruelty-free vegan cheese in the Country.

In August 2021, Miyoko's Creamery prevailed on First Amendment grounds in their lawsuit against the California Department of Food and Agriculture's attempts to force the company to cease using the words "Cheese" and "Butter" among others in the marketing of their products.

=== 2022-2023 ===
Miyoko’s Creamery removed Schinner from the company in 2022. Schinner described this decision as the result of a conflict over the “future growth” of the company. The Board said that it wanted a more traditional CEO. On February 16, 2023, Miyoko's Creamery filed a lawsuit against Schinner, alleging that she misappropriated confidential information and copied the data to her personal cloud after the board of directors voted to terminate her as CEO. The case was filed in the U.S. District Court for the Northern District of California, Case 3:23-cv-00711. In response, on March 3, Schinner's attorney Lisa Bloom announced that she would be filing a wrongful termination counter lawsuit. Bloom stated: “The company's behavior in forcing her out of the company she created and built, then trashing her via an outrageously malicious and misleading lawsuit will be met with facts and witnesses showing that Miyoko's own complaints of toxic and sexist behavior by certain male executives were swept under the rug, and then she was demoted and fired.” On May 18 Miyoko's Creamery and Schinner made a joint announcement that both lawsuits were resolved. The announcement states: "Miyoko’s Creamery and Miyoko Schinner are pleased that they have resolved all legal disputes between them and that they have withdrawn all legal claims made against each other. Miyoko’s Creamery acknowledges the tremendous creativity, hard work, and integrity of its founder, Miyoko Schinner, a true pioneer in vegan creamery products, and appreciates her many contributions to the company over the years. Miyoko Schinner appreciates the dedicated team of people at Miyoko’s Creamery and their commitment to continuing her legacy through sustained and continued excellence in manufacturing, developing and selling vegan creamery products." It also states that they both “wish each other well as they go their separate ways.”

In November 2023 Miyoko’s Creamery announced plans to raise $12 million in funding and explore the potential sale of the business, as reported by Bloomberg. In a letter to shareholders, CEO Stuart Kronauge outlined a "financial stabilisation plan" aimed at increasing profits and considering strategic alternatives, including selling the company.

=== 2025 ===
On November 5, 2025 Schinner announced that she created a bid to buy back Miyoko's Creamery (as it was up for sale). However, she said on November 10 that she was not successful, and the company would go to another bidder. A week later, Melt Organic (owned by Prosperity Organic Foods) was reported as the winning bidder. Schinner responded to the news by stating: "I am not associated in any way, and while they now own the trademark ‘Miyoko’s,’ they cannot allude to my involvement nor endorsement.” Schinner also asked the new owners for her name back and to rebrand as, "they cannot mention my name, ‘Miyoko’ or ‘Miyoko Schinner’, or imply any sort of reference that could lead people to think that I am somehow associated with it. Nor can they use my image in any way."
