= Colleen Patrick-Goudreau =

American author, cultural commentator, and podcaster (born 1970)

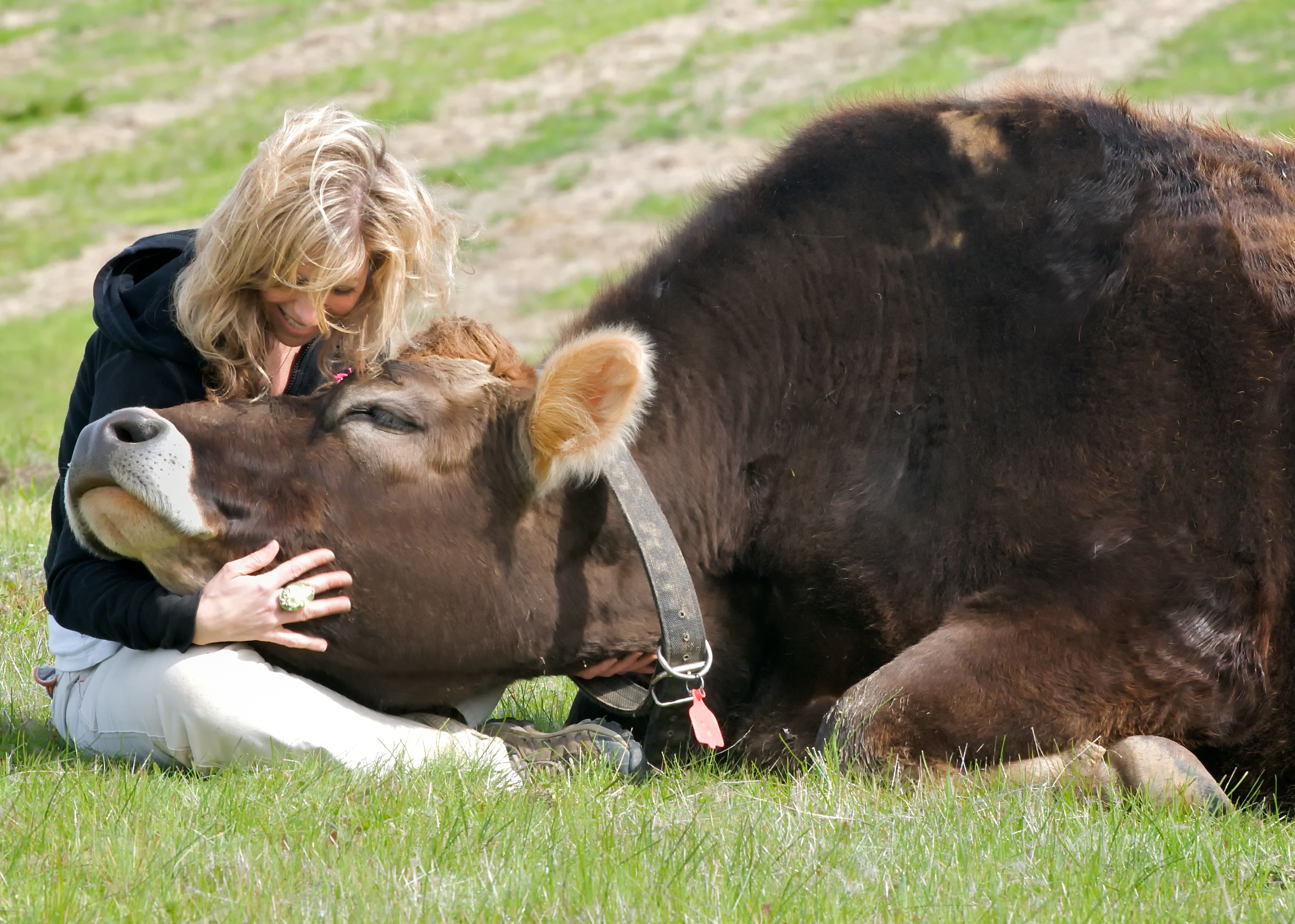
- Colleen Patrick-Goudreau with rescued dairy steer at Farm Sanctuary
- Born: March 8, 1970 (age 56); Westfield, New Jersey
- Occupations: American author, speaker, and podcaster

Colleen Patrick-Goudreau (born March 8, 1970, in Westfield, New Jersey) is an American author, lecturer, TEDx speaker, cultural commentator, and podcaster. Patrick-Goudreau advocates veganism as a means by which to prevent cruelty to animals.

== Work ==
Patrick-Goudreau has written several books, including her first, The Joy of Vegan Baking in 2007 (which was re-issued for the 10-year-anniversary edition in 2017), followed by The Vegan Table: 200 Unforgettable Recipes for Entertaining about which Library Journal wrote, "Her sophisticated but mostly uncomplicated recipes will appeal to nonvegans and vegans alike." Her book Color Me Vegan is organized by color to highlight the phytochemicals in plant foods. Her book The 30-Day Vegan Challenge includes recipes and a "crash course in veganism," according to Bust. The book also addresses the health benefits of being a vegan. The 30-Day Vegan Challenge helps dispel the myth that veganism is about "deprivation and limitations," according to the Oregonian.

Her most recent book, The Joyful Vegan: How to Stay Vegan in a World That Wants You to Eat, Meat, Dairy and Eggs," was published by BenBella Books in 2020.

In 2005, Patrick-Goudreau founded the podcast Food for Thought which has been voted "Favorite Podcast" by readers of VegNews for several consecutive years. She has another podcast called ANIMALOGY, which examines the animal-related words and expressions we use and what they say about the relationship between human and non-human animals, which is also the topic of her 2020 TEDx talk. Patrick-Goudreau is also a contributor to NPR. She was featured on Vegan Mashup, a show produced for PBS. Patrick-Goudreau has appeared on national and regional TV programs, including CBS with Good Day Sacramento, and FOX where she has shared her knowledge and recipes.

Patrick-Goudreau lives in Oakland, California with her husband David and two cats, Charlie and Michiko.

== Bibliography ==
- Patrick-Goudreau, Colleen (2017). The Joy of Vegan Baking: Revised and Updated Edition: More than 150 Traditional Treats and Sinful Sweets. Fair Winds Press. ISBN 978-1592332809.
- Patrick-Goudreau, Colleen (2009). The Vegan Table: 200 Unforgettable Recipes for Entertaining Every Guest at Every Occasion
- Color Me Vegan: Maximize Your Nutrient Intake and Optimize Your Health By Eating Antioxidant-Rich, Fiber-packed, Color-intense Meals That Taste Great. Fair Winds Press. 2010. ISBN 978-1592334391.
- Vegan's Daily Companion: 365 Days of Inspiration for Cooking, Eating, and Living Compassionately. Quarry Books. 2011. ISBN 978-1-59253-679-5.
- The 30-Day Vegan Challenge. Roundtree Press. 2017. ISBN 978-1944903145.
- Patrick-Goudreau, Colleen (2020) The Joyful Vegan: How to Stay Vegan in a World That Wants You to Eat Meat, Dairy, and Eggs. BenBella Books. 2020. ISBN 978-1948836463
- Patrick-Goudreau, Colleen (2013). On Being Vegan: Reflections on a Compassionate Life

== See also ==
- Women and animal advocacy
- List of animal rights advocates
