= Vegan cheese =

Cheese-like food item made without animal ingredients

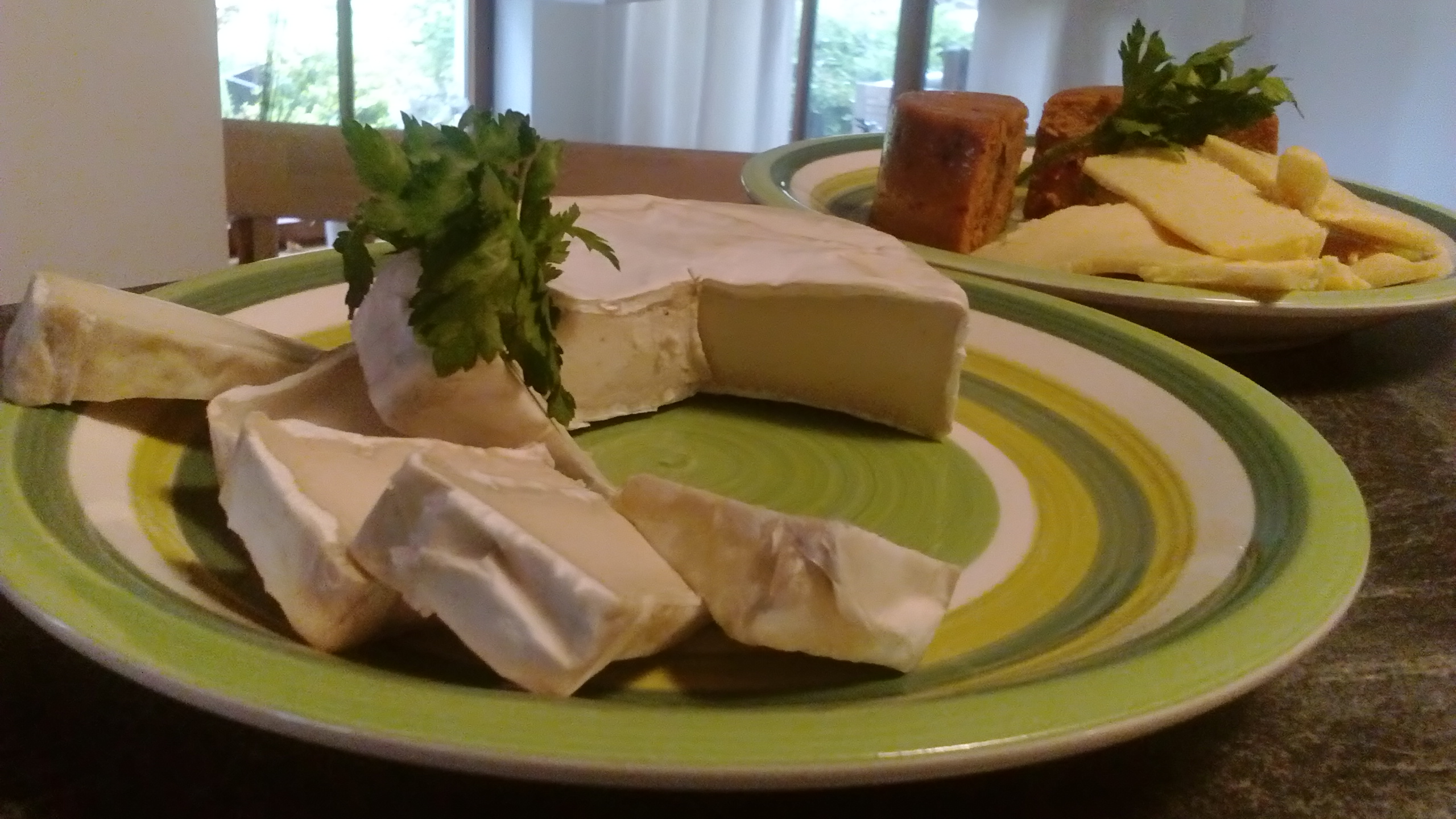
- Vegan cheese made from cashews and almonds
- Main ingredients: Cashew, almond, sesame, sunflower, pine nut, peanuts, soybeans, coconut oil, nutritional yeast, tapioca, rice or potatoes

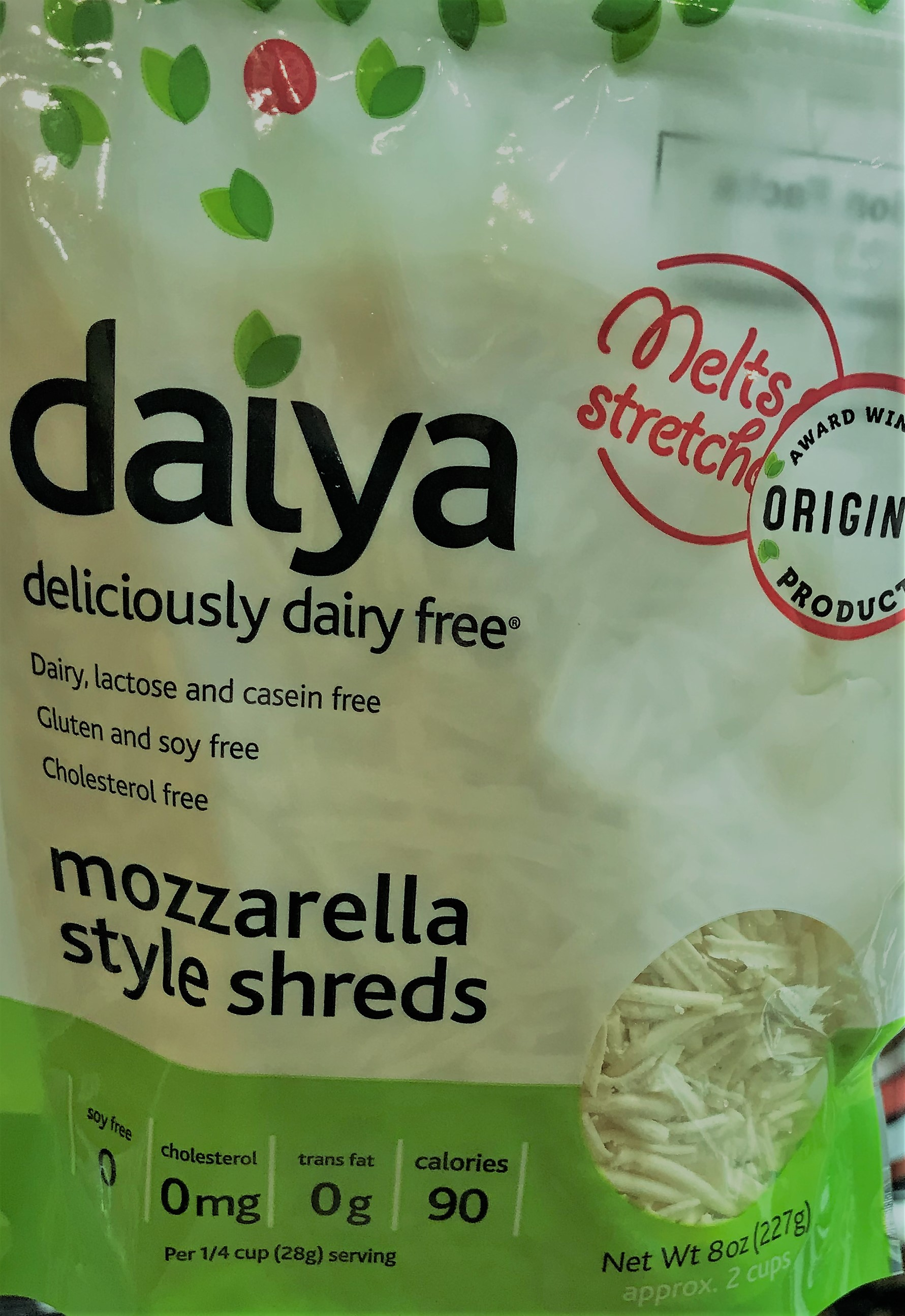
Store-bought vegan shredded cheese

Vegan cheese is a category of non-dairy, plant-based cheese alternative. Vegan cheeses range from soft fresh cheeses to aged and cultured hard grateable cheeses like plant-based Parmesan. The defining characteristic of vegan cheese is the exclusion of all animal products.

Vegan cheese can be made with components derived from vegetables, such as proteins, fats and plant milks. It also can be made from seeds, such as sesame, sunflower, nuts (cashew, pine nut, peanuts, almond) and soybeans; other ingredients are coconut oil, nutritional yeast, tapioca, rice, potatoes and spices.

== History ==
Fermented bean curd (furu) has been documented in China since the late 16th century. The savory product is used as a condiment to accompany rice or porridge. Western sources from the 19th to 21st centuries repeatedly draw a comparison between furu and cheese, going as far as calling it a "nondairy/vegan cheese".

Later homemade vegan cheeses were made from soy flour, margarine, and yeast extract. With harder margarine, this can produce a hard vegan cheese that can be sliced; softer margarine produces a softer, spreadable cheese.

The product became commercially available from around the 1970s or 1980s. These initial products were lower in quality than dairy cheese or today's vegan cheese, with a waxy, chalky or plastic-like texture.

In the early 1990s, the only brand of vegan cheese available in the United States was Soymage. Since then, the number and types (e.g., mozzarella, cheddar, etc.) of widely available vegan cheeses have diversified. Also, soy-free options have since been explored. In the 1990s, vegan cheese sometimes cost twice as much as dairy cheese.

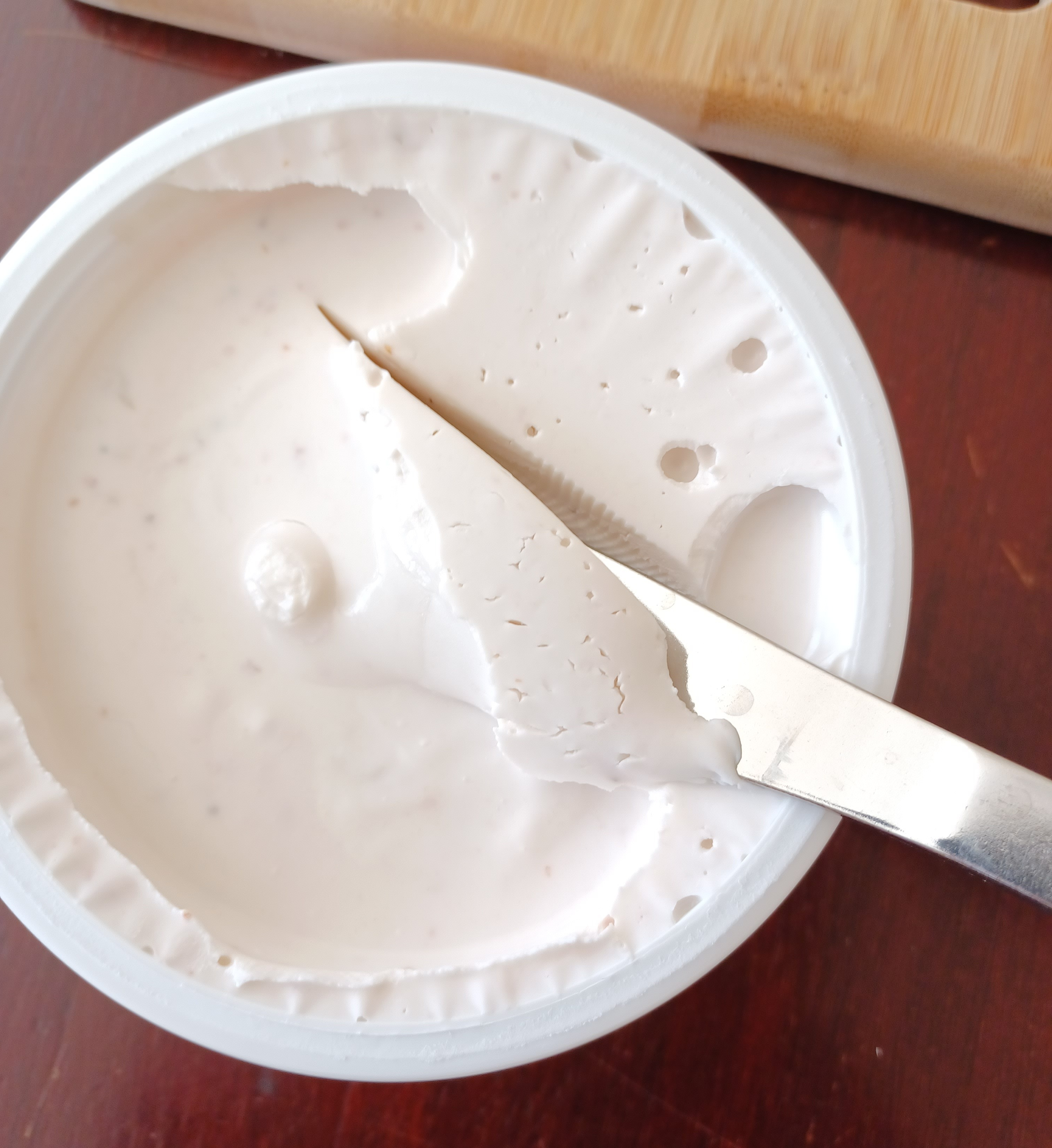
Strawberry-flavored vegan cream cheese, made with whey protein produced by microbes

From 2018 to 2020, several new companies were founded to make animal-free cheese, including New Culture, Change Foods, Legendairy Foods, and Better Dairy. Some use genetically engineered yeast to synthesize cow milk proteins without the use of cows. In February 2025, France based vegetal cheese maker, Jay&Joy, present in ten European countries, announced they were to double their production capacity with the acquisition of Les Nouveaux Affineurs and a €2M Investment.

== Market ==
From 2018, the market for vegan cheese grew on a global scale. According to market research, Europe had the greatest market share of 43%, followed by North America, Asia-Pacific, South America, the Middle East, and Africa. The global vegan cheese market is expected to attain a market value of $3.9 billion by the end of 2024, up from $2.1 billion in 2016.

According to the Plant Based Food Association, the US market for plant-based foods is anticipated to reach $4 billion in sales by 2024. The expansion is driven by the increased inclination towards vegetarian sources, rising urban populations, and greater preference towards international foods. Multiple grocery chains expanded their geographical presence within specialty stores and supermarkets to address the anticipated growth for vegan cheeses, with annual sales growth expected at 8%.

The more common types of vegan cheese being manufactured, distributed, and produced through this market are mozzarella, Parmesan, cheddar, Gouda, and cream cheese non-dairy based cheeses. These vegan cheeses are consumed in restaurants, grocery stores, bakeries, vegan school meals, and in homes. Vegan cheeses are expected to grow and diversify into the mid-2020s.

As of 2017, vegan cheese is generally more expensive than dairy cheese for consumers.

== Regulation ==
=== Labeling ===
Labelling of vegan cheese, like other vegan dairy analogues, is controversial, with dairy industry groups pushing to prohibit the use of terms like "cheese" on non-dairy products. Labelling purely plant-based products as "cheese" is prohibited in the European Union and the United Kingdom.

In February 2019, a Vancouver, British Columbia, vegan cheese shop was ordered by the Canadian Food Inspection Agency (CFIA) to stop calling their products cheese as it was 'misleading' to consumers, despite the store stating that their cheese was always labeled as "dairy-free" and "plant-based". The CFIA later reversed the rejection and stated there was no objection for using the nomenclature "100% dairy-free plant-based cheese" provided that "it is truthful".

European Union regulations state that terms applicable to dairy products, including "cheese", can be used to market only products derived from animal milk. In June 2017 the Court of Justice of the European Union issued a judgement in relation to a German vegan food producer TofuTown, clarifying that purely plant-based products could not be labelled and sold as "plant cheese" or "veggie cheese" (Judgement in case C-422/16).

In the United Kingdom, strict standards are applied to food labelling for terms such as "milk", "cheese" and "cream", which are protected to describe dairy products and may not be used to describe non-dairy produce. In 2019, a Brixton, UK, vegan cheese shop was asked by Dairy UK to stop describing products as cheese because it 'misleads shoppers', although the store owners stated their "products were clearly marked as dairy-free."

In 2020, vegan cheese company Miyoko's Creamery filed a lawsuit against the California Department of Food and Agriculture after the department ordered the company to stop using dairy words on its packaging. In 2018, the company was sued in New York in a lawsuit that alleged customers were misled by the label "vegan butter". Company founder Miyoko Schinner is a leading advocate for free speech rights relating to vegan foods.

=== Bans ===
Production and sale of vegan cheese has been banned in Turkey since 2022.

== Ingredients and production ==
Common plant-based proteins or vegetable proteins used in vegan cheeses are derived from edible sources of protein, such as soybeans, almond, and their milk. Food scientists use a "blend of gums, protein, solids, and fats" to create the mouthfeel and melt of dairy cheese since the ones made with nuts do not melt due to the solid base on which they are composed. As of 2024, several startups have developed vegan cheese products which aim to solve this difficulty by making cheese with precision-fermented casein produced by yeast rather than by cows, with one company receiving GRAS designation from the U.S. Food and Drug Administration.

Different methods are used to create texture and taste. Some vegan cheeses are not cultured or aged. Instead, acidic ingredients, such as lemon juice, are used to achieve a similar taste to dairy cheese. Ingredients of hard or firm vegan cheeses include natural agents such as agar, carrageenan, tapioca flour, and xanthan gum.

Fermentation is often used in the production of plant-based cheese to replicate texture and flavor of dairy cheese. Unlike dairy cheese, however, this is a different process, since the proteins in plant-based milk react differently to culturing agents and do not coagulate as traditional cheese does, requiring other culturing methods as well as careful ambient temperature and humidity monitoring. Common fermentation agents, include rejuvelac, non-dairy yogurt and kefir grains, although their use is sometimes discouraged due to the potential safety concerns if not managed properly. When hygienic practices and controlled fermentation conditions are not maintained, the product can carry pathogens, such as Salmonella, Listeria, E. coli, and others.

== Aged cheeses ==
Aged cheeses undergo a long fermentation process that develops their distinctive flavors. They include soft‑ripened, blue‑veined, and pressed cheeses. These products are emblematic of traditional French artisanal expertise and represent generations of cultural know‑how.

In addition to conventional cheese, innovative alternatives such as French artisanal vegan brand Jay&Joy apply traditional ripening techniques to plant‑based ingredients such as almond and cashew milk, creating aged cheese‑style products that reflect French fermentation traditions.

The primary ingredients of vegan cheeses are starches and fats, differing from dairy-based cheeses, in which proteins and fats are the primary ingredients. In dairy-based cheeses, the proteins form a continuous microstructure that extends through the cheese, but this structure in vegan cheeses is typically made of starch. This difference in the microstructure contributes to texture differences between the two foods.

== Texture ==
As an alternative to dairy-based cheeses, one of the key goals of vegan cheese producers is to reproduce the texture of dairy-based cheeses. This goal proves challenging because the ingredients in milk and vegan cheeses are different, meaning these foods respond differently to preparation techniques, like changes in temperature or being cut. To measure and compare the differences in texture, food scientists use several standard experiments.

=== Meltability ===
One empirical method designed to quantify cheese meltability, the degree to which cheese melts and flows, is the Schreiber Meltability test. In this test, a cheese cylinder of known dimensions is centered on a baking surface marked with concentric circles. Then, the cheese is heated for 5 minutes at 232 °C. After cooling, the dimensions of the cheese are re-measured, and the meltability is calculated based on the change in area and the largest distance between the center and edge of the cheese. Though this test is empirical, it is used by cheese producers and food scientists because it is a simple yet effective quantitative method to compare the meltability of vegan cheese compared to dairy cheese.

A simple rheological test for meltability is measuring how the viscosity of the cheese changes upon heating, with vegan cheese generally having lower viscosity at room temperature.

=== Hardness, springiness, and cohesiveness ===
Many other properties of cheeses can be quantified and compared using a simple uniaxial compression test, in which a cheese sample is vertically compressed and the stress and strain responses are recorded. The "hardness" of cheeses, or the force needed to bite down on the cheese, is the maximum force applied to the sample. The "springiness" of the cheese, or how well the cheese returns to its original shape after compression, is quantified using the strain recovery or dimensional change after removing the applied compressive force. Springiness is relevant to shape recovery after slicing a piece of cheese from a block. The "cohesiveness" of cheese quantifies its tendency to crumble or stay together and is determined by the strength of the chemical bonds in the cheese.

== Nutrition ==
The nutritional value of vegan cheese varies.

Most vegan cheese contains no cholesterol and less saturated fat than dairy cheese. Most vegan cheese is low in calcium, though the Go Veggie brand has similar calcium content to dairy cheese. Vegan cheese is generally not a good source of protein compared to dairy cheese.

A 1998 study comparing cheddar cheese to one type of vegan cheese found that the vegan cheese had lower calories, fat, and protein, though protein content of dairy cheese varies by type. The vegan cheese had higher riboflavin and vitamin B_{12}, making it an acceptable replacement for cheddar cheese in terms of those nutrients. On the other hand, the vegan cheese did not provide vitamin A or vitamin D, in contrast to cheddar cheese. The vegan cheese was found to be a useful source of calcium, but not as good a source as cheddar cheese.

Some vegan cheeses may be fortified to provide vitamin B_{12}, while other vegan cheeses are not.

== Gallery ==
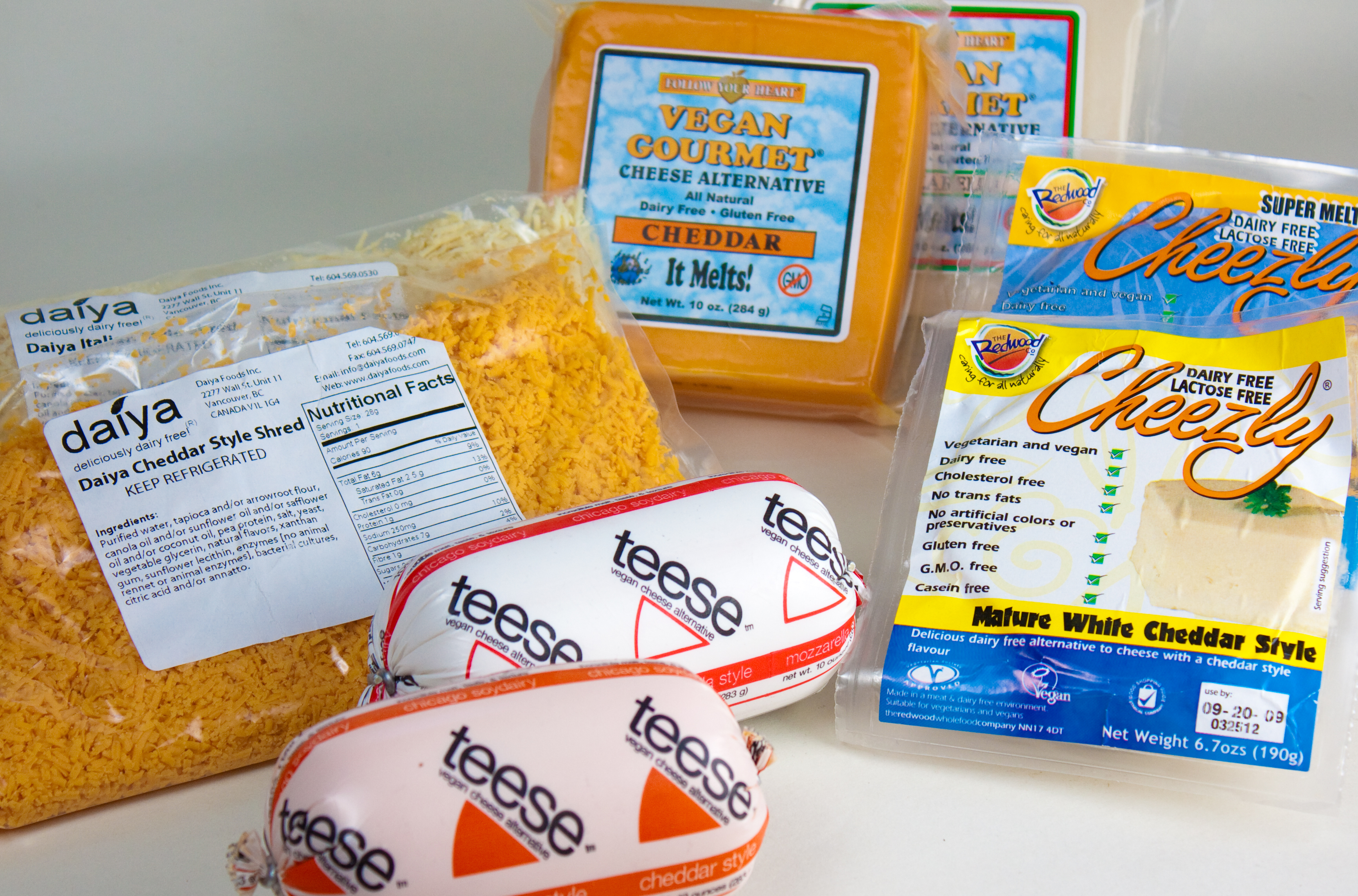
Assorted vegan cheeses

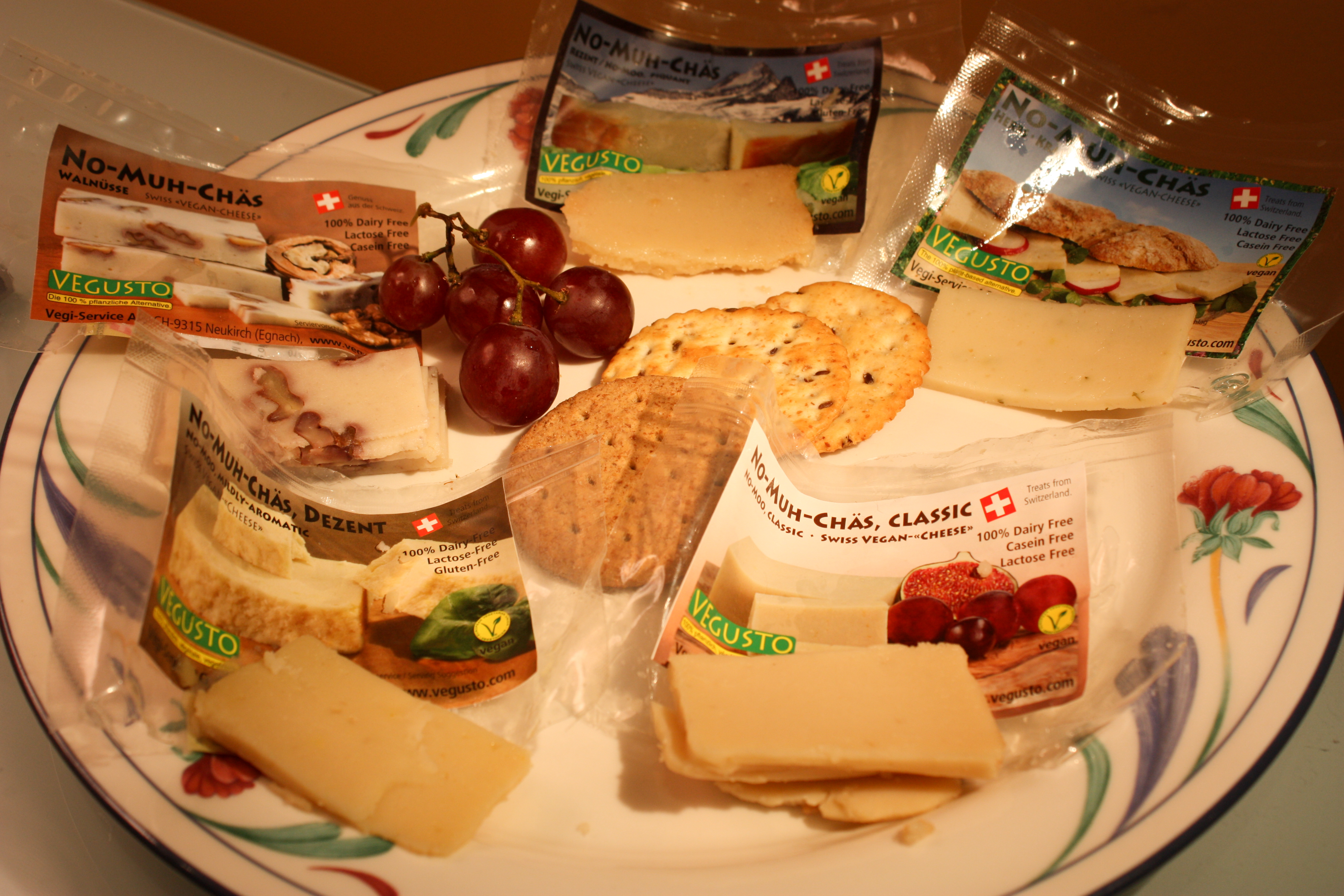
A vegan cheese platter

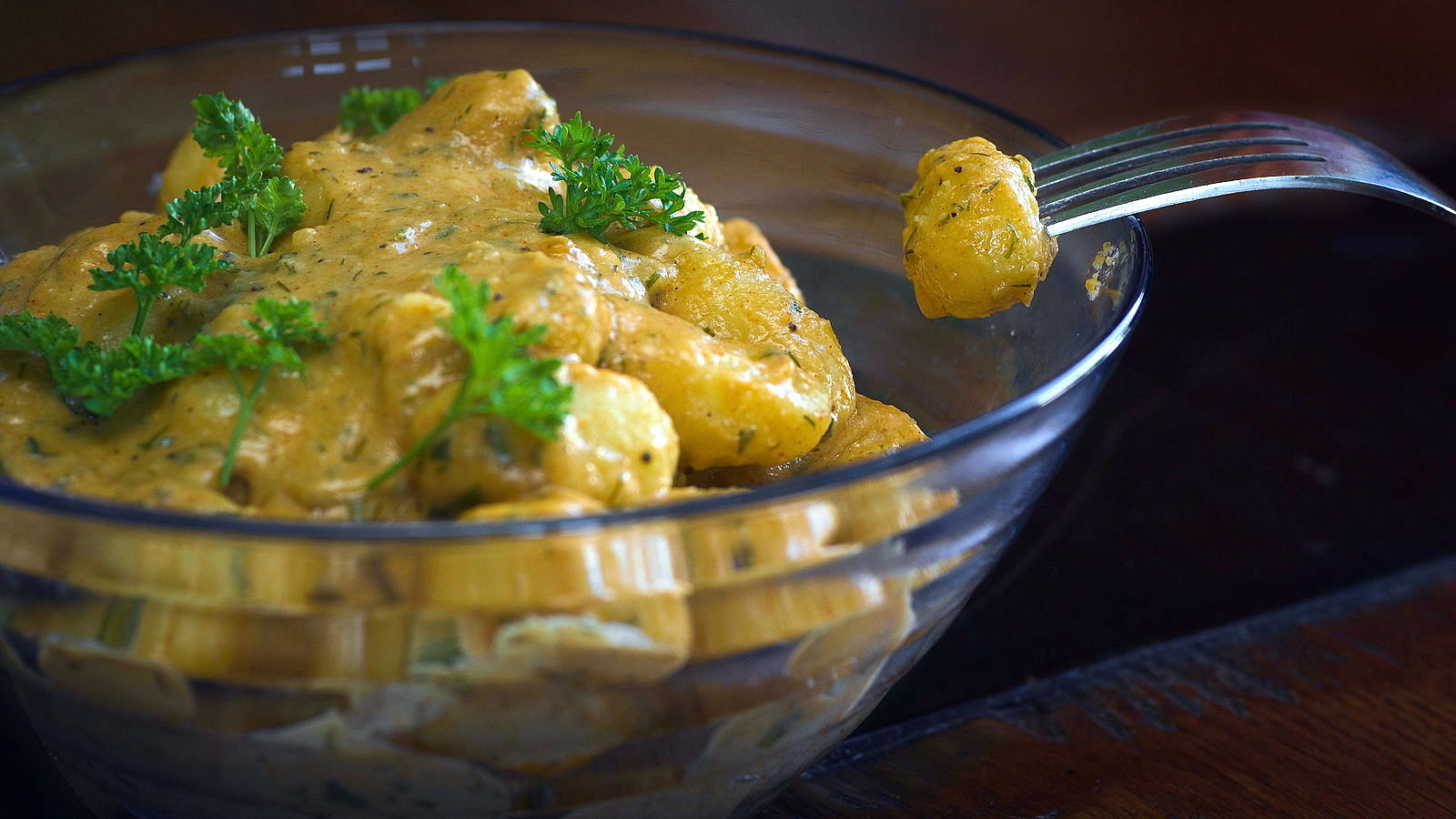
Gnocchi made with vegan cheese

== See also ==
- Miyoko Schinner
- Plant milk
- Nutritional yeast
