= Ralph Nader bibliography =

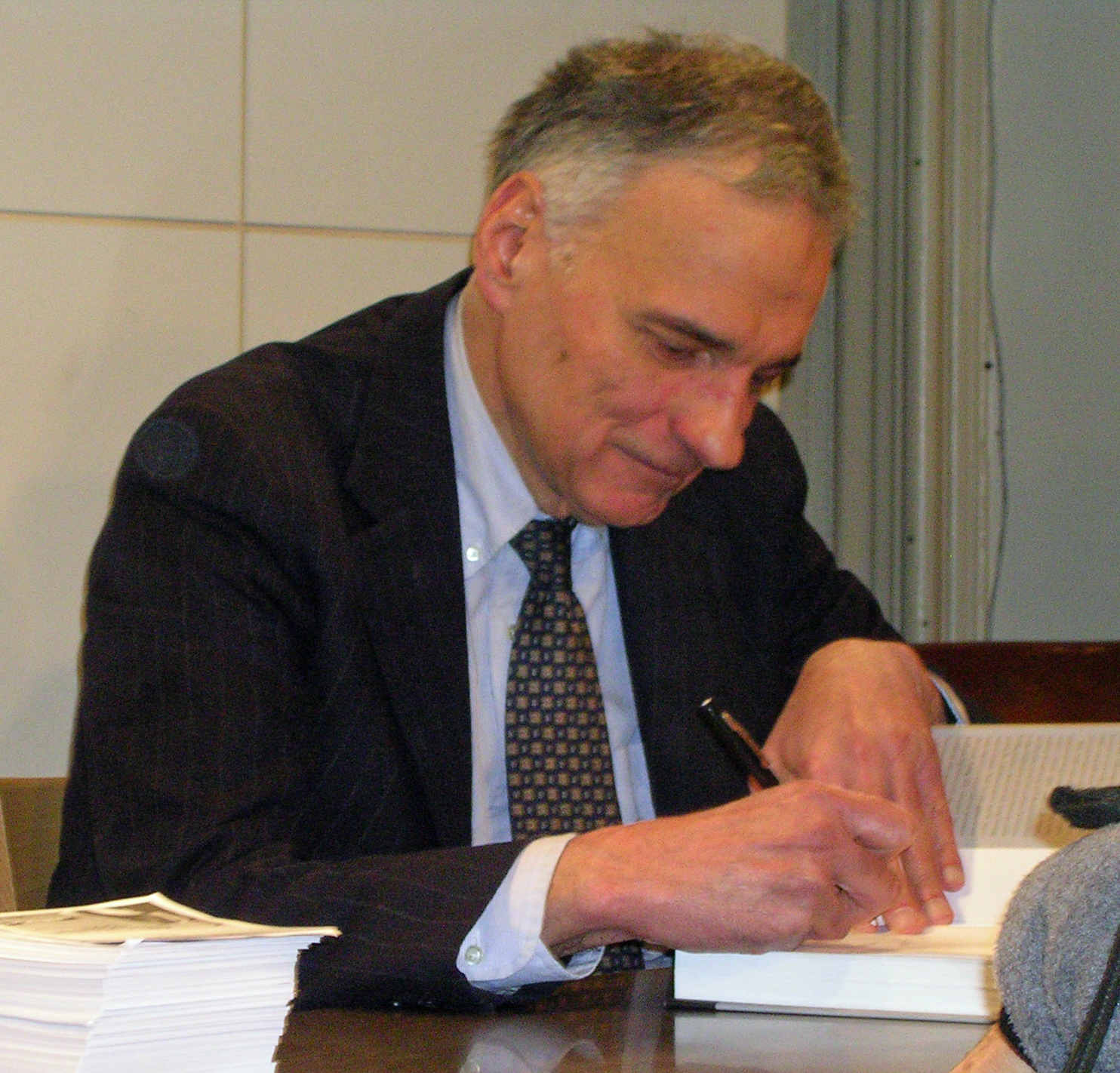
Nader at a book signing

Ralph Nader has authored, co-authored and edited many books, which include:

== Books ==
- Unsafe at Any Speed. Grossman Publishers, 1965.
- What to Do with Your Bad Car: An Action Manual for Lemon Owners (with Lowell Dodge and Ralf Hotchkiss). Grossman Publishers, 1971.
- Beware. Law-Arts, Publishers, Inc., 1971.
- Action for a Change (with Donald Ross, Brett English, and Joseph Highland). Grossman Publishers; Rev. ed., 1972.
- Whistle-Blowing (with Peter J. Petkas and Kate Blackwell). Bantam Books, 1972.
- Ralph Nader Congress Project. Grossman Publishers, 1972.
- You and Your Pension (with Kate Blackwell). Grossman Publishers, 1973.
- The Consumer and Corporate Accountability (with Jean Carper). Harcourt Brace Jovanovich, Inc., 1973.
- Corporate Power in America (with Mark J. Green). Grossman Publishers, 1973.
- Taming the Giant Corporation (with Joel Seligman, and Mark J. Green). W. W. Norton & Co., Inc., 1976.
- Verdicts on Lawyers (with Mark J. Green). Thomas Y. Crowell Co., 1976.
- The Menace of Atomic Energy (with John Abbots). W. W. Norton & Co., Inc., 1977.
- Who's Poisoning America: Corporate Polluters and Their Victims in the Chemical Age (with Ronald Brownstein and John Richard). Sierra Club Books, 1981.
- Ralph Nader Presents: A Citizen's Guide to Lobbying (with Marc Caplan). Dembner Books, 1983.
- The Big Boys: Power and Position in American Business (with William Taylor). Pantheon Books, 1986.
- Poletown: Community Betrayed by Jeanie Wylie. University of Illinois Press, 1989. Foreword by Ralph Nader.
- Winning the Insurance Game: The Complete Consumer's Guide to Saving Money (with Wesley J. Smith). Knightsbridge Publishing, 1990.
- Lemon Book: Auto Rights (with Clarence Ditlow). 3rd ed. Asphodel Pr., 1990.
- It Happened in the Kitchen: Recipes for Food and Thought (with Rose B. Nader and Nathra Nader). Center for Study of Responsive Law, 1991.
- Canada Firsts (with Nadia Milleron and Duff Conacher). McClelland & Stewart, 1992.
- The Frugal Shopper (with Wesley J. Smith). Center for Study of Responsive Law, 1992.
- Crusading Doctor: My Fight for Cooperative Medicine by Michael A. Shadid. University of Oklahoma Press, 1992. Foreword by Ralph Nader.
- Collision Course: The Truth About Airline Safety (with Wesley J. Smith). 1st ed. McGraw-Hill Co., 1993.
- Why Women Pay More by Frances Cerra Whittelsley and Marcia Carroll. Center for Study of Responsive Law, 1993. Introduction by Ralph Nader.
- The Case Against "Free Trade": GATT, NAFTA, and the Globalization of Corporate Power. Earth Island Press, 1993.
- Getting the Best from Your Doctor (with Wesley J. Smith). Center for Study of Responsive Law, 1994.
- Children First! A Parent's Guide to Fighting Corporate Predators (with Linda Coco). Corporate Accountability Research Group, 1996.
- No Contest: Corporate Lawyers and the Perversion of Justice in America (with Wesley J. Smith). Random House, 1996.
- Cutting Corporate Welfare. Seven Stories Press, 2000.
- The Ralph Nader Reader. Seven Stories Press, 2000. ISBN 1-58322-057-7
- Crashing the Party: Taking on the Corporate Government in an Age of Surrender. Thomas Dunne Books, 2002. ISBN 0-312-28433-0
- Civic Arousal. Regan Books, 2004. ISBN 0-06-079325-2
- In Pursuit of Justice. Seven Stories Press, 2004.
- The Good Fight: Declare Your Independence and Close the Democracy Gap. Regan Books, 2004. ISBN 0-06-077955-1
- The Seventeen Traditions. Harper Collins, 2007. ISBN 0-06-123827-9
- Citizen Power: A Mandate for Change by Mike Gravel. AuthorHouse, 2008. Foreword by Ralph Nader.
- Only the Super-Rich Can Save Us! Seven Stories Press, 2009. ISBN 1-58322-903-5
- Getting Steamed to Overcome Corporatism. Common Courage Press, 2011.
- The Seventeen Solutions: Bold Ideas for Our American Future. HarperCollins, 2012.
- Told You So: The Big Book of Weekly Columns. Seven Stories Press, 2013. ISBN 978-1-60980-474-9
- Unstoppable: The Emerging Left–Right Alliance to Dismantle the Corporate State. Nation Books, 2014. ISBN 1568584547
- Return to Sender: Unanswered Letters to the President, 2001–2015. Seven Stories Press, 2015. ISBN 9781609806262.
- Breaking Through Power: It's Easier Than We Think. City Lights Books, 2016. ISBN 9780872867055
- Animal Envy: A Fable. Seven Stories Press, 2016. ISBN 9781609807528
- How the Rats Re-formed the Congress. Center for Study of Responsive Law, 2018. ISBN 9780936758084
- To the Ramparts: How Bush and Obama Paved the Way for the Trump Presidency, and Why It Isn’t Too Late to Reverse Course. Seven Stories Press, 2018. ISBN 9781609808471
- The Ralph Nader and Family Cookbook: Classic Recipes from Lebanon and Beyond. Akashic Books, 2020.
- First Class: The U.S. Postal Service, Democracy, and the Corporate Threat by Christopher W. Shaw. City Lights Books, 2021. Foreword by Ralph Nader. ISBN 9780872868779
- The Rebellious CEO: Twelve Leaders Who Did It Right. Melville House, 2023. ISBN 9781685891077
- Civic Self-Respect. Seven Stories Press, 2025. ISBN 9781644212783

== Articles ==
- The "I" Word - Boston Globe - May 31, 2005 - Nader calls for the impeachment of President George W. Bush (with Kevin Zeese)
- Letter to Senate Judiciary Committee on Alito Nomination — Jan. 10, 2006
- Bush to Israel: 'Take your time destroying Lebanon' — The Arab American News — Aug. 2006
- Bill Moyers For President Nader on Bill Moyers running for President in 2008, October 28, 2006

== Selected speeches and interviews ==
- Radio interview of Ralph Nader about the Consumer Financial Protection Bureau and corporate tax loopholes on Democracy Now!
- Ralph Nader Speech at the Covair Society of America
