= Nader =

- Pronunciation: Arabic: [ˈnæːdeɾ, ˈnaːdɪɾ]
- Gender: Male
- Language: Arabic

Origin
- Meaning: rare
- Region of origin: Western Asia

Other names
- Alternative spelling: Nadir

Nader is a masculine given name and surname of Arabic origin (نادر Nādir, meaning "rare", "unique"). The name Nadir is a variant. Nader or Näder is also a German surname, meaning embroiderer or tailor.

Notable people with the name include:

== Given name ==
- Nader Shah (1698–1747), former Shah of Iran (Persia)
- Nader Ahmadi (born 1986), Iranian football player
- Nader Bagherzadeh (born 1955), American professor of computer engineering
- Nader Batmanghelidj (1904–1998), Iranian army general
- Nader al-Dahabi (born 1946), Jordanian politician
- Nader Darehshori (born 1936), businessman in the United States
- Nader Engheta (born 1955), Iranian scientist and engineer
- Nader Fergany (1944–2024), Egyptian sociologist and economist
- Wael Nader al-Halqi (born 1964), Syrian politician
- Nader Jahanbani (1928–1979), Iranian army officer
- Nader Matar (born 1992), Lebanese footballer
- Nader El-Sayed (born 1972), Egyptian footballer

== Surname ==
- Abdel Nader (born 1993), Egyptian-American basketball player
- Alireza Nader, American academic
- Brooks Nader (born 1996), American model
- Claire Nader (born 1928), American social scientist
- George Nader (1921–2002), Arab-American actor and uncle of Michael Nader
- George Nader (businessman) (born 1959), Lebanese-American businessman, lobbyist, and convicted sex offender
- Habib Nasib Nader (born 1979), British actor
- Hassan Nader (born 1965), Moroccan football player
- Laura Nader (born 1930), American professor of anthropology
- Michael Nader (1945–2021), American actor
- Ralph Nader (born 1934), American attorney, citizen activist and four time third-party presidential candidate
- Rose Nader (1906–2006), American social activist and mother of Ralph Nader
- Shafeek Nader (1926–1986), community advocate and brother of Ralph Nader
- Miguel Nader (born 1981)

== See also ==
- Nadir (disambiguation)
- Nater (disambiguation), includes a list of people with surname Nater
- Tornado, slang term
