= In Defense of the Corporation =

1975 nonfiction book by Robert Hessen

In Defense of the Corporation is a nonfiction book by the business historian Robert Hessen. It was published by the Hoover Institution Press in 1979. In the book, Hessen defends the corporation as a legitimate institution against criticisms leveled by Ralph Nader and Mark J. Green in their co-written books Corporate Power in America (1973) and Taming the Giant Corporation (1976).

== Reviews ==
Academic journals reviewing In Defense of the Corporation include the Academy of Management Review, American Business Law Journal, The Bell Journal of Economics, Business History Review, Columbia Law Review, Journal of Economic Literature, Modern Age, Public Choice, Southern Economic Journal, the UMKC Law Review, and the University of Miami Law Review. The book was also reviewed in Barron's, Human Events, The New York Times, Reason, and Worldview.
