= Nater =

Nater may refer to:

== People ==
- Hamid Nater (born 1980), Moroccan footballer
- John Nater (born 1984), Canadian politician
- Marc-Sven Nater (born 1965), Swiss rower
- Stéphane Nater (born 1984), Swiss footballer
- Swen Nater (born 1950), Dutch basketball player

== Places ==
- Nater, Iran, Iranian village

== See also ==
- Nader, given name and surname
- Naters, Swiss municipality
- Naters, Netherlands, Dutch municipality
