= Carlos Heredia =

Carlos Heredia may refer to:

- Carlos Heredia (economist) (born 1956), Mexican economist and academic
- Carlos Heredia (footballer) (born 1998), Dominican football winger

== See also ==
- Juan Carlos Heredia (born 1952), Spanish football forward
