= Nadir (disambiguation) =

The nadir is a low or downward point of reference.

Nadir may also refer to:

- Nadir (name), a surname and given name
- Nadir (topography), a point of lowest local elevation
- Nadir (astronomy), the point directly underneath a celestial observer
- Nadir (web portal), a German web portal
- Nadir, U.S. Virgin Islands, a settlement
- Nadir (horse) (1955–1978), an American Thoroughbred racehorse
- Nadirs (autobiography), by Herta Müller
- "The Nadir", an episode of the television series Fargo
- The Nadir, a fictional tribe in the novel Legend and other works by David Gemmell
- "Nadir", a song by Byzantine from Oblivion Beckons
- "Nadir", a song by Sadist from Above the Light
- Network Anomaly Detection and Intrusion Reporter, an intrusion detection system
- Nadir crater, a undersea feature on the Guinea Plateau in the Atlantic Ocean
- Nadir objective vector, a concept in Multi-objective optimization

== See also ==
- Nadir of American race relations, a term for the period from the end of Reconstruction to the 1920s
- Nadira, a given name
