= Unstoppable =

Unstoppable may refer to:

== Film and television ==
- Unstoppable (2004 film), an American film directed by David Carson
- Unstoppable: Conversation with Melvin Van Peebles, Gordon Parks, and Ossie Davis, a 2005 American television documentary film
- Unstoppable (2010 film), an American film directed by Tony Scott about a runaway train
- Unstoppable (2013 film), a documentary about Kirk Cameron, directed by Darren Doane
- Unstoppable (2018 film), a South Korean film directed by Kim Min-ho
- Unstoppable (2023 film), an Indian Telugu-language comedy-drama film
- Unstoppable (2024 film), a 2024 American film directed by William Goldenberg
- Unstoppable. Sean Scully & The Art of Everything, a 2019 British television documentary film
- Unstoppable (TV series), a 2020 Netflix show
- Unstoppable (talk show), an Indian Telugu-language web show
- UFC 64: Unstoppable, a 2006 mixed martial arts pay-per-view event

== Literature ==
- Unstoppable (Nader book), a 2014 non-fiction political book by Ralph Nader
- Unstoppable (Nye book), a 2015 non-fiction science book by Bill Nye
- Unstoppable (Zook book), a 2007 non-fiction business book by Chris Zook
- Unstoppable (One Piece), a chapter of the manga series One Piece
- Unstoppable (39 Clues), the third series in the young-adult novel series The 39 Clues
- Unstoppable!, the first arc of the first volume of the Marvel Comics series The Unstoppable Wasp
- Unstoppable, a biography of Siggi B. Wilzig by Joshua M. Greene

== Music ==
=== Albums ===
- Unstoppable (Aaliyah album), unreleased
- Unstoppable (Girl Talk album), 2004
- Unstoppable (Karol G album), 2017
- Unstoppable (The Oak Ridge Boys album), 1991
- Unstoppable (Rascal Flatts album) or the title song (see below), 2009
- Unstoppable (soundtrack), by Harry Gregson-Williams from the 2010 film
- The Unstoppable (2008) and The Unstoppable International Edition (2010), by 2face Idibia
- Unstoppable, by Amara La Negra, 2019
- Unstoppable, by Amii Stewart, 1999
- Unstoppable, by DeLon, 2008
- Unstoppable, by the Planet Smashers, 2005
- Unstoppable, by Where Fear and Weapons Meet, 2001
- Unstoppable, an EP by the Score, or the title song, 2016

=== Songs ===
- "Unstoppable" (Disturbed song), 2023
- "Unstoppable" (Kat DeLuna song), 2009
- "Unstoppable" (Kid Phenomenon song), 2024
- "Unstoppable" (Lianne La Havas song), 2015
- "Unstoppable" (Ola song), 2010
- "Unstoppable" (Rascal Flatts song), 2010
- "Unstoppable" (Sia song), 2016
- "Unstoppable", by AJ Mitchell, 2019
- "Unstoppable", by the Calling from Camino Palmero, 2001
- "Unstoppable", by China Anne McClain from the A.N.T. Farm film soundtrack, 2011
- "Unstoppable", by Daniel Caesar from Never Enough, 2023
- "Unstoppable", by Foxy Shazam from Foxy Shazam, 2010
- "Unstoppable", by I-dle from We Are, 2025
- "Unstoppable", by Kylie Minogue from Disco, 2020
- "Unstoppable", by R3hab from the compilation Pepsi Beats of the Beautiful Game, 2014
- "Unstoppable", by Santogold from Santogold, 2008
- "Unstoppable", by Taylor Dayne from Naked Without You, 1998
- "Unstoppable", by TobyMac from Eye on It, 2012

== See also ==
- Unstopables, a laundry scent booster produced by Downy
- Irresistible (disambiguation)
