= Nahir =

Nahir is a given name. It may refer to:

- Nahir Besara (born 1991), Swedish footballer of Assyrian descent
- Nahir Oyal (born 1990), Swedish footballer of Assyrian-Syriac descent
- Nahir (film), a 2024 film
- Goldi Nahir, a character in Degrassi: Next Class

== See also ==
- Nadir (disambiguation)
