= Taming the Giant Corporation =

1976 nonfiction book

- Author: Ralph Nader, Mark Green, and Joel Seligman
- Language: English
- Subject: Corporate governance
- Publisher: W. W. Norton & Company
- Publication date: 1976
- Publication place: United States
- Media type: Print
- Pages: 312
- ISBN: 978-0-393-08753-6
- OCLC: 2372760

Taming the Giant Corporation is a nonfiction book by Ralph Nader, Mark Green, and Joel Seligman. It was published by W. W. Norton & Company in 1976. The book argues that large private corporations have too much power and lack accountability. It recommends that all corporations in the United States that exceed specific revenue or employment thresholds should be required to get their corporate charter from the US federal government, and these charters should come with requirements for corporate accountability.

== Reviews ==
Law professor Larry E. Blount praised the book for its "forceful presentation" and "profound message". Economist Robert Lekachman said the book's proposal for federal charters was "sophisticated and detailed", although he questioned whether it was politically viable. Contrasting the book with another recent book on corporate governance (The Modern Corporate State by legal scholar Arthur Selwyn Miller), Emory University professor Harold L. Johnson said both books were "provocative" and "worth reading", but that Miller's book was "more sophisticated and complex".

In the journal of the American Bar Association, attorney J. Randolph Ayre described the book as a propaganda effort and its proposed regulations as "onerous burdens" on businesses. In The New York Times, economic historian Robert Hessen criticized the book as poorly documented and as failing to address important questions about its proposals.

Later work on corporate social responsibility has questioned whether the types of structural reforms proposed in the book would be effective in producing the positive benefits that the authors claim.
