= The Case Against Free Trade =

1993 book by Ralph Nader

- Author: Ralph Nader
- Publisher: Earth Island Press
- Publication date: 1993
- ISBN: 9781556431692

The Case Against Free Trade: GATT, NAFTA, and the Globalization of Corporate Power is a book edited by Ralph Nader which was first published in 1993. Besides Nader himself, the chapters are authored by many well known writers, activists and politicians.

The volume is critical of the free trade system, claiming that corporations are using free trade as a cloak or smokescreen under which they intend to circumvent the democratic process to harm the health and safety of the general public. According to an excerpt from the introduction, "operating under the deceptive banner of "free" trade, multinational corporations are working hard to expand their control over the international economy and to undo vital health, safety, and economic protections won by citizen movements across the globe in recent decades."

== Contents ==
- 1. Introduction: Free Trade and the Decline of Democracy / Ralph Nader
- 2. Megatechnology, Trade, and the New World Order / Jerry Mander
- 3. Hidden Dangers of GATT and NAFTA / Lori Wallach
- 4. Free Trade Is Not Free / Edmund G. Brown, Jr.
- 5. Happily Never NAFTA: There's No Such Thing As a Free Trade / Thea Lee
- 6. Another NAFTA: What a Good Trade Agreement Should Offer / Jorge G. Castaneda and Carlos Heredia
- 7. Blind Faith and Free Trade / Margaret Atwood
- 8. Free Trade and the Third World / Martin Khor
- 9. Biodiversity and Intellectual Property Rights / Vandana Shiva
- 10. From Adjustment to Sustainable Development: The Obstacle of Free Trade / Herman E. Daly
- 11. Dolphins and GATT / David Phillips
- 12. Free Trade: The Great Destroyer / David Morris
- 13. A Bad Big idea / Wendell Berry
- 14. Agricultural Trade Liberalization: Implications for Sustainable Agriculture / Mark Ritchie
- 15. The Global Marketplace: A Closet Dictator / William Greider
