= Summit =

Point on a surface with a higher elevation than all immediately adjacent points

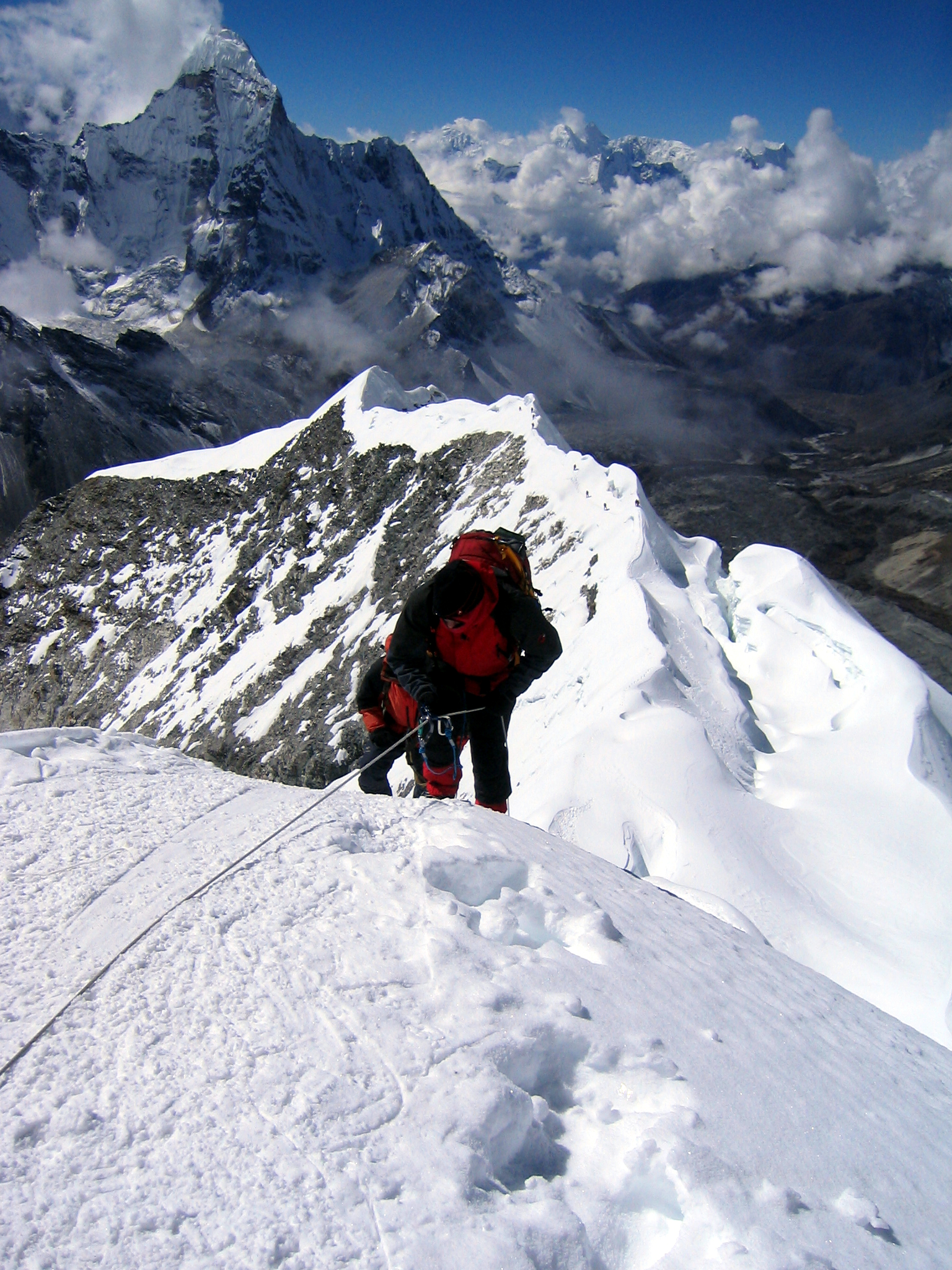
A climber taking the final few steps to the 6,160 m (20,210 ft) summit of Imja Tse (Island Peak) in Nepal, 2004

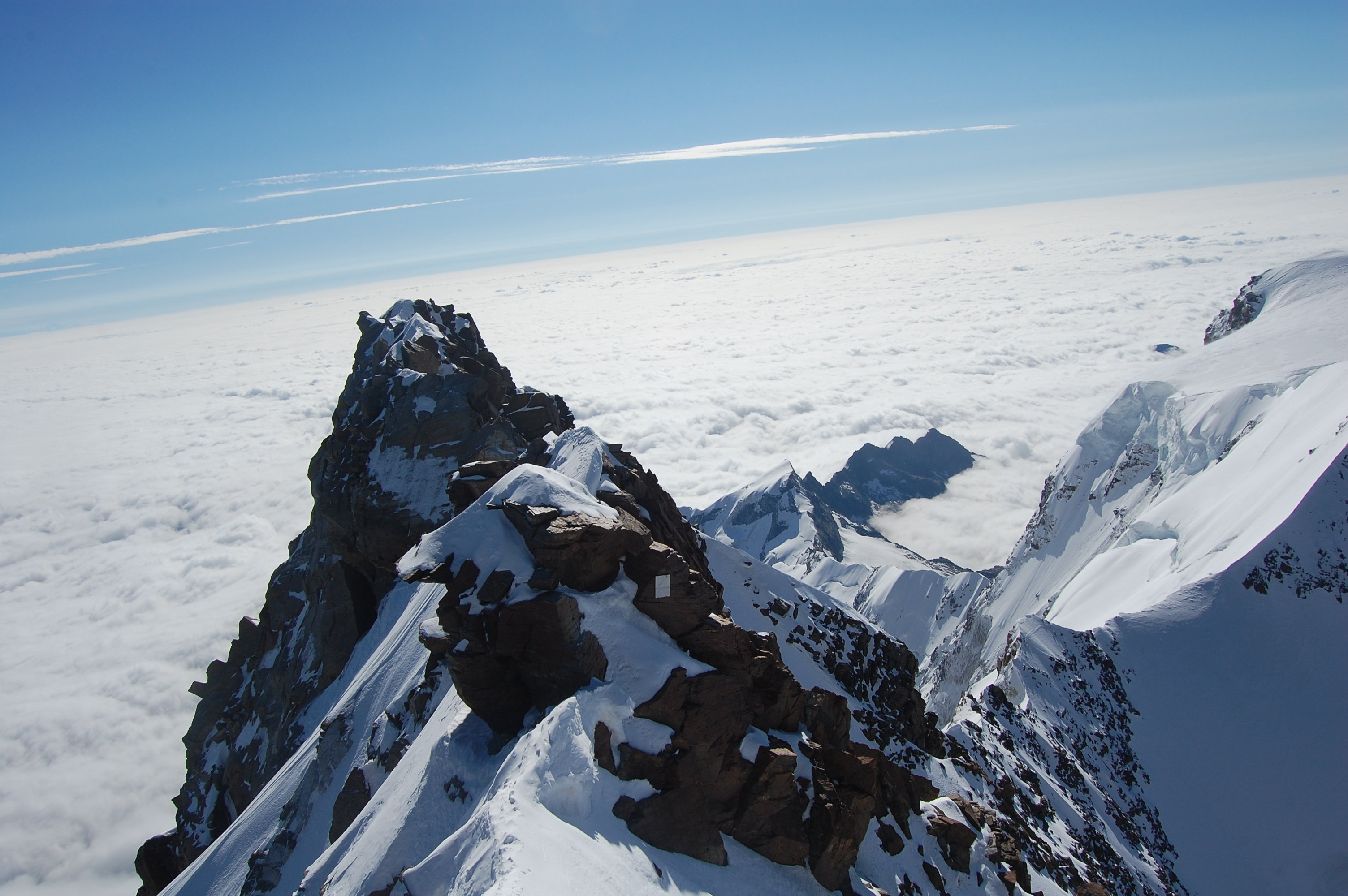
View from the summit of Switzerland's highest peak, Monte Rosa

A summit is a point on a planet's surface that is higher in elevation than all points immediately adjacent to it. The topographic terms acme, apex, peak (mountain peak), and zenith are synonymous.

The term top (mountain top) is generally used only for a mountain peak that is located at some distance from the nearest point of higher elevation. For example, a big, massive rock next to the main summit of a mountain is not considered a summit. Summits near a higher peak, with some prominence or isolation, but not reaching a certain cutoff value for the quantities, are often considered subsummits (or subpeaks) of the higher peak, and are considered part of the same mountain. A pyramidal peak is an exaggerated form produced by ice erosion of a mountain top. For summits that are permanently covered in significant layers of ice, the height may be measured by the highest point of rock (rock height) or the highest point of permanent solid ice (snow height).

The highest summit in the world is Mount Everest with a height of 8,848.86 m (29,031.7 ft) above sea level. The first official ascent was made by Tenzing Norgay and Sir Edmund Hillary. They reached the mountain's peak in 1953.

Whether a highest point is classified as a summit, a sub peak or a separate mountain is subjective. The International Climbing and Mountaineering Federation's definition of a 4,000 m peak is that it has a prominence of 30 metres (98 ft) or more; it is a mountain summit if it has a prominence of at least 300 metres (980 ft). Otherwise, it is a subpeak.

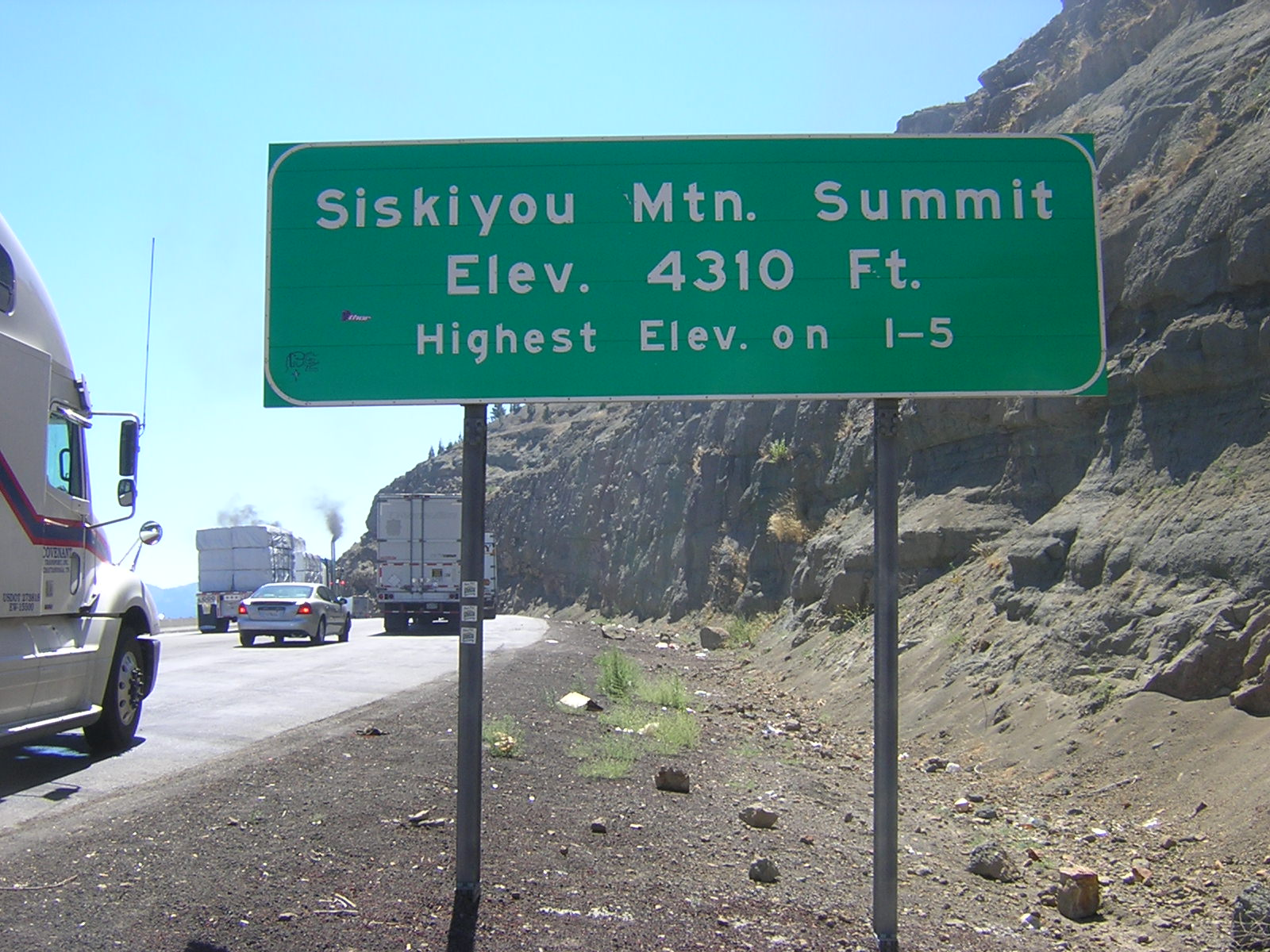
Siskiyou Mountain Summit sign along Interstate 5 in Oregon, marking the highest point along the highway at 4,310 ft (1,310 m)

Summit may also refer to the highest point along a line, trail, or route. In many parts of the Western United States, the term summit is used for the highest point along a road, highway, or railroad, more commonly referred to as a pass. For example, the highest point along Interstate 80 in California is referred to as Donner Summit and the highest point on Interstate 5 is Siskiyou Mountain Summit. This can lead to confusion as to whether a labeled "summit" is a pass or a peak.

== Gallery ==
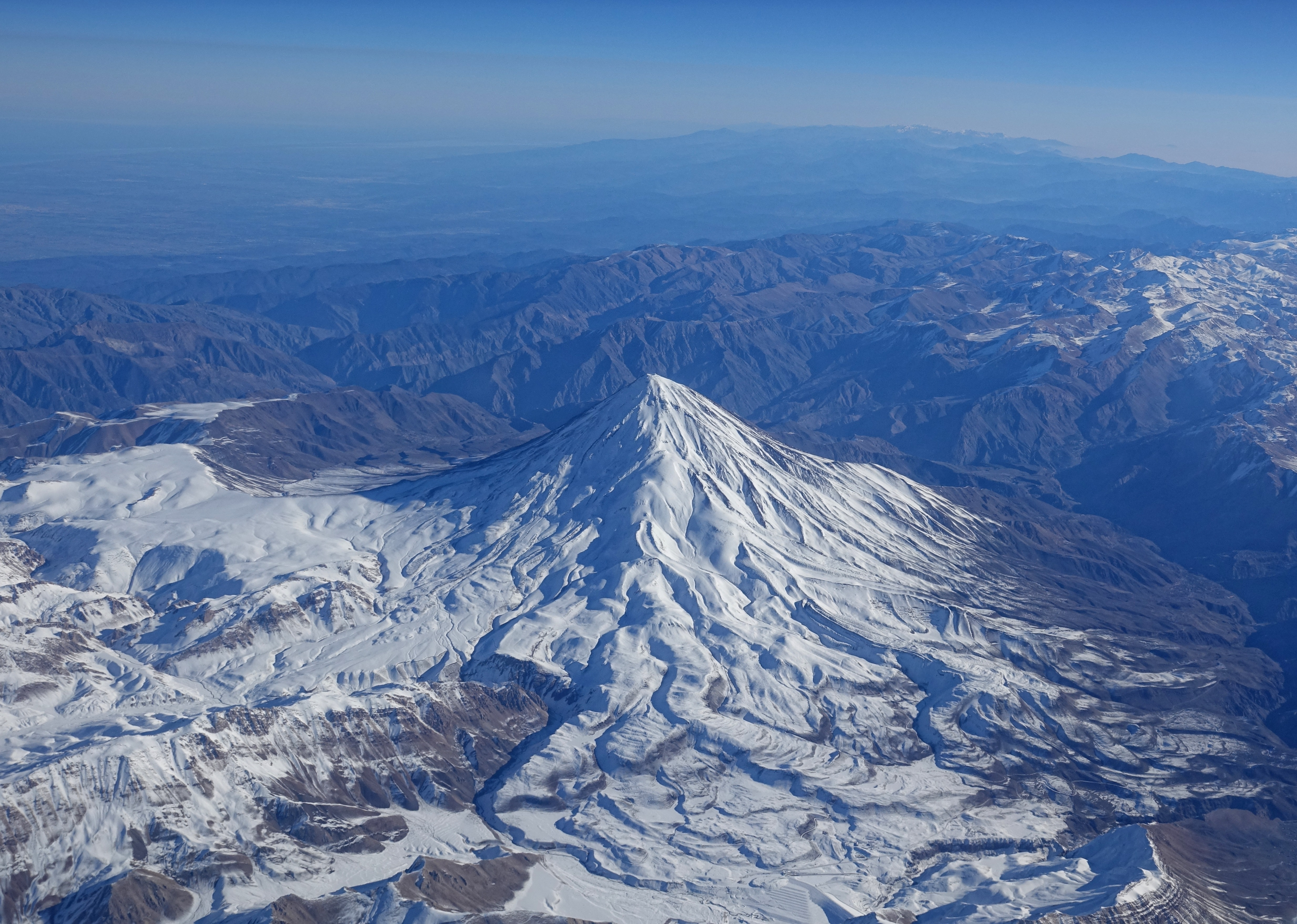
The summit of Mount Damavand, Iran

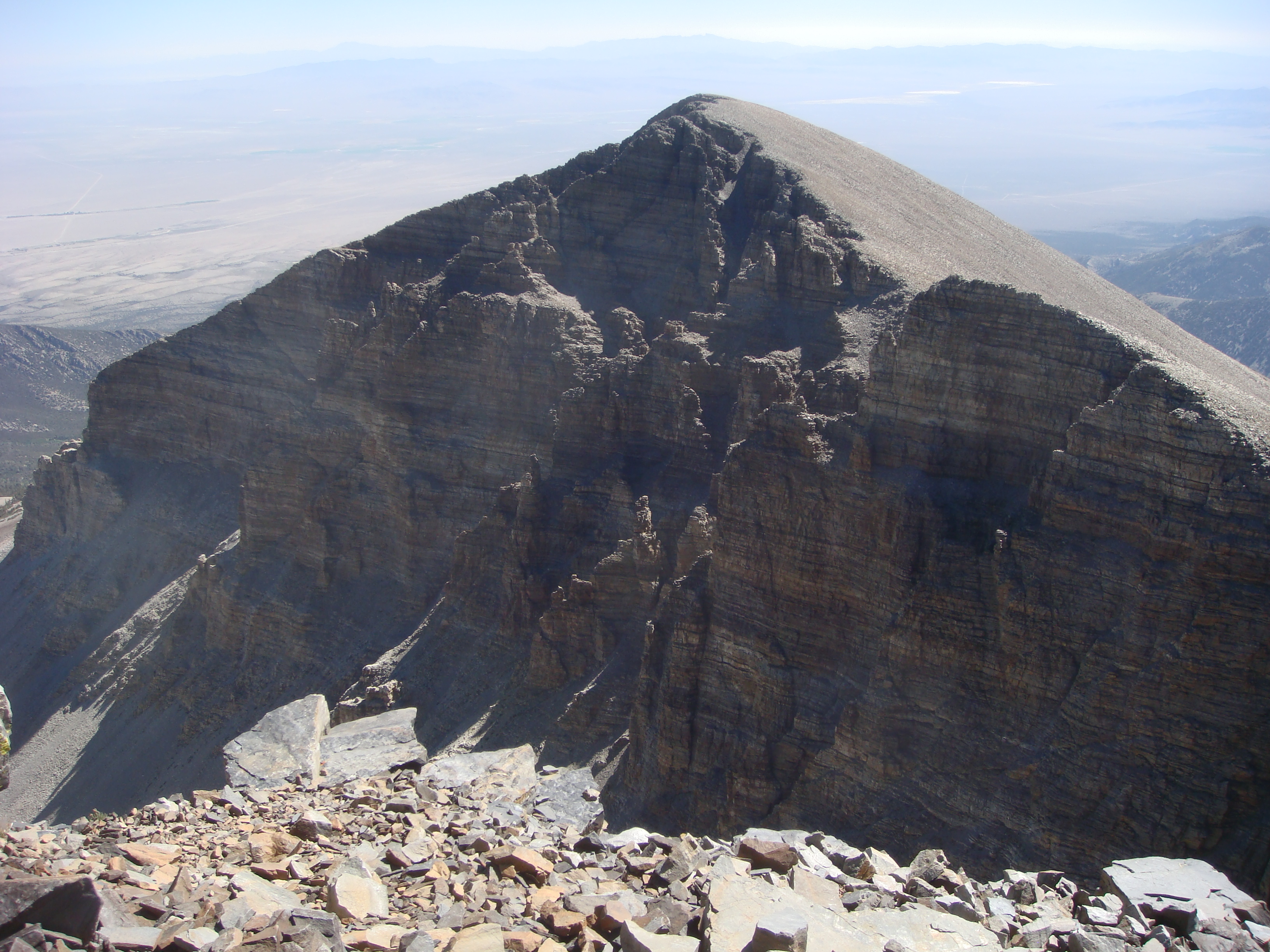
Doso Doyabi, one of the highest peaks entirely within Nevada, United States

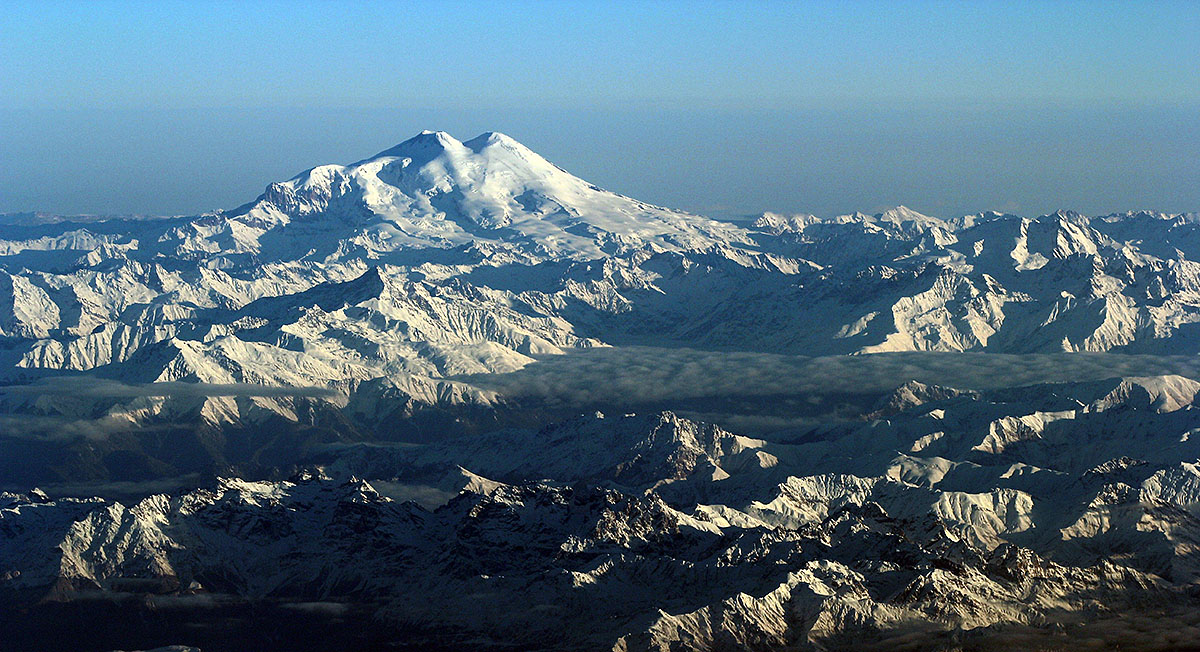
Mount Elbrus and its two peaks (Caucasus, Russia)

== See also ==
- Geoid – Ocean shape without winds and tides
- Hill – Landform that extends above the surrounding terrain
- Nadir (topography) – Lowest point in an area
- Summit accordance
- Seven Summits – Set of highest mountains on each of the seven continents
