= Democracy Dies in Darkness =

Slogan of newspaper The Washington Post

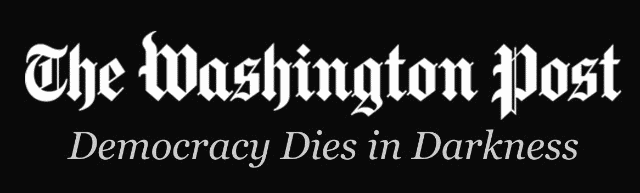
The slogan as it appeared on The Washington Post website

"Democracy Dies in Darkness" is the official slogan of the American newspaper The Washington Post, adopted in 2017. The slogan was introduced on the newspaper's website on February 22, 2017, and was added to print copies a week later. Upon its announcement, the slogan generated significant reaction – both positive and negative – from other news organizations and various media figures.

== History ==
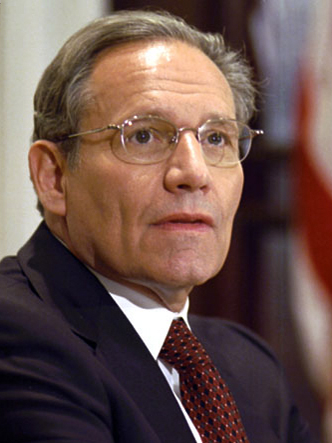
Bob Woodward popularized the phrase.

The Washington Post first unveiled the slogan via Snapchat on February 17, 2017, when it launched its Snapchat Discover platform intended for reaching younger readers, before adding it to its website under the newspaper title. Shani George, the newspaper's Communications Director, said that the phrase had been used internally within the company for years before being officially adopted.

"Democracy Dies in Darkness" was the first slogan to be officially adopted by The Washington Post in its 140-year history. According to the newspaper, the phrase was popularized by investigative journalist Bob Woodward. Woodward used the phrase in a 2007 piece criticizing government secrecy, and referenced the phrase during a 2015 presentation at a conference when he talked about The Last of the President's Men, a book he wrote about the Watergate scandal. Woodward said he did not coin the phrase himself, instead attributing the phrase to a judge ruling on a First Amendment case, believed to be from Circuit Judge Damon Keith. The paper's owner Jeff Bezos, who attended Woodward's 2015 presentation, also used the phrase in a May 2016 interview. The newspaper said it decided to adopt an official slogan in early 2016. This started a process which involved a small group of newspaper employees meeting to develop ideas for slogans. The group eventually settled on "Democracy Dies in Darkness" after brainstorming over 500 options.

The slogan appeared at the end of the Post's Super Bowl commercial in 2019. Narrated by Tom Hanks, the commercial was the newspaper's first-ever Super Bowl ad.

== Reception ==
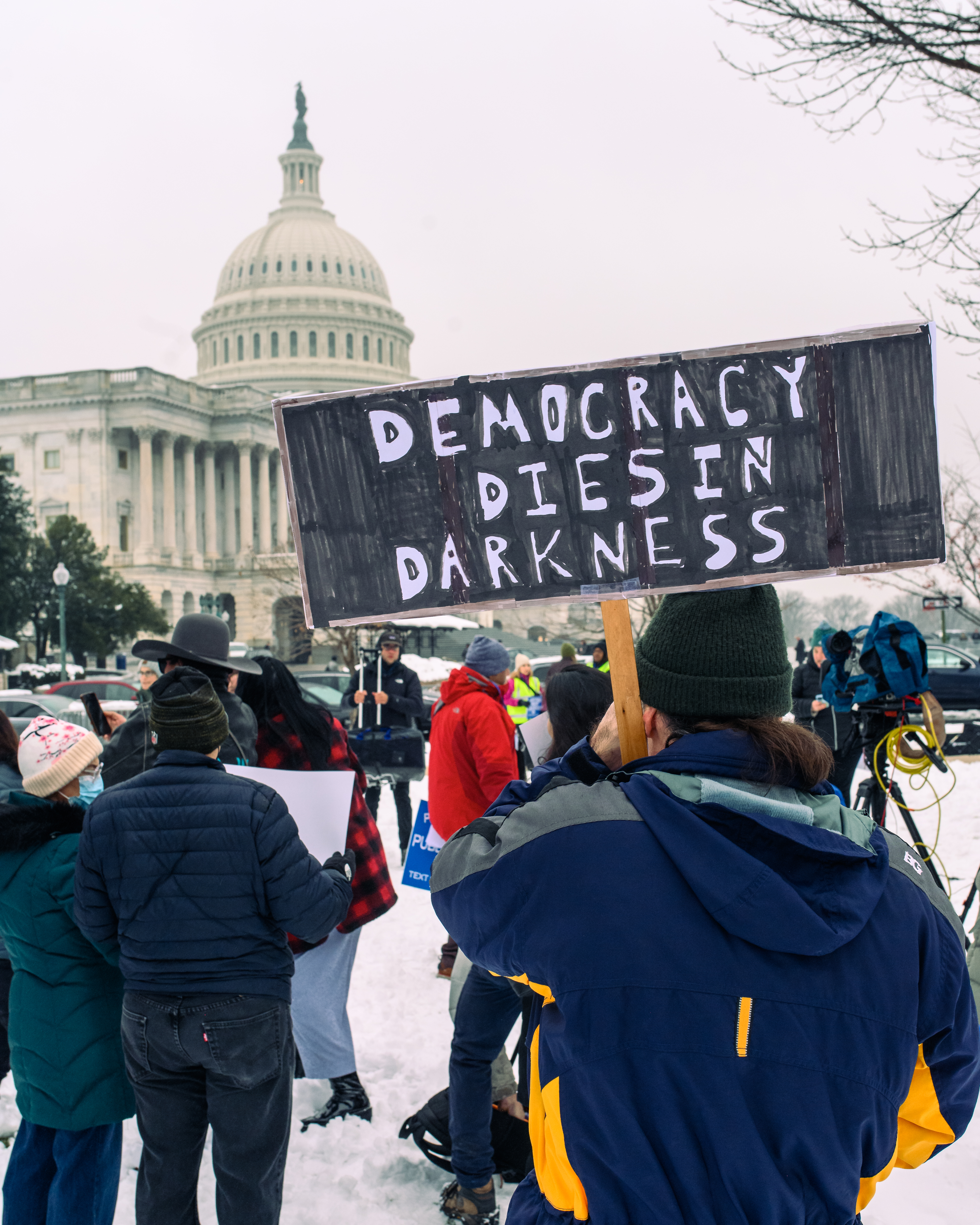
"Democracy Dies in Darkness" on a sign at a protest at the United States Capitol against Donald Trump's education policies, February 2025

The slogan generated reaction on the Internet following its announcement. On Twitter, writers at other media organizations mocked the slogan, while news organization ProPublica described the slogan as "awesome". Online magazine Slate said the slogan sounded "like a catchphrase more befitting a doomsday prophet than a daily newspaper", and compared the slogan to the titles of fifteen heavy metal albums, saying that they were "less dark" than the Washington Post slogan. Merriam-Webster dictionary recorded a surge in searches for democracy after the newspaper adopted the slogan. Dean Baquet, executive editor of The New York Times, said the slogan "sounds like the next Batman movie", while journalist Jack Shafer called the slogan "heavy-handed". Capitol Hill Citizen's motto "Democracy Dies in Broad Daylight" is intended as a jab at the slogan.

The slogan gained renewed attention following the Washington Post's refusal to endorse a candidate in the 2024 United States presidential election. Susan Rice, former United States Ambassador to the United Nations and former director of the United States Domestic Policy Council, sardonically quoted the slogan; she also condemned the Washington Post's decision as "the most hypocritical, chicken shit move from a publication that is supposed to hold people in power to account". In a statement to Vanity Fair, former Washington Post executive editor Martin Baron characterized the newspaper's refusal to endorse as "cowardice, a moment of darkness that will leave democracy as a casualty". Tommy Vietor, former spokesman for President Barack Obama and the United States National Security Council, panned the refusal as "cowardly shit from the crew that brought us 'democracy dies in darkness'."

== See also ==
- Fourth Estate
- Freedom of the press in the United States
- Journalistic objectivity
