= Capitol Hill Citizen =

Monthly newspaper founded by Ralph Nader

- Democracy Dies in Broad Daylight
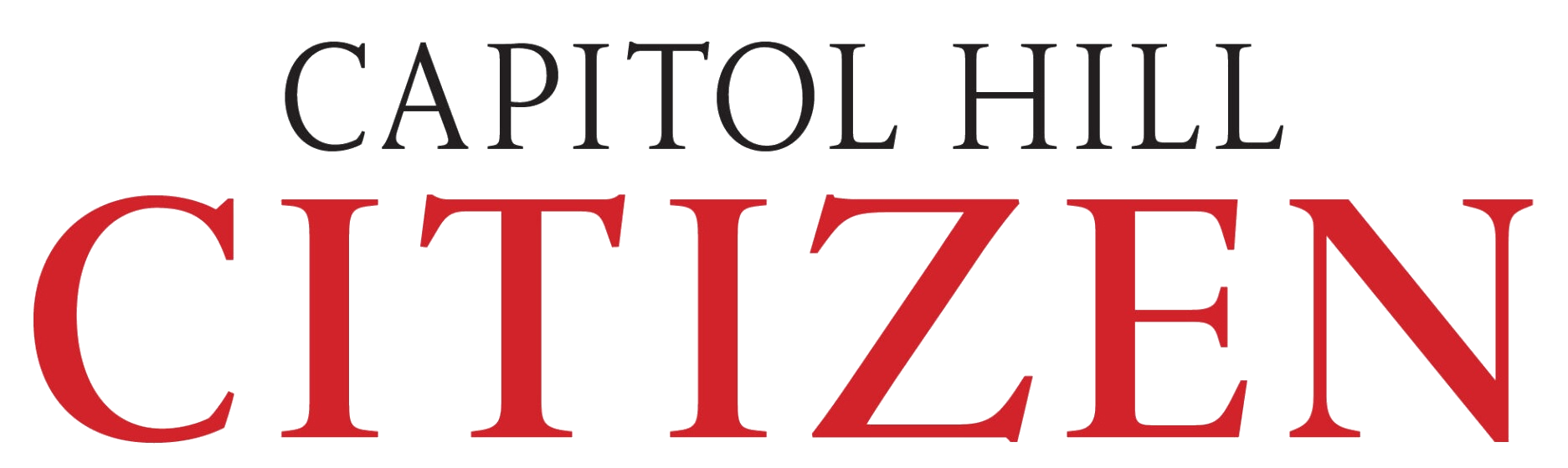
- Type: Monthly newspaper
- Format: Compact
- Founder: Ralph Nader
- Editor: Russell Mokhiber
- Founded: 2022; 4 years ago
- Language: English
- Headquarters: 1209 National Press Building, Washington, DC 20045
- Website: capitolhillcitizen.com

Capitol Hill Citizen is a monthly English-language newspaper. It was founded in the United States in 2022 by longtime consumer advocate Ralph Nader.

== Overview ==
Capitol Hill Citizen was founded by Ralph Nader in 2022 as a print-only publication due to his belief that "online is a gulag of clutter, diversion, ads, intrusions, and excess abundance". Its editor is Russell Mokhiber. It costs US$5 and is delivered by USPS mail. It is funded by subscriptions and a subsidy from the Center for the Study of Responsive Law. Its motto, "Democracy Dies in Broad Daylight", is intended as a jab at what Politico's Ian Ward described as The Washington Post's "self-important motto Democracy Dies in Darkness".

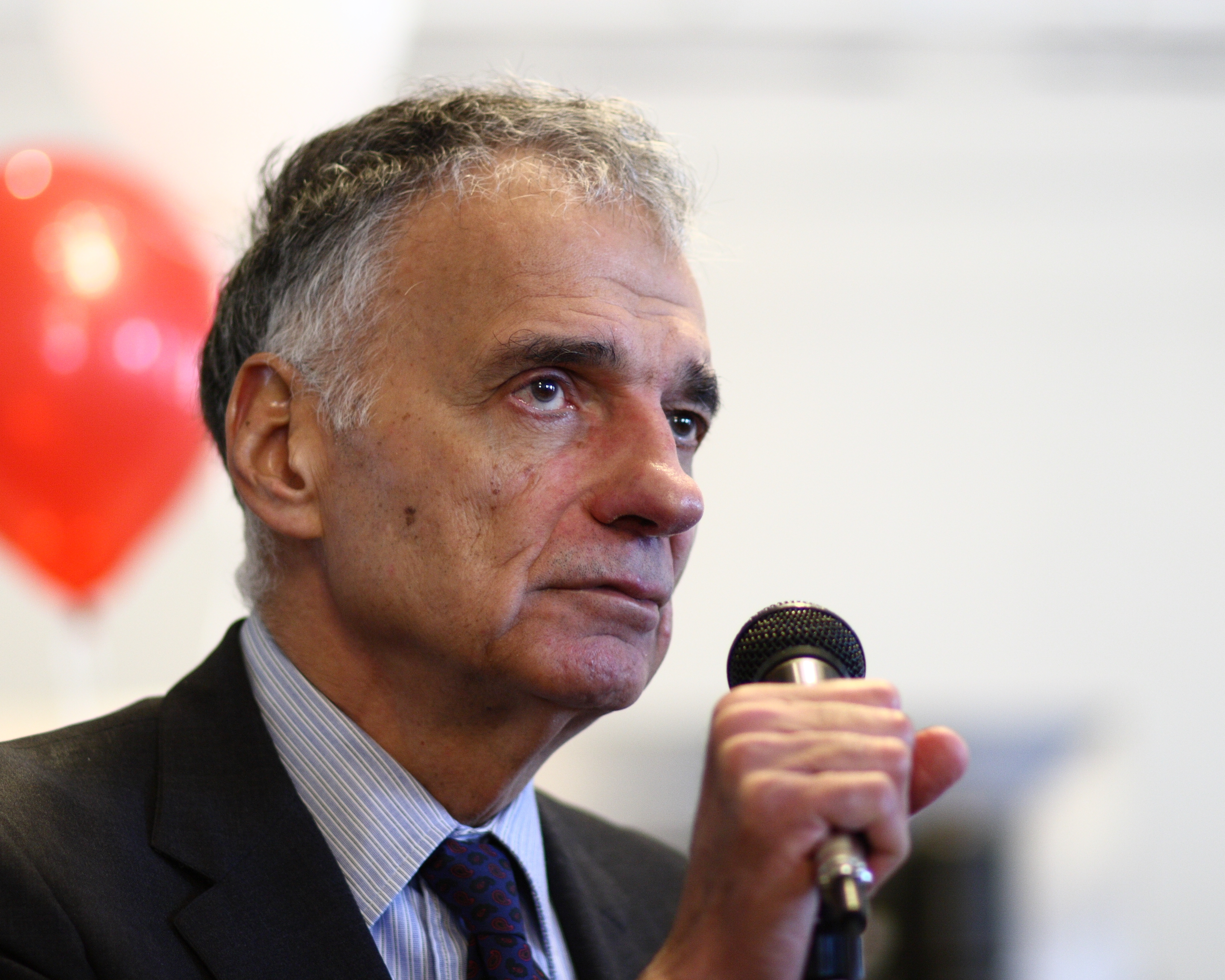
Nader in 2008

According to Politico, the paper's reporting features the "unapologetic muckraking that first propelled Nader into the national spotlight" and Capital & Main describes its content as a "deeply informed focus on how power corrupts". Subjects have included inquiries into Politico and its parent company Axel Springer's relationship with advertisers, reporting on ties between the Congressional Black Caucus and corporate America, a feature on the 2022 workplace death of Caterpillar Inc. employee Steven Dierkes, an interview with The Federalist's culture editor Emily Jashinksy, an interview with former United States Assistant Secretary of Defense Chas W. Freeman Jr., an interview with Noam Chomsky, an editorial criticizing Ron DeSantis, a listicle of the "top ten corporate crime books of 2022", and a column on a "dark money operation [that] captures and controls the Supreme Court".

== Reception ==
Chris Lehmann of The Nation magazine said, "Ralph Nader's newspaper is a salvo against D.C. media [and] a welcome throwback to a more adversarial model of legislative coverage". He said it has a "citizens-first mission ... with an unapologetically sharp-elbowed approach [to its] uphill quest to practice real and consequential journalism in an age of vacuous clout-chasing". He observed that the byline credit of "Citizen Staff" in roughly half the newspaper's articles poses "an additional liability" because this "quasi-anonymous" status is desirable against doxing but contradicts the mission of transparency and limits critical discussion in public.

== See also ==
- News media in the United States
