= Irresistible =

Irresistible may refer to:

== Film and television ==
- Irresistible (2006 film), an Australian mystery drama by Ann Turner
- Irresistible (2020 film), an American political comedy by Jon Stewart
- Irresistible (TV series), a Thai romantic drama television series
- "Irresistible" (Stargate Atlantis), a television episode
- "Irresistible" (The X-Files), a television episode

== Music ==
=== Albums ===
- Irresistible (Jessica Simpson album) or the title song (see below), 2001
- Irresistible (Tammi Terrell album), 1969
- Irresistible, by Celia Cruz, 1995
- Irresistible, by Company B, 1998
- Irresistible, by Pablo Ruiz, 1992

=== Songs ===
- "Irresistible" (Cathy Dennis song), 1992
- "Irresistible" (The Corrs song), 2000
- "Irresistible" (Fall Out Boy song), 2015
- "Irresistible" (Jessica Simpson song), 2001
- "Irresistible" (Stéphanie song) or "Ouragan", by Princess Stéphanie of Monaco, 1986
- "Irresistible" (Steve Harley & Cockney Rebel song), 1985
- "Irresistible" (Wisin & Yandel song), 2010
- "Irresistible", by Blair St. Clair from Call My Life, 2018
- "Irresistible", by Deafheaven from Sunbather, 2013
- "Irresistible", by One Direction from Take Me Home, 2012
- "Irresistible (Westside Connection)", by Mariah Carey from Charmbracelet, 2002

== Other uses ==
- HMS Irresistible, at least four ships of the Royal Navy
- Irresistible (color), a shade of cerise

== See also ==
- Irresistible force (disambiguation)
- Unstoppable (disambiguation)
- Ear-Resistible, a 2000 album by The Temptations
