= Irresistible force =

Irresistible force may refer to:

- Irresistible force paradox
- Irresistible Force (film), a 1994 American thriller
- Irresistible Force (production identity) or Mixmaster Morris (born 1965), English DJ
- "Irresistible Force" (song), by the Bee Gees, 1997
- "Irresistible Force (Met the Immovable Object)", a song by Jane's Addiction, 2011
- The Irresistible Force, a 1978 novel by Barbara Cartland

== See also ==
- Irresistible (disambiguation)
