= Steel Titan: The Life of Charles M. Schwab =

1975 nonfiction book by Robert Hessen

Steel Titan: The Life of Charles M. Schwab is a biography of the steel magnate Charles M. Schwab by the business historian Robert Hessen. It was published by the University of Pittsburgh Press in 1975.

== Reviews ==
Academic journals reviewing Steel Titan included The American Historical Review, Business History Review, Reviews in American History, Pennsylvania History, and the Pennsylvania Magazine of History and Biography. The book was also reviewed in Kirkus Reviews, The New York Times Book Review, and Reason.
