= Only the Super-Rich Can Save Us! =

2009 novel by Ralph Nader

- First edition
- Author: Ralph Nader
- Language: English
- Genre: Semi-fiction
- Publisher: Seven Stories Press
- Publication date: 22 September 2009
- Publication place: United States
- Media type: Print (hardcover)
- Pages: 736 pp
- ISBN: 1-58322-903-5
- OCLC: 351302240
- Dewey Decimal: 361.7/40973 22
- LC Class: HV27 .N33 2009

Only the Super-Rich Can Save Us! is a 2009 work of fiction by American political activist Ralph Nader, described by him as a practical utopia, in the style of Edward Bellamy's 1888 utopian novel Looking Backwards.

Nader wrote the book to inspire imaginative solutions to the problem of corrupt politicians and financial institutions.

== Similarity to Atlas Shrugged ==
Just as Atlas Shrugged, by conservative author Ayn Rand, portrayed self-interested successful capitalists working to create a "Utopia of Greed" that is free from government, Only the Super-Rich Can Save Us! portrays an altruistic group of super-rich individuals working to "re-make government", where "the rebellious rich take on the reigning rich."

The novel's protagonist is inspired by Warren Buffett. On August 14, 2011, Warren Buffett wrote an influential op-ed entitled "Stop Coddling the Super-rich", which argues that the super-rich should bear more responsibility and pay their "fair share" of taxes.
