= Nadir (name) =

Nadir is both a surname and a given name that is a variation of Nader.

In Arabic and Hebrew, it is a boy's name meaning "dear", "scarce", “rare” or "precious." (Arabic writing: نادر, Hebrew writing: נדיר)

Notable people with the name include:

== Persons ==
=== Given name ===
- Nadir Afonso (1920–2013), Portuguese painter
- Nadir Belhadj (born 1982), footballer
- Nadir Çiftçi (born 1992), Turkish footballer
- Nadir Godrej (born 1951), Indian industrialist
- Nadir Kouidri (born 1975), professionally known as Ridan, French singer
- Nadir Shah (born 1688), Iranian Monarch

=== Middle name ===
- Mehmet Nadir Ünal (born 1993), Turkish kickboxer and amateur boxer
- Mohammed Nadir Shah (1883–1933), King of Afghanistan from 1929 to 1933

=== Surname ===
- Asil Nadir (1941–2025), Turkish Cypriot businessman
- Kerime Nadir (1917–1984), Turkish writer
- Moyshe Nadir (1885–1943), American writer and satirist

=== Fictional character ===
- Zain Nadir, a The Bill character
- Abed Nadir, a Community character
- Nadir Khan, Known as "The Persian" in the Gaston Leroux novel The Phantom of the Opera, given this name in the 1990 adaptation by Susan Kay, Phantom
- Rikki Nadir, an attitude-filled rocker that can be considered an alter-ego of singer-songwriter Peter Hammill.

== See also ==
- Nadira
- Nadir
- Nader
