= Naters, Netherlands =

Coordinates: 51.877922°N 4.115753°E

Naters is a former municipality in the Dutch province of South Holland. It was located about 2 km east of the town of Rockanje, on the island Voorne-Putten.

Naters was a separate municipality from 1817 to 1855, when it became part of Rockanje.
