= Laura Nader =

American anthropologist (born 1930)

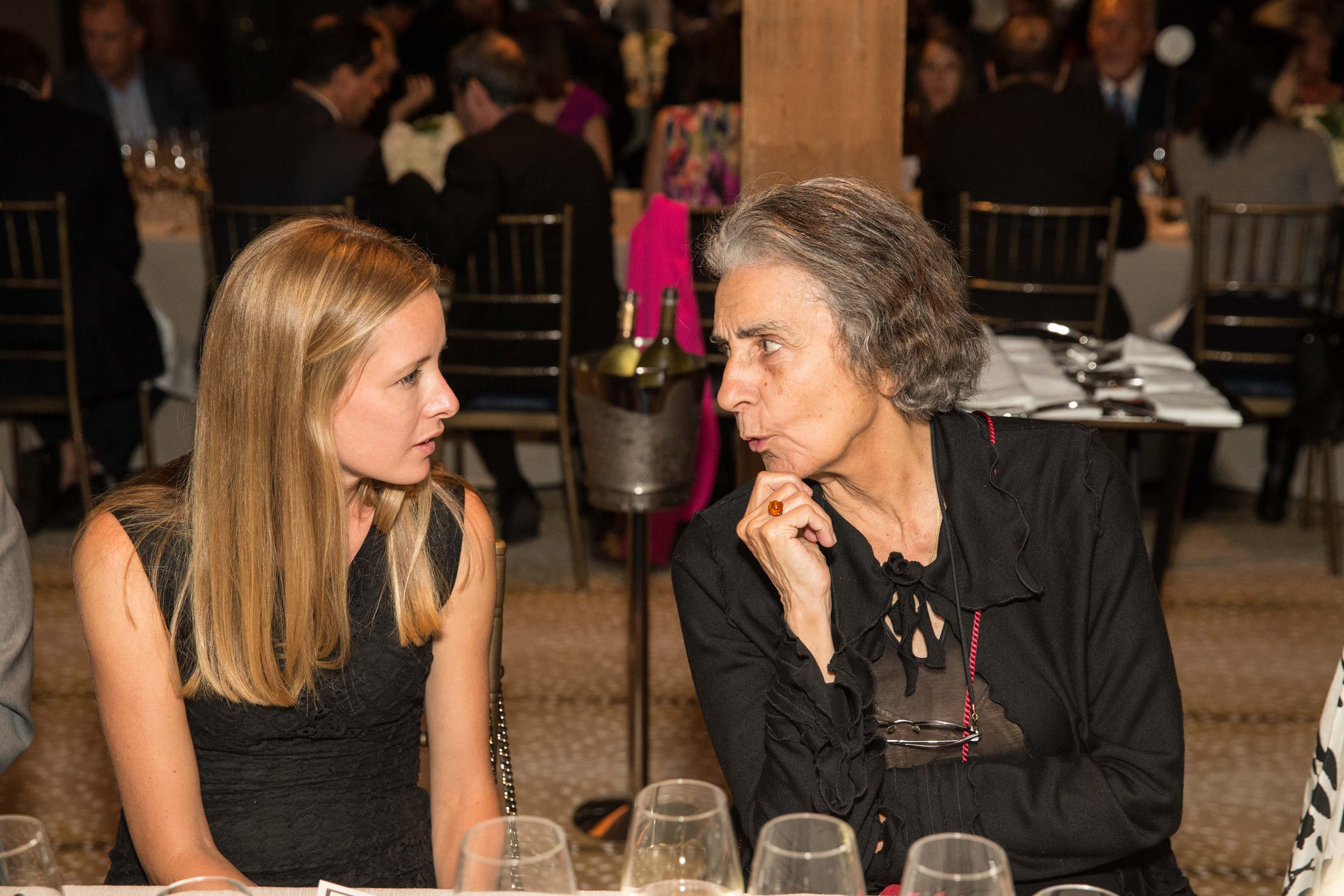
- Nader (right) in 2013
- Born: September 30, 1930 (age 96); Winsted, Connecticut, U.S.
- Occupation: Anthropologist
- Parent: Rose Nader (mother)
- Relatives: Ralph Nader (brother); Shafeek Nader (brother); Claire Nader (sister)
- Awards: See below.

Academic background
- Education: Wells College (BA); Radcliffe College (PhD)
- Doctoral advisor: Clyde Kluckhohn

Academic work
- Institutions: University of California, Berkeley
- Main interests: Comparative law, dispute resolution, kinship, religion, professional mindsets, and ethnography of the Middle East, Mexico, and United States

Laura Nader (born September 30, 1930) is an American anthropologist. She has been a professor of anthropology at the University of California, Berkeley since 1960. She was the first woman to receive a tenure-track position in the department. She is also the older sister of U.S. activist, consumer advocate, and frequent third-party candidate Ralph Nader, and the younger sister of community advocate Shafeek Nader and social scientist Claire Nader.

== Early life and education ==
Nader is a native of Winsted, Connecticut. Her father Nathra owned a restaurant/store in Connecticut, which served as a place for many political discussions. Her mother, Rose, was a schoolteacher who had a strong interest in justice and would express her views in letters to the press. Her late brother, Shafeek; her older sister, Claire and her younger brother, Ralph have all had careers working for the public good. Gamal Nkrumah (2005) profiled Dr. Nader in the weekly online news out of Egypt and commented on her loyalties to her father who emigrated from Lebanon for political reasons, “Nader is very much her father's daughter. And it was her elder brother who first suggested she read anthropology at university."

Nader received a B.A. in Latin American Studies from Wells College in Aurora, New York in 1952. She received her Ph.D. in Anthropology from Harvard University (Radcliffe College) in 1961 under the mentorship of Clyde Kluckhohn. Her education included fieldwork in a Zapotec village in Oaxaca, Mexico, and later in South Lebanon.

== Research ==
Nader's areas of interest include comparative ethnography of law and dispute resolution, conflict, comparative family organization, anthropology of professional mindsets and ethnology of the Middle East, Mexico, Latin America and the United States.

She has been involved in conferences on directing the study of law to be more integral to society, rather than insulated and isolated from other institutions as it often is now. Nader edited and published essays from these conferences and authored several books on the anthropology of law, establishing herself as one of the most influential figures in the development of the field. She has been a visiting professor at the Yale, Stanford, and Harvard Law Schools. In the 1960s she taught a joint course at the Boalt School of Law.

Some of Nader's work focuses on conflict resolution in the Zapotec village she studies. Nader notes that people in the village confront each other face to face on a personal scale. Village judicial figures strive to find solutions that are balanced, rather than placing all of the blame on one party. Nader believes this reflects their society, economic system, hierarchal structure and other institutions or variables. In contrast, she finds that in the United States, conflict often escalates to polarized blame and violence. The group of people a person may need to confront may be large, impersonal and much more powerful than themselves. She concludes that the kinds of cases people bring to court reflect areas of stress in the social structure of a community.

=== Harmony ideology ===
Nader has written extensively about "harmony ideology," an ideology centered around the belief that conflict is necessarily bad or dysfunctional and that a healthy society is one that achieves harmony between people and minimizes conflict and confrontation. She has argued in her book Harmony Ideology that harmony ideology has been spread amongst colonized peoples around the world by missionaries prior to, and facilitating, their military colonization. According to her, implementation of this ideology by the Zapotec (a group of indigenous Mexican peoples) acts as a useful counterexample to the trend. She claims the Zapotec used harmony ideology in a "counter-hegemonic" way by maintaining the appearance of "harmony" while engaging in a great deal of litigation behind the scenes. In this way, according to Nader, the Zapotec prevented the Mexican government from interfering with their relative autonomy.

Nader also argues that harmony ideology has been an important basis for a number of unsubstantiated legal ideas in the United States developed since the 1960s, including potential "litigation explosions" and Alternative Dispute Resolution (ADR) as a method for moving "garbage cases" from the courtroom into an arena that emphasizes harmony, compromise and the language of therapy over talk of injustice. Many of the then-newly appearing civil rights cases of the 1960s may have been considered such "garbage cases" at the time.

While Nader's career began with a strong interest in law and forms of social control, over time she became more interested in questions of cultural control and "controlling processes" (also the title of a popular undergraduate course she taught from 1984 until 2010), a concept described in her 1997 article, "Controlling processes: Tracing the dynamic components of power." Nader has coined the term "trustanoia" to describe the antonym of paranoia and the state of Americans' feeling of trust of others. She contends that people in the United States trust that there is always someone there to take care of them, and that everyone (including legislators and politicians) acts in their interest.

=== Studying up ===
One of Nader's best-known contributions was her highly controversial 1969 article, "Up the anthropologist--Perspectives gained from studying up," which was "one of the first calls to anthropologists to think more about the 'study of the colonizers rather than the colonized, the culture of power rather than the culture of the powerless, the culture of affluence rather than the culture of poverty.'" This article influenced many anthropologists to begin "studying up," though many more misinterpreted Nader without studying "down" and "sideways." Nader's works for the field of anthropology and discipline have led her to be described as "the embodied moral conscience of post-Boasian American anthropology."

== Awards ==
- Morgan Spanish Prize, Wells College
- Wells College Alumnae Award, Wells College
- Radcliffe College Alumnae Award
- Center for Advanced Study in the Behavioral Sciences
- Woodrow Wilson Center for Advanced Study in Washington, D.C.
- Harry Kalven Prize (1995), Law and Society Association
- American Anthropological Association, Distinguished Lecture Award (2000), American Anthropological Association
- CoGEA (Committee on Gender Equity in Anthropology) Award (aka "The Squeaky Wheel Award") (2010)

== Publications ==
Nader is the author or coauthor of over 280 published books and articles, including:

- Laura Nader (1964). Talea and Juquila; a comparison of Zapotec social organization. University of California Press. OCLC 2958459.
- Laura Nader (1965). The ethnography of law. Menasha, Wisconsin: American Anthropological Association. OCLC 3075225.
- Laura Nader; Wenner-Gren Foundation for Anthropological Research (1969). Law in culture and society. Chicago: Aldine Publishing Company. OCLC 59266.
- Laura Nader; Thomas Maretzki (1973). Cultural illness and health; essays in human adaptation. Washington: American Anthropological Association. OCLC 741222.
- Laura Nader; University of California; Berkeley. Dept. of Anthropology (1976). The Kroeber Islanders; a handbook of anthropology at Berkeley. University of California, Dept. of Anthropology. OCLC 29557308.
- Laura Nader; Harry F Todd (1978). The Disputing process : law in ten societies. New York: Columbia University Press. ISBN 0-231-04536-0.
- Laura Nader (July 1980). Energy Choices in a Democratic Society. National Academy of Sciences. ISBN 0-309-03045-5.
- Laura Nader (August 1981). No Access to Law: Alternatives to the American Judicial System. Academic Press. ISBN 0-12-513562-9.
- Laura Nader (1990). Harmony ideology : justice and control in a Zapotec mountain village. Stanford University Press. ISBN 0-8047-1809-1.
- Laura Nader (1994). Essays on controlling processes. Berkeley, CA: Kroeber Anthropological Society. OCLC 31980852.. Reprinted in 1996 OCLC 36139409, 2002 OCLC 50922612 and 2005 OCLC 68178289.
- Laura Nader (1996). Naked science : anthropological inquiry into boundaries, power, and knowledge. New York: Routledge. ISBN 0-415-91464-7.
- Laura Nader (1997). Law in culture and society. University of California Press. ISBN 0-520-20833-1.
- Laura Nader (2002). The life of the law : anthropological projects. University of California Press. ISBN 0-520-22988-6. Reprinted in 2005 ISBN 0-520-23163-5.
- Ugo Mattei; Laura Nader (2008). Plunder: When the Rule of Law is Illegal. Blackwell Publishers. ISBN 978-1-4051-7894-5. Printed in 2008 ISBN 978-1-4051-7894-5.
- Laura Nader (2010). The Energy Reader. Wiley-Blackwell Publishers. ISBN 978-1405199841.
- Laura Nader (2010). "Side by Side: The Other Is Not Mute" in Edward Said: A Legacy of Emancipation and Representation. Adel Iskandar and Hakem Al Rustom, editors. University of California Press.
- Laura Nader (2012). Culture and Dignity: Dialogues Between the Middle East and the West. Wiley-Blackwell Publishers. ISBN 978-1118319017.
- Laura Nader (2015). What the Rest Think of the West: Since 600AD. University of California Press. ISBN 978-0520285781.
- Laura Nader (2018). Contrarian Anthropology: The Unwritten Rules of Academia. Berghahn Books. ISBN 978-1785337086.

== Films ==
- Laura Nader (1966) To Make the Balance 33 min.
- Laura Nader (1980) Little Injustices- Laura Nader Looks at the Law 60 min.
- Laura Nader (2011) Losing Knowledge: Fifty Years of Change 40 min.
