= Nadira =

Nadira, Nadirah, or Nodira is a feminine given name of Arabic origin. Notable people with the name include:

== Given name ==
- Nadira (Indian actress) (1932–2006), an Indian actress of the 1950s and 1960s, best known for her roles as a temptress
- Nadira (Pakistani actress) (1968–1995), Pakistani actress in Punjabi and Urdu films
- Nadira Babbar (born 1948), Indian actress and producer
- Nadira Begum (died 2023), Bangladeshi folk singer
- Nadira Banu Begum (1618–1659), Mughal princess
- Nadira Ilana, Malaysian filmmaker
- Nadira Isayeva (born 1979), Russian journalist
- Nadira Yeasmin Jolly, Bangladeshi politician
- Nadira Majumder (born 1953), Bangladeshi writer
- Nadirah McKenith (born 1991), American basketball player
- Nadira Naipaul (born 1953), Pakistani journalist
- Nadira Ait Oumghar (born 1994), Algerian volleyball player
- Nadirah Shakoor, American singer
- Nadira Sultan (born 1956), Indian politician
- Nadirah X, Jamaican hip-hop artist
- Nina Nadira Naharuddin (born 1992), Malaysian singer, actress and TV host
- Nodira (sometimes spelled in Russian as Nadira, 1792–1842), Uzbek writer, wife of Muhammad Umar Khan
- Nodira Akhmedova (born 2005), Kazakhstani taekwondo practitioner
- Nodira Gulova (born 1988), Uzbekistani judoka
- Nodira Nadirjanova (born 1990), Uzbekistani chess player

== Fictional characters ==
- One of the villains in Power Rangers: Time Force
- Nadira, a character in the 2005 novel Skybreaker by Kenneth Oppel
- Al-Nadirah, character of the Hatra legend

== See also ==
- Nadir (name)
