= Nadir (topography) =

Lowest point in an area

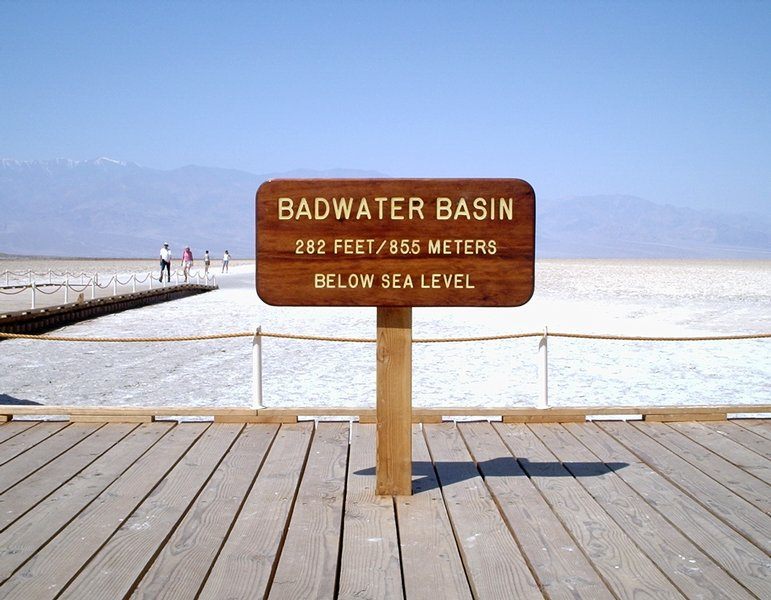
The Badwater Basin in Death Valley, California, the nadir of the North American Continent

In topography, a nadir is a point on a surface that is lower in elevation than all points immediately adjacent to it. Mathematically, a nadir is a local minimum of elevation. A nadir may be the lowest point of a dry basin or depression, or the deepest point of a body of water or ice. The nadir of a body of water is often called a "deep", as in the Challenger Deep, the nadir of the Earth's oceans.

== See also ==
- Depression (geology)
- Endorheic basin
- Geoid
- List of places on land with elevations below sea level
- Maxima and minima
- Summit (topography) (antonym)
- Topography
