= Unstoppable (Nader book) =

Book by Ralph Nader

Unstoppable: The Emerging Left-Right Alliance to Dismantle the Corporate State
- First edition
- Author: Ralph Nader
- Language: English
- Publisher: Nation Books
- Publication date: 2014
- Publication place: United States
- Media type: Print (hardback & paperback)
- Pages: 224 pp
- ISBN: 9781568584546
- OCLC: 871186827
- Dewey Decimal: 322/.30973
- LC Class: JK467 .N34 2014

Unstoppable: The Emerging Left–Right Alliance to Dismantle the Corporate State is a non-fiction book by American consumer advocate and politician Ralph Nader, published in 2014 by Nation Books. Nader argues that there are many issues which progressives, libertarians and conservatives can agree on, such as opposition to "free trade" agreements, too much Wall Street influence in Washington, opposition to "corporate welfare", preservation of civil liberties, opposition to foreign military entanglements, etc., and that by working together they can defeat entrenched interest groups and achieve their desired policy outcomes.

According to a review Paul J. Nyden wrote in The Charleston Gazette,

Their agreements often center on our government's aggressive foreign interventions and wars, under both Republican and Democratic presidents, as well as the huge of amount of federal tax dollars spent to benefit a handful of large corporations and defense contractors.

A review in The Washington Post notes,

It's a backhanded compliment to Nader that the stampede of corporate lobbyists into Washington starting in the 1970s began as an effort to counter him.

Conservative writer and activist Grover Norquist has endorsed the book and concept, saying, "Right and left coalitions are areas of principle agreement, on perhaps procedure or even goals. Not a compromise where somebody walks in and gives up part of their soul in order to get something that moves — they think — slightly in the wrong direction, in the hope of doing something else." Reviews tended to focus on Nader's career and on describing the content of the book.

The book was the subject of interviews with Mr. Nader on C-SPAN, Democracy Now!, and The Tavis Smiley Show.

A community gathering based on the book was held in Washington, D.C.
