= Shafeek Nader =

American community advocate

- Born: March 6, 1926
- Died: October 19, 1986 (aged 60)
- Education: University of Toronto
- Organization: Northwestern Connecticut Community College
- Parent(s): Rose Bouziane; Nathra Nader
- Relatives: Ralph Nader (brother); Laura Nader (sister); Claire Nader (sister)

Shafeek Nader (Arabic: شفيق نادر) (6 March 1926 – 19 October 1986) was the first son of Rose Nader, and older brother of Ralph, Laura, and Claire Nader. He was a community advocate and the principal founder of Northwestern Connecticut Community College. After his death in 1986, the Shafeek Nader Trust was created in his honor. Nader was a graduate of the University of Toronto.

== Biography ==
Shafeek Nader was born March 6, 1926 in Winsted, Connecticut to Rose and Nathra Nader, who ran a local restaurant. He served in the U.S. Navy in World War II, and returned to Winsted to finish high school, graduating from the Gilbert School in 1947.

He graduated from the University of Toronto in 1952 with a degree in anthropology and studied law at Boston University. In 1965, he and a group of friends founded Northwestern Connecticut Community College, of which he served as the chairman of the board. Nader went on to work for the American Association of Community and Junior Colleges.

On October 19, 1986, he died of prostate cancer in San Diego.

== See also ==
- Joe A. Callaway Award for Civic Courage
