= Robert Hessen =

American economic and business historian (1936–2024)

- Born: September 1936; New York City, New York, U.S.
- Died: April 15, 2024 (aged 87); Stanford, California, U.S.

Academic background
- Education: Queens College (BA); Harvard University (MA); Columbia University (PhD)

Robert Hessen (September 1936 – April 15, 2024) was an American economic and business historian. He was a professor at the Graduate School of Business at Stanford University and a senior research fellow at Stanford's Hoover Institution. He was an Objectivist and authored several books, analyzing business and economic issues from an Objectivist perspective.

== Early life and education ==
Robert Hessen was born in New York City. He received his Bachelor of Arts from Queens College, his Master of Arts from Harvard University, and then his Doctor of Philosophy from Columbia University.

== Career ==
External videos
- Remarks on Ayn Rand—Excepts of an interview with Hessen for the 2005 documentary Birth of Objectivism by Duncan Scott.

Prior to joining the Hoover Institution and taking his position at Stanford, he taught at the Graduate School of Business at Columbia University.

He was associated with philosopher Ayn Rand for 25 years, contributed articles to two of her periodicals, as well as her book, Capitalism: The Unknown Ideal. He was a featured commentator on Milton Friedman's award-winning PBS television documentary series, Free to Choose.

In 1985, Hessen joined the Board of Advisors of the newly formed Ayn Rand Institute. In 2000, he joined the Board of Advisors of The Journal of Ayn Rand Studies.

Among the books he wrote are Steel Titan: The Life of Charles M. Schwab and In Defense of the Corporation. He was also the editor of the multi-volume series Hoover Archival Documentaries. He was featured in shorter works in such diverse publications as The New York Times, Barron's, Business History Review, Labor History, The Hastings Law Journal and the Journal of Law and Economics. His essays, discussing capitalism and presenting a private-property-and-contractual model of corporations, were published in the Fortune Encyclopedia of Economics and the Concise Encyclopedia of Economics.

Hessen died at Stanford Hospital on April 15, 2024, at the age of 87.

== Books ==
Hessen's books include:

- Steel Titan: The Life of Charles M. Schwab (University of Pittsburgh Press, 1975)
- In Defense of the Corporation (Hoover Institution Press, 1979)
- Does Big Business Rule America? (edited, Ethics and Public Policy Center, 1982)
- Berlin Alert: The Memoirs and Reports of Truman Smith (edited, Hoover Institution Press, 1984)
- Breaking with Communism: The Intellectual Odyssey of Bertram D. Wolfe (edited, Hoover Institution Press, 1990)
