= Claire Nader =

American social scientist

- Born: July 18, 1928 (age 98)
- Education: Smith College, Columbia University
- Occupations: Social scientist, educator
- Organization: Shafeek Nader Trust for the Community Interest
- Relatives: Ralph, Laura, Shafeek Nader

Claire Nader (born July 18, 1928) is an American social scientist and author. She was the first social scientist at Oak Ridge National Laboratory (ORNL), and was chairman of the Council for Responsible Genetics.

== Early life ==
Born July 18, 1928, she is the sister of Ralph, Laura, and Shafeek Nader. Her mother Rose Nader and her father Nathra Nader had married in Lebanon in 1925, and shortly afterwards moved to Danbury, Connecticut, followed by Winsted, Connecticut, where the Nader children spent their childhoods.

She graduated Smith College in 1950, with a major in Latin American studies. Her Ph.D. from Columbia University is in public law and government, with the political science awarded by Columbia's Department of Public Law and Government. Her dissertation was entitled "American Natural Scientists in the Policy Process: Three Atomic Energy Issues and Their Foreign Policy Implications".

== Career ==
=== Teaching and Oak Ridge ===
In 1956, she became an instructor in the department of social sciences at New York City Community College. Next she served as a research assistant for the Council for Atomic Age Studies from 1961 to 1963. During the 1960s she worked with Alvin Weinberg at Oak Ridge National Laboratory (ORNL), where she conducted civil defense research related to the potential societal aftereffects of a nuclear weapons attack.

She was the first social scientist at ORNL, where she was director of Science in Society Studies in the Oak Ridge Institute of Nuclear Studies from 1963–1966. In 1967, while at Oak Ride, she organized a global conference on Science and Technology in Developing Countries.

=== Boards and community projects ===
After leaving ORNL she extended her interests and became known in community activist issues relating to corporate and government policies as they affect local communities. She served as a chairman of the board of directors of the Council for Responsible Genetics from 1994–1996, is a trustee of Safety Systems, and was an editor for Sage Publications.

In 1996, she was involved as an incorporator of a newly formed company overseeing Winsted Memorial Hospital, named the Community Trust for Winsted Hospital.

As of 2005, she was head of the Shafeek Nader Trust for the Community Interest. Nader is the President of the Shafeek Nader Trust for the Community Interest which seeks to advance the ability of citizens to participate and shape the quality of democracy in their community. According to ProPublica, the organization's tax filings for 2024 list Claire Nader as president and treasurer.

An author, in 2022, she published the book You Are Your Own Best Teacher!, about social activism and youth.

== Residences ==
She has maintained homes in both Washington, DC and Winsted, Connecticut, her hometown. As of August 2026, she and her younger brother Ralph live in a house in Washington, DC.

== Selected publications ==
- Claire Nader. The Technical Expert in a Democracy, Bulletin of the Atomic Scientists, May 1966.
- Claire Nader (1968). "A Letter in Health Physics" in Health Physics, Printed in Northern Ireland, Pergamon Press. Vol. 14, pp. 379–381.
- Claire Nader (1969). Technical Experts in Developing Countries, in Science and Technology in Developing Countries, eds. C. Nader and A. B. Zahlan. Cambridge University Press.
- Claire Nader (1975). The Dispute Over Safe Uses of X-Rays in Medical Practice, in "Health Physics" Vol. 29, No.1, pp. 181–206.
- Claire Nader (September 1975). "The Need and Desirability for Problem-Focused Research on The Interrelationships Between Science and Technology and Values and Ethics" April 29, 1975. Also AAAS Interdisciplinary Workshop on the Interrelationships Between Science and Technology and Ethics and Values.
- Claire Nader (1976). "The Energy of Waste and the Problem of Informed Choices," in Energy and the Environment Cost-Benefit Analysis, R.A. Karam and K.Z. Morgan, eds. Energy – An International Jr. New York: Pergamon Press, pp. 625–629.
- Claire Nader (1977). "Comment" in Toxic Substances and Trade Secrecy, Technical Information Project, Washington, D.C., pp. 63–66.
- Claire Nader (June 1978). "Cultural Factors: Unresolved Issues in the Conflict Between Individual Freedom and Social Control" New York Academy of Sciences Conference on Public Control of Environmental Health Hazards.
- Claire Nader (1979). Controlling Environmental Health Hazards: Corporate Power, Individual Freedom and Social Control, Annals of New York Academy of Sciences, Volume 329, Public Control of Environmental Health Hazards. Pages 213–220, October 1979.
- Claire Nader and Laura Nader (1985). A Wide Angle on Regulation, in Regulatory Policy and the Social Sciences, R. Noll, ed. University of California Press, pp. 141–160.
- Claire Nader (1986). Technology and Democratic Control: The Case of Recombinant DNA, in The Gene Splicing Wars. American Association for the Advancement of Science, eds., R.A. Zilinskas and B.K. Zimmerman, New York: Macmillan Publishing Company.
- Claire Nader (February 1989). Changing the Way We Look at Science and Technology in Politics and The Life Sciences Vol. 7, No. 2.
- Claire Nader (2022). You Are Your Own Best Teacher! Sparking the Curiosity, Imagination, and Intellect of Tweens. Washington, D.C.: Essential Books, 2022.
