= Carlos Heredia (economist) =

Mexican economist and academic

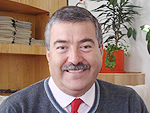
- Carlos Heredia

Member of Mexico's 57th Congress
- In office 1997–2000

Governor of the State of Michoacán
- In office 2003–2008

Mexican Council on Foreign Relations (Comexi)
- In office 2003–2006

Personal details
- Born: October 18, 1956 Tampico, Tamaulipas
- Occupation: Politician/Economist

Military service
- Allegiance: Mexico

Carlos Heredia is a Mexican economist and academic born in Tampico, Tamaulipas, in 1956. Heredia served as a (PRD) Member of Mexico's 57th Congress from 1997 to 2000.

He has held senior positions with Mexico’s Treasury Department and the Government of Mexico City. He was Senior Advisor on International Affairs to Lázaro Cárdenas-Batel, Governor of the State of Michoacán, from 2003 to 2008. He was the economic and international affairs spokesperson of the presidential campaign of Cuauhtémoc Cárdenas in 2000 and has since been his advisor in the Foundation for Democracy.

Heredia has worked for almost thirty years with development NGOs, including two of Mexico's leading organizations of civil society, Equipo PUEBLO and Iniciativa Ciudadana para la Promoción de la Cultura del Diálogo.

In 2005 he was part of the Independent Task Force on Building a North American Community, sponsored by the Council on Foreign Relations. He serves on the Advisory Board of the Mexico Institute at the Woodrow Wilson International Center for Scholars in Washington, D.C.

He is a founding member and current associate of the Mexican Council on Foreign Relations (Comexi) and served as its Vice president during 2003-2006. He served as the Co-Director of the Binational Task Force on the U.S.-Mexico Border, sponsored by Comexi and the Pacific Council on International Policy (PCIP) in 2009.

== Education and academic career ==
Heredia completed his undergraduate studies at the Instituto Tecnológico Autónomo de México (ITAM) in Mexico City, earned a master's degree in economics from McGill University in Montreal, and holds a PhD in economics from the National Autonomous University of Mexico (UNAM). Since 2009 he has been an associate professor in the Department of International Studies at the Center for Research and Teaching in Economics (CIDE) in Mexico City.

== Writing and media ==
Heredia has authored seven books and more than 80 articles, book chapters, research reports and working papers on foreign policy, international cooperation and development, migration, North American integration, multilateral banking and Mexico–China relations. He writes a regular column for El Universal.
