= Rose Nader =

Lebanese-American activist (1906–2006)

- روز نادر
- Born: Rose Bouziane; 7 February 1906; Zahlé, Ottoman Empire
- Died: 20 January 2006 (aged 99); Winchester, Connecticut, United States
- Occupation: Activist
- Spouse: Nathra Nader (m. 1925; died 1991)
- Children: Shafeek, Claire, Laura, and Ralph

Rose Nader (Arabic: روز نادر; February 7, 1906 – January 20, 2006; born Rose Bouziane (Arabic: روز بوزين) was a Lebanese-American activist in her hometown of Winsted, Connecticut. She was the mother of U.S. activist, consumer advocate, and frequent third-party candidate Ralph Nader, professor Laura Nader, community advocate Shafeek Nader, and social scientist Claire Nader.

== Early life ==
Rose Bouziane was born in Zahlé, Ottoman Empire, modern day Lebanon. She taught high school French and Arabic, as the first woman teacher to teach outside of her hometown, before she married Nathra Nader in 1925. They immigrated to the United States, and soon settled in Winsted, Connecticut. At home, Rose Nader grew her own vegetables and refused to serve processed food. She also limited or banned certain foods due to her worries about carcinogens.

== Career ==
In 1955, she confronted U.S. Senator Prescott Bush over a catastrophic flood in Winsted and convinced him to work on a dry-dam proposal that was later completed. Nader also fought for better water quality standards in Winsted. and advocated building a community center for children. She volunteered in Peace Action and Co-op America.

In 1991, she published a healthy-food cook book, It Happened in the Kitchen: Recipes for Food and Thought (ISBN 0-936758-29-5). The book was inspired by Lebanese cuisine and includes wisdom from her husband. The proceeds from the book went towards the Shafeek Nader Trust. To promote the book, she appeared on The Phil Donahue Show and the Home Show.

== Personal life and death ==
Nader's first son, Shafeek Nader, died in 1986. Nader worked as the president of the Shafeek Nader Trust for the Community Interest. Rose Nader has received inquiries over the years about how she raised her "outstanding children," including Ralph Nader and Laura Nader. As a parent, she emphasized encouraging her children to use their imaginations.

Nader died in her home at the age of 99 (18 days short of her 100th birthday) on January 20, 2006, from congestive heart failure. Soon after, a memorial was held and her son Ralph was among those who addressed the gathering. In reference to her as a mother, he called her "our anchor, compass and vision." Her family announced plans to donate 100 red rosebushes to the community and residents of Winsted in memory of her nearly 100 years of life.
