= Ralph Nader =

American lawyer and activist (born 1934)

- Nader in 2000
- Born: February 27, 1934 (age 92); Winsted, Connecticut, U.S.
- Education: Princeton University (BA); Harvard University (LLB)
- Occupations: Lawyer; activist; environmentalist; author
- Political party: Democratic (1952–1996); Green (1996–2003); Independent (2004–present)
- Mother: Rose Nader
- Relatives: Shafeek Nader (brother); Claire Nader (sister); Laura Nader (sister)
- Awards: Gandhi Peace Award; Horchow Award for Public Service by a Private Citizen; Automotive Hall of Fame
- Military career
- Allegiance: United States
- Branch: United States Army
- Service years: 1959
- Website: Official website

Ralph Nader (/ˈneɪdər/; born February 27, 1934) is an American lawyer and political activist involved in consumer protection, environmentalism, and government reform causes. He has been a presidential candidate repeatedly. His 1965 book Unsafe at Any Speed, which criticized the automotive industry for its safety record, helped lead to the passage of the National Traffic and Motor Vehicle Safety Act in 1966.

The son of Lebanese immigrants to the United States, Nader attended Princeton University and Harvard Law School. He quickly developed an interest in vehicle designs that were hazardous and contributed to elevated levels of car accidents and fatalities. Published in 1965, Unsafe at Any Speed became a highly influential critique of the safety record of American automobile manufacturers, focusing on General Motors' Chevrolet Corvair automobile in particular.

Following the publication of Unsafe at Any Speed, Nader led a group of volunteer law students—dubbed "Nader's Raiders"—in an investigation of the Federal Trade Commission, leading directly to that agency's overhaul and reform. In the 1970s, Nader leveraged his growing popularity to establish a number of advocacy and watchdog groups including the Public Interest Research Group, the Center for Auto Safety, and Public Citizen. Two of Nader's most notable targets were the Chevy Corvair and the Ford Pinto.

Nader made four bids to become President of the United States, running with the Green Party in 1996 and 2000 and as an independent in 2004 and 2008. In each campaign, Nader said he sought to highlight under-reported issues and a perceived need for electoral reform. He won nearly three million votes in the 2000 United States presidential election, and for that reason there were allegations that his candidacy that year helped Republican candidate George W. Bush win a close election against Democratic candidate Al Gore.

A two-time Nieman Fellow, Nader is the author or co-author of more than two dozen books and was the subject of a documentary film on his life and work, An Unreasonable Man, which debuted at the 2006 Sundance Film Festival. He has been repeatedly named to lists of the "100 Most Influential Americans", including those published by the magazines Life, Time, and The Atlantic. He was described by The New York Times as a "dissident".

== Early life and education ==
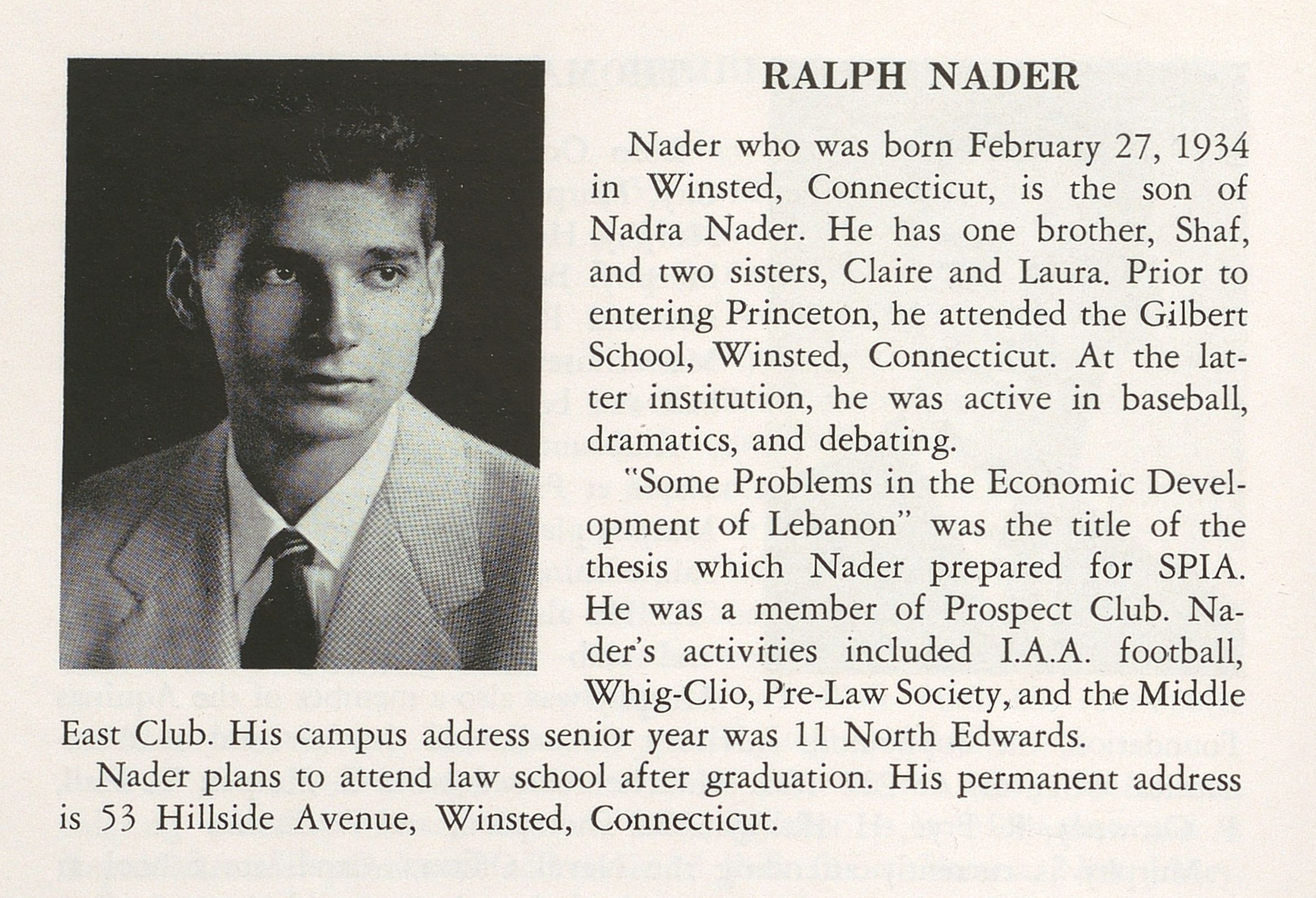
Nader in the Princeton University yearbook, 1955

Ralph Nader was born on February 27, 1934, in Winsted, Connecticut, to Rose (née Bouziane) and Nathra Nader, both of whom were Antiochian Greek Christian immigrants from Mount Lebanon and the Beqaa Valley in Southeastern Lebanon. After settling in Connecticut, Nathra Nader worked in a textile mill before opening a bakery and restaurant. Ralph Nader occasionally helped at his father's restaurant; he also worked as a newspaper delivery boy for the local paper, the Winsted Register Citizen. Nader graduated from The Gilbert School in 1951, going on to attend Princeton University. Though he was offered a scholarship to Princeton, his father forced him to decline it on the grounds that the family was able to pay Nader's tuition and the funds should go to a student who could not afford it. Nader graduated magna cum laude and Phi Beta Kappa with a Bachelor of Arts from the Woodrow Wilson School of Public and International Affairs in 1955 after completing a senior thesis titled "Lebanese Agriculture".

After graduating from Princeton, Nader enrolled at Harvard Law School, though he quickly became bored by his courses. While at Harvard, Nader would frequently skip classes to hitchhike across the U.S. where he would engage in field research on Native American issues and migrant worker rights. He earned a Bachelor of Laws (LL.B.) from Harvard in 1958. Nader identified with libertarian philosophy in his youth, but gradually shifted away in his early 20s. Although Nader acknowledged that he "didn't like public housing because it disadvantaged landlords unfairly", his viewpoint changed when he "saw the slums and what landlords did". After graduating from Harvard, Nader served in the U.S. Army as a cook and was posted to Fort Dix.

== Career ==
=== Early history ===
In 1959, Nader was admitted to the bar and began practice as a lawyer in Hartford, Connecticut, while also lecturing at the University of Hartford and traveling to the Soviet Union, Chile, and Cuba, where he filed dispatches for the Christian Science Monitor and The Nation. In 1964, he moved to Washington, D.C., taking a position as a consultant to Assistant Secretary of Labor Daniel Patrick Moynihan.

=== Unsafe at Any Speed ===
Nader gained national attention with the 1965 publication of his journalistic exposé Unsafe at Any Speed. The book, critical of the automotive industry, argued that many American automobiles were generally unsafe to operate. For the book, Nader researched case files from more than a hundred lawsuits then pending against General Motors' Chevrolet Corvair to support his assertions.

The book became an immediate bestseller, but also prompted a backlash from General Motors (GM), which attempted to discredit Nader. GM tapped Nader's phone in an attempt to obtain salacious information and, when that failed, GM hired prostitutes in an attempt to catch him in a compromising situation. Nader, by then working as an unpaid consultant to United States Senator Abe Ribicoff, reported to the senator that he suspected he was being followed. Ribicoff convened an inquiry that called GM CEO James Roche who admitted, when placed under oath, that the company had hired a private detective agency to investigate Nader. Nader sued GM for invasion of privacy, settling the case for $425,000 and using the proceeds to found the activist organization known as the Center for the Study of Responsive Law.

A year following the publication of Unsafe at Any Speed, Congress unanimously enacted the National Traffic and Motor Vehicle Safety Act. Speaker of the United States House of Representatives John William McCormack said the passage of the National Traffic and Motor Vehicle Safety Act was brought about by the "crusading spirit of one individual who believed he could do something: Ralph Nader".

=== "Nader's Raiders", Public Citizen and Center for Auto Safety ===
In 1968, Nader recruited seven volunteer law students, dubbed "Nader's Raiders" by the Washington press corps, to evaluate the efficacy and operation of the Federal Trade Commission (FTC). The group's ensuing report, which criticized the body as "ineffective" and "passive" led to an American Bar Association investigation of the FTC. Based on the results of that second study, Richard Nixon revitalized the agency and sent it on a path of vigorous consumer protection and antitrust enforcement for the rest of the 1970s.

Nader's Raiders became involved in such issues as nuclear safety, international trade, regulation of insecticides, meat processing, pension reform, land use, and banking.

Following the publication of the report, Nader founded the watchdog group Public Citizen in 1971 to engage in public interest lobbying and activism on issues of consumer rights. He also served on its board of directors until 1980.

Nader founded the Center for Auto Safety, which for 40 years, published an annual guide on new car safety ratings, preventative maintenance and repair costs, fuel economy, insurance costs, warranty coverage, and complaints: "The Car Book".

=== 1970s–1990s ===
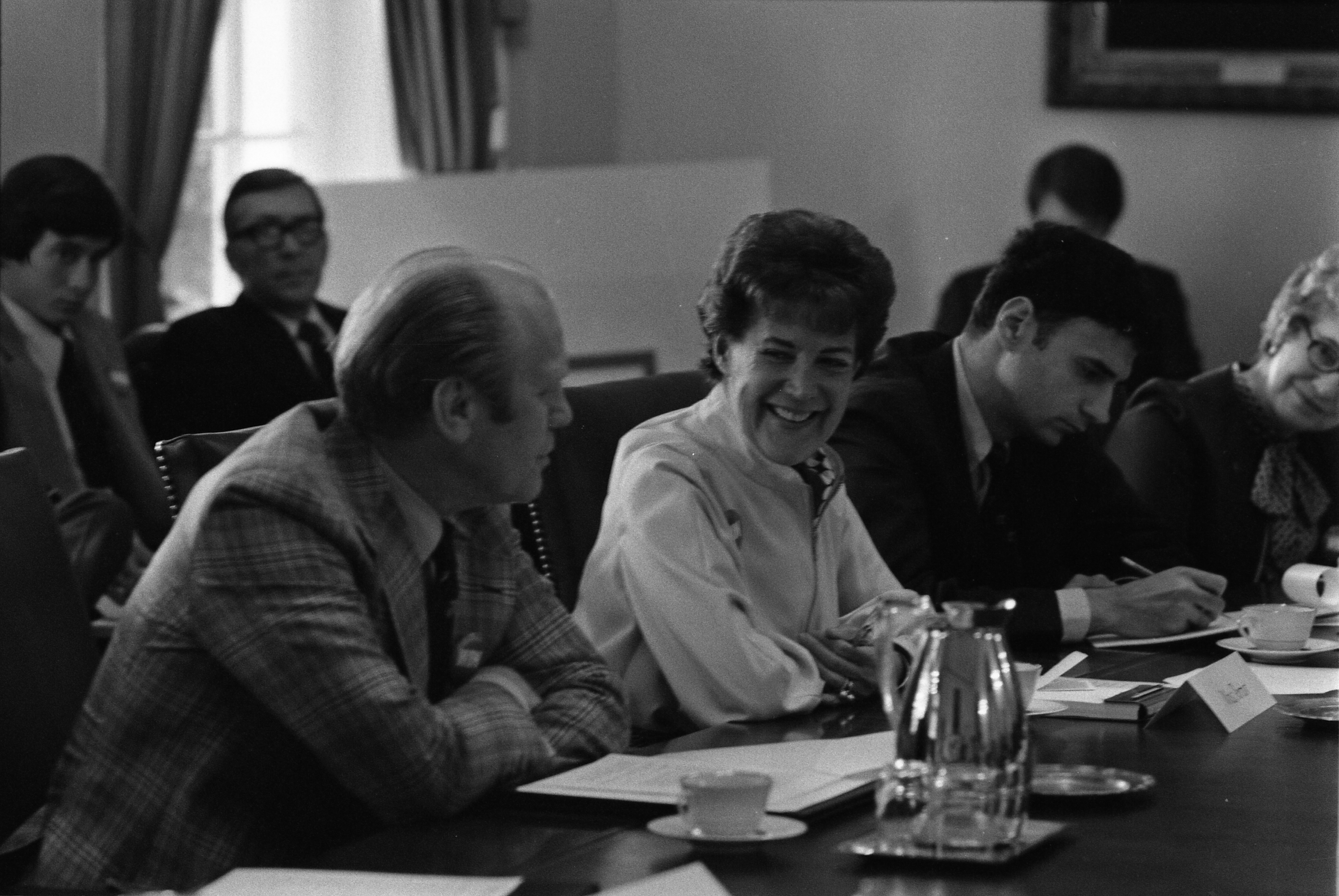
Nader, far right, at a meeting with Sylvia Porter and U.S. president Gerald Ford in 1974

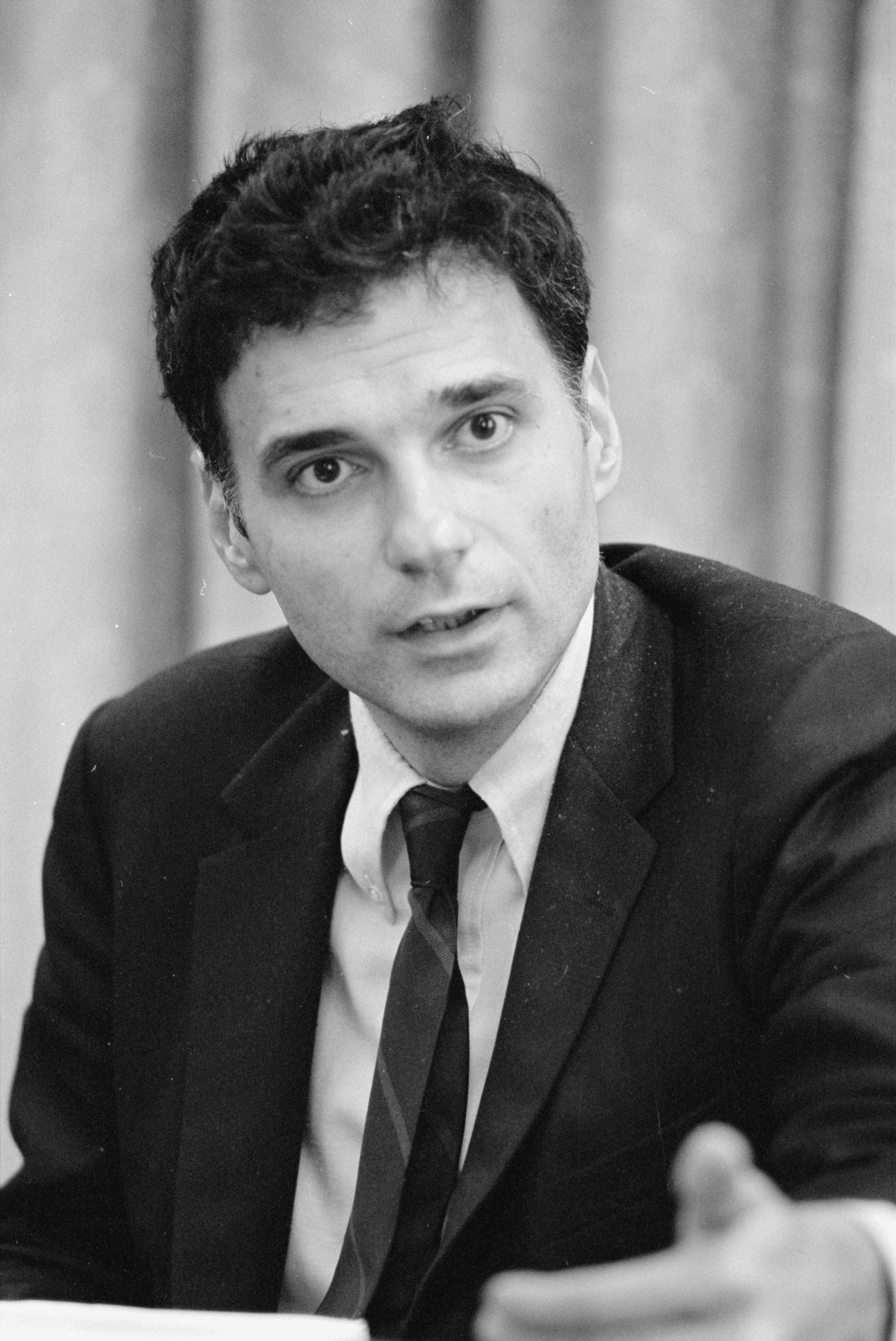
Nader in 1975

By the early 1970s Nader had established himself as a household name. In a critical memo written by Lewis Powell to the U.S. Chamber of Commerce, Powell warned business representatives that Nader "has become a legend in his own time and an idol of millions of Americans".

Ralph Nader's name appeared in the press as a potential candidate for president for the first time in 1971, when he was offered the opportunity to run as the presidential candidate for the New Party, a progressive split-off from the Democratic Party. Chief among his advocates was author Gore Vidal, who touted a 1972 Nader presidential campaign in a front-page article in Esquire magazine in 1971. Nader declined the advances.

In 1973, Ralph Nader was plaintiff in the case against acting attorney general Robert Bork, who under orders of President Richard Nixon had fired special prosecutor Archibald Cox in the so-called Saturday Night Massacre, an action that was ultimately ruled illegal by federal judge Gerhard Gesell.

In 1974, Nader received the S. Roger Horchow Award for Greatest Public Service by a Private Citizen.

In the 1970s, Nader turned his attention to environmental activism, becoming a key leader in the antinuclear power movement, described by one observer as the "titular head of opposition to nuclear energy". The Critical Mass Energy Project was formed by Nader in 1974 as a national anti-nuclear umbrella group, growing to become the largest national anti-nuclear group in the United States, with several hundred local affiliates and an estimated 200,000 supporters. The organization's main efforts were directed at lobbying activities and providing local groups with scientific and other resources to campaign against nuclear power.

Nader lectures at Florida State University, 1980s

Throughout the 1970s and 1980s, through his ongoing work with Public Citizen, Nader continued to be involved in issues of consumer rights and public accountability. His work testifying before Congress, drafting model legislation, and organizing citizen letter-writing and protest efforts, earned him direct credit for the enactment of the Freedom of Information Act, Foreign Corrupt Practices Act, Clean Water Act, Consumer Product Safety Act, and Whistleblower Protection Act.

Nader testified in the 1994 hearings for the nomination of Stephen Breyer to the Supreme Court, arguing against Breyer's confirmation. He criticized Breyer's record on antitrust law.

In the late 1990s, Nader accused Microsoft of being a monopoly and organized a conference featuring Microsoft's critics from the tech world.

In 1999, Nader was unsuccessfully approached by Nike to appear in an advertisement. The firm offered Nader $25,000 to say "another shameless attempt by Nike to sell shoes" while holding Air 120 sneakers. After Nader turned down the offer, the corporation hired filmmaker Spike Lee.

=== Presidential campaigns ===
==== 1972 ====
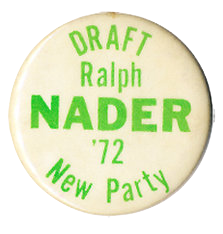
Campaign button from the 1972 effort to draft Nader to be the candidate for the New Party

Ralph Nader's name appeared in the press as a potential candidate for president for the first time in 1971, when he was offered the opportunity to run as the presidential candidate for the New Party, a progressive split-off from the Democratic Party in 1972. Chief among his advocates was author Gore Vidal, who touted a 1972 Nader presidential campaign in a front-page article in Esquire magazine in 1971. Psychologist Alan Rockway organized a "draft Ralph Nader for President" campaign in Florida on the New Party's behalf. Nader declined their offer to run that year; the New Party ultimately joined with the People's Party in running Benjamin Spock in the 1972 presidential election. Spock had hoped Nader in particular would run, getting "some of the loudest applause of the evening" when mentioning him at the University of Alabama. Spock went on to try to recruit Nader for the party among over 100 others, and indicated he would be "delighted" to be replaced by any of them even after he accepted the nomination himself. Nader received one vote for the vice-presidential nomination at the 1972 Democratic National Convention.

==== 1980 ====
In the 1980 presidential election, the progressive-oriented Citizens Party approached Nader with the prospect of running as their presidential nominee. Nader declined their offer, stating "I will never run for president". The party ended up nominating biologist Barry Commoner instead.

==== 1992 ====
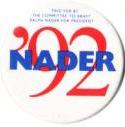
Button from 1992

Nader stood in as a write-in for "none of the above" in both the 1992 New Hampshire Democratic and Republican primaries and received 3,054 of the 170,333 Democratic votes and 3,258 of the 177,970 Republican votes cast. He was also a candidate in the 1992 Massachusetts Democratic primary.

==== 1996 ====
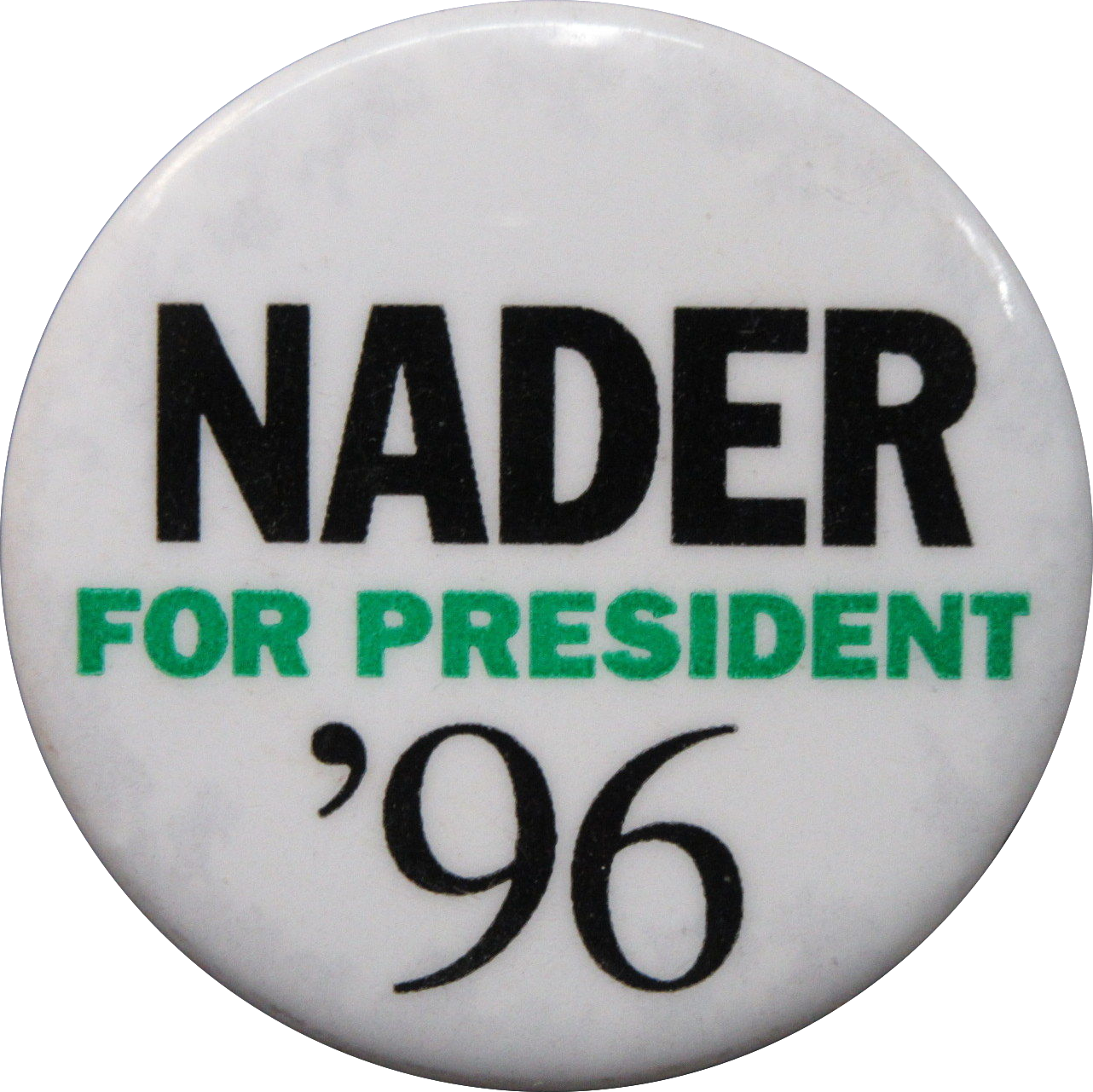
Campaign button from 1996

Nader was drafted as a candidate for President of the United States on the Green Party ticket during the 1996 presidential election. He was not formally nominated by the Green Party USA, which was, at the time, the largest national Green group; instead he was nominated independently by various state Green parties (in some states, he appeared on the ballot as an independent). However, many activists in the Green Party USA worked actively to campaign for Nader that year. Nader qualified for ballot status in 22 states, garnering 685,297 votes or 0.71% of the popular vote (fourth place overall), although the effort did make significant organizational gains for the party. He refused to raise or spend more than $5,000 on his campaign, presumably to avoid meeting the threshold for Federal Election Commission reporting requirements. The unofficial Draft Nader committee could (and did) spend more than that, but the committee was legally prevented from coordinating in any way with Nader himself.

Nader received some criticism from gay rights supporters for calling gay rights "gonadal politics" and stating that he was not interested in dealing with such matters. In July 2004, however, he publicly stated that he supported same-sex marriage.

His 1996 running mates included: Anne Goeke (nine states), Deborah Howes (Oregon), Muriel Tillinghast (New York), Krista Paradise (Colorado), Madelyn Hoffman (New Jersey), Bill Boteler (Washington, D.C.), and Winona LaDuke (California and Texas).

==== 2000 ====
In the 2006 documentary An Unreasonable Man, Nader described how he was unable to get the views of his public-interest groups heard in Washington, even by the Clinton Administration. Nader cited this as one of the primary reasons why he decided to actively run in the 2000 election as candidate of the Green Party, which had been formed in the wake of his 1996 campaign.

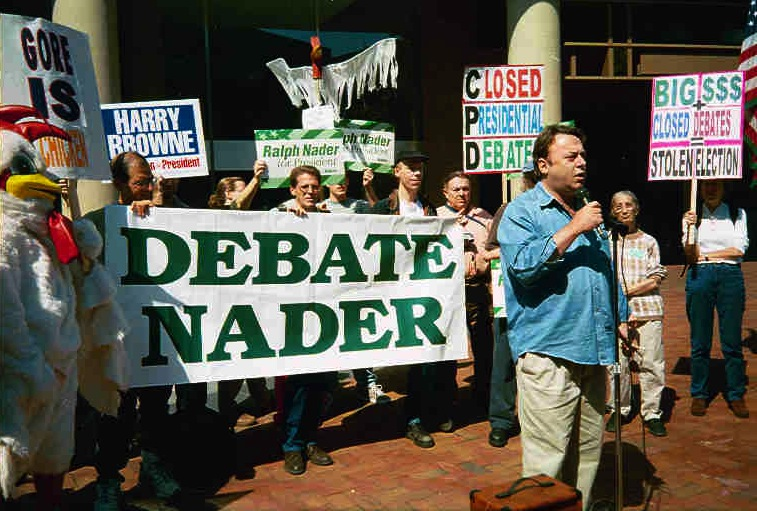
Nader's supporters, with Christopher Hitchens speaking, protest his exclusion from the televised debates in 2000

In June 2000, The Association of State Green Parties (ASGP) organized the national nominating convention that took place in Denver, Colorado, at which Green Party delegates nominated Ralph Nader and Winona LaDuke to be their party's candidates for president and vice president.

On July 9, the Vermont Progressive Party nominated Nader, giving him ballot access in the state. On August 12, the United Citizens Party of South Carolina chose Ralph Nader as its presidential nominee, giving him a ballot line in the state.

In October 2000, at the largest Super Rally of his campaign, held in New York City's Madison Square Garden, 15,000 people paid $20 each to hear Nader speak. Nader's campaign rejected both parties as institutions dominated by corporate interests, stating that Al Gore and George W. Bush were "Tweedledee and Tweedledum". A long list of notable celebrities spoke and performed at the event including Susan Sarandon, Ani DiFranco, Ben Harper, Tim Robbins, Michael Moore, Eddie Vedder and Patti Smith. The campaign also had some prominent union help: The California Nurses Association and the United Electrical Workers endorsed his candidacy and campaigned for him.

Nader and LaDuke received 2,883,105 votes, for 2.74 percent of the popular vote (third place overall), missing the 5 percent needed to qualify the Green Party for federally distributed public funding in the next election, yet qualifying the party for ballot status in many states.

Nader often openly expressed his hope for Bush's victory over Gore, saying it "would mobilize us", and that environmental and consumer regulatory agencies would fare better under Bush than Gore. When asked which of the two he would vote for if forced, Nader answered: "Bush ... If you want the parties to diverge from one another, have Bush win." As to whether he would feel regret if he caused Gore's defeat, Nader replied: "I would not—not at all. I'd rather have a provocateur than an anesthetizer in the White House." On another occasion, Nader answered this question with: "No, not at all ... There may be a cold shower for four years that would help the Democratic Party ... It doesn't matter who is in the White House."

===== Spoiler controversy =====
In the 2000 presidential election in Florida, George W. Bush defeated Al Gore by 537 votes. Nader received 97,421 votes, which led to claims that he was responsible for Gore's defeat. Nader disputes that he helped Bush win. A 2003 study found that Nader's candidacy was a critical factor in Bush's victory. A 2004 study found that Nader voters had the profile of likely voters with a preference for Democratic candidates. They were therefore likely to vote for Gore over Bush in the absence of Nader's candidacy.

A study by Harvard Professor B. C. Burden in 2005 claimed Nader did not employ a spoiler strategy, but still "play a pivotal role in determining who would become president following the 2000 election", saying:

Contrary to Democrats' complaints, Nader was not intentionally trying to throw the election. A spoiler strategy would have caused him to focus disproportionately on the most competitive states and markets with the hopes of being a key player in the outcome. There is no evidence that his appearances responded to closeness. He did, apparently, pursue voter support, however, in a quest to receive 5% of the popular vote.

However, Jonathan Chait of The American Prospect and The New Republic notes that Nader did indeed focus on swing states disproportionately during the waning days of the campaign, and by doing so jeopardized his own chances of achieving the 5% of the vote he was aiming for.

Then there was the debate within the Nader campaign over where to travel in the waning days of the campaign. Some Nader advisers urged him to spend his time in uncontested states such as New York and California. These states – where liberals and leftists could entertain the thought of voting Nader without fear of aiding Bush – offered the richest harvest of potential votes. But, Martin writes, Nader – who emerges from this account as the house radical of his own campaign – insisted on spending the final days of the campaign on a whirlwind tour of battleground states such as Pennsylvania and Florida. In other words, he chose to go where the votes were scarcest, jeopardizing his own chances of winning 5 percent of the vote, which he needed to gain federal funds in 2004.

When Nader, in a letter to environmentalists, attacked Gore for "his role as broker of environmental voters for corporate cash", and "the prototype for the bankable, Green corporate politician", and what he called a string of broken promises to the environmental movement, Sierra Club president Carl Pope sent an open letter to Nader, dated October 27, 2000, defending Al Gore's environmental record and calling Nader's strategy "irresponsible". He wrote:

You have also broken your word to your followers who signed the petitions that got you on the ballot in many states. You pledged you would not campaign as a spoiler and would avoid the swing states. Your recent campaign rhetoric and campaign schedule make it clear that you have broken this pledge ... Please accept that I, and the overwhelming majority of the environmental movement in this country, genuinely believe that your strategy is flawed, dangerous and reckless.

==== 2004 ====
Nader speaking on environmentalism in February 2004

Nader announced on December 23, 2003, that he would not seek the Green Party's nomination for president in 2004, but did not rule out running as an independent candidate.

Ralph Nader and Democratic candidate John Kerry held a widely publicized meeting early in the 2004 presidential campaign. Nader said that John Kerry wanted to work to win Nader's support and the support of Nader's voters, prompting Nader to provide Kerry more than 20 pages of issues that he felt were important. According to Nader, he asked John Kerry to choose any three of the issues and highlight them in his campaign; should Kerry meet these conditions Nader would not contest the election. On February 22, 2004, having not heard back from Kerry, Nader announced that he would run for president as an independent.

Due to concerns about a possible spoiler effect, many Democrats urged Nader to abandon his 2004 candidacy. The chairman of the Democratic National Committee, Terry McAuliffe, stated that Nader had a "distinguished career, fighting for working families", and that McAuliffe "would hate to see part of his legacy being that he got us eight years of George Bush". Theresa Amato, Nader's national campaign manager in 2000 and 2004, later alleged that McAuliffe offered to pay off Nader if he would not campaign in certain states, an allegation confirmed by Nader and undisputed by McAuliffe.

Nader received 463,655 votes, for 0.38 percent of the popular vote, placing him in third place overall.

==== 2008 ====
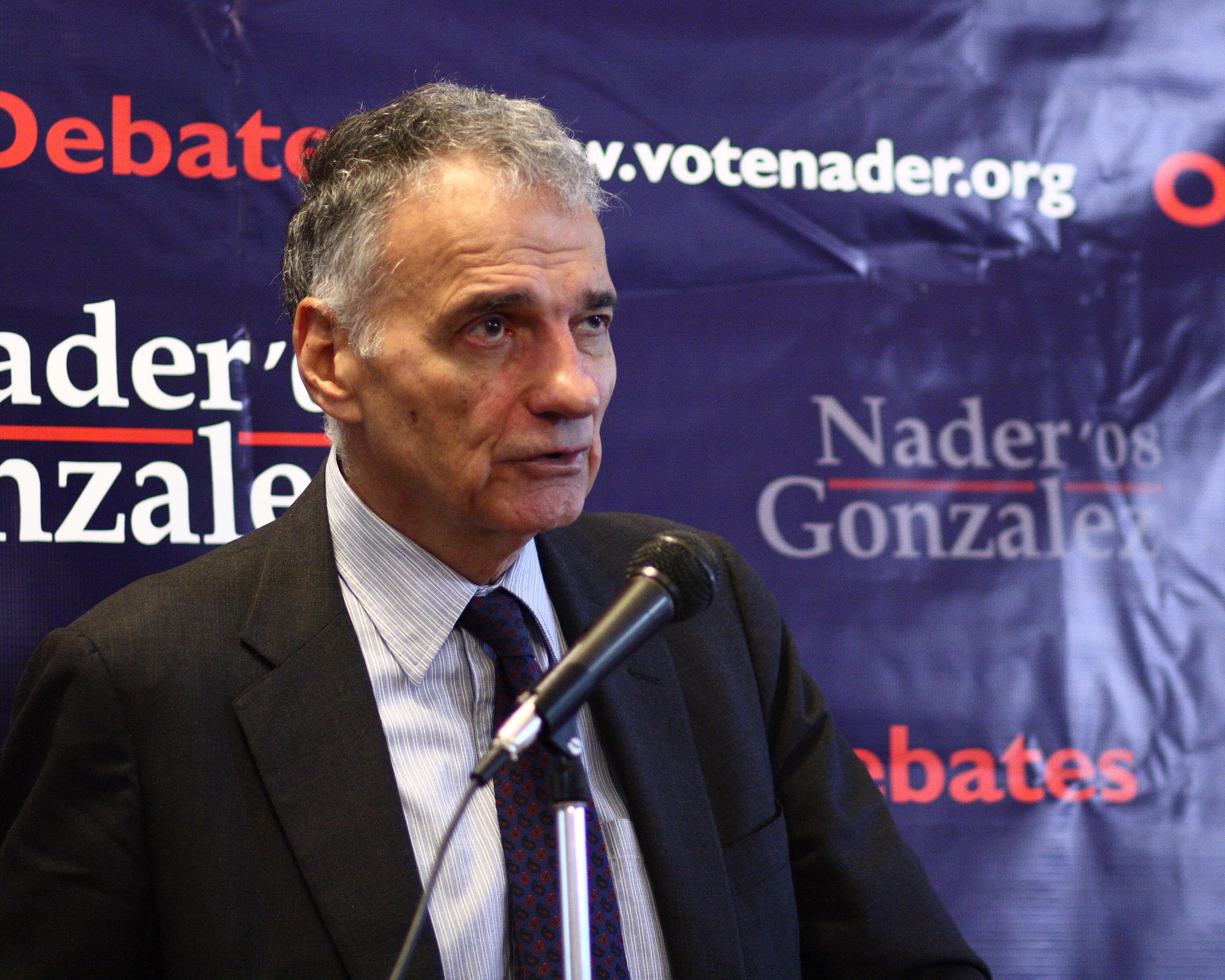
Nader campaigning in October 2008

In February 2007, Nader criticized Democratic front-runner Hillary Clinton as "a panderer and a flatterer", later describing her as someone who had "no political fortitude". During a February 2008 appearance on Meet the Press, Nader announced his intention to run for president as an independent, later naming Matt Gonzalez as his running-mate. Nader was endorsed by Howard Zinn, Jesse Ventura, Justin Jeffre, Tom Morello, Val Kilmer, Rocky Anderson, James Abourezk, Patti Smith, and Jello Biafra. The Nader campaign raised $4.3 million in campaign funds, primarily from small, individual donations. Nader/Gonzalez earned 738,475 votes and a third-place finish in the 2008 United States presidential election.

Campaign	Running mate	Ballot access	Funds raised	Popular vote	Party affiliation Co-nominators	Media and organizational endorsers	Notable endorsers
2000	Winona LaDuke		$8.4 million	2,882,995 (2.74%)	Green Party USA Vermont Progressive Party	California Nurses Association; United Electrical Workers; Hemp Industries Association; Village Voice; The Austin Chronicle; Worcester Magazine; San Francisco Bay Guardian	Susan Sarandon, Michael Moore, Howard Zinn, Eddie Vedder, Bill Murray, Pete Seeger, Linda Ronstadt, Paul Newman, Willie Nelson, Noam Chomsky, John B. Anderson, Phil Donahue
2004	Peter Camejo		$4.6 million	463,655 (0.38%)	unaffiliated Reform Party USA; Independence Party of New York; Independent Party of Delaware		David Brower, Patti Smith, Noam Chomsky, Howard Zinn, Phil Donahue
2008	Matt Gonzalez		$4.3 million	738,475 (0.56%)	unaffiliated Independent Party of Delaware; Ecology Party of Florida; Natural Law Party; Peace and Freedom Party; Socialist Alternative		Howard Zinn, Jesse Ventura, Justin Jeffre, Tom Morello, Val Kilmer, Rocky Anderson, James Abourezk, Patti Smith, Jello Biafra, Chris Hedges, Phil Donahue, Cindy Sheehan, Sean Penn

=== Congressional Accountability Project ===
Nader founded the Congressional Accountability Project to "oppose corruption in the U. S. Congress".

=== Later activities ===
Nader condemned the 2011 military intervention in Libya. He branded President Barack Obama as a "war criminal" and called for his impeachment.

In June 2019, Nader, who lost his 24-year-old grandniece in the Ethiopian Airlines crash, claimed that the Boeing 737 Max "must never fly again... it's not a matter of software. It's a matter of structural design defect: the plane's engines are too much for the traditional fuselage". Nader also called for Boeing top leaders to resign and said that the Federal Aviation Administration "has been in the pockets of the Boeing company for years".

==== D.C. Library Renaissance Project ====
In 2002, Nader founded the D.C. Library Renaissance Project, which has sought to halt the development of the West End Library in Washington, D.C., alleging that it "violated affordable housing guidelines, undervalued the land, and didn't conform to the city's Comprehensive Plan". The legal obstacles presented by the Library Renaissance Project have cost the D.C. government over one million dollars in legal fees. Nader has opposed the privatized development of D.C. libraries despite community support, citing a lack of oversight and competitive bidding process.

==== Only the Super Rich Can Save Us ====
In 2009, Nader published his first work of fiction, Only the Super-Rich Can Save Us!. Many of the characters were fictionalized versions of real-life persons including Ted Turner and Warren Buffett. The book's principal villain, a "conservative evil genius" named Brovar Dortwist, represents Grover Norquist. According to Norquist, Nader had called him prior to the book's publication and said he "wouldn't be too unhappy, because the character was principled".

The novel met with mixed reviews with The Wall Street Journal noting that the book "reads less like a novel ... than a dream journal" with a plot that victoriously concludes with "American society thoroughly Naderized", though The Globe and Mail called it "a powerful idea by the perfect person at a fortuitous time".

Nader also branched out into fiction with the fable collection Animal Envy in 2016.

==== 2012 debate moderator ====
During the 2012 United States presidential election, Nader moderated a debate for third-party candidates at Washington, D.C.'s Busboys and Poets. The debate was attended by Green Party presidential candidate Jill Stein, Libertarian Gary Johnson, Rocky Anderson of the Justice Party and Constitution Party candidate Virgil Goode. He later moderated a similar debate in a studio appearance broadcast by Russia Today.

==== Ralph Nader Radio Hour ====
Since March 2014, Nader has co-hosted the weekly Ralph Nader Radio Hour, produced at KPFK-FM in Los Angeles and distributed via the Pacifica Radio Network. The program features "interviews with some of the nation's most influential movers and shakers" and discussion of current events. Nader's co-hosts are Steve Skrovan and David Feldman.

==== American Museum of Tort Law ====
In 2015, after a decade planning, Nader founded the American Museum of Tort Law in Winsted, Connecticut. The opening ceremonies were emceed by Phil Donahue. Nader personally donated $150,000 to the establishment of the museum, which was sited on two parcels of land rezoned by the town of Winsted to host it. At the time of its opening, some expressed skepticism that a museum dedicated to tort would have much interest to the general public, though Nader responded that he was "astounded how a country can go over 200 years and not have a law museum".

==== Campaign for Harvard admissions reform ====
Nader unsuccessfully sought a seat on the Harvard University Board of Overseers in 2016 as part of an insurgent candidate slate operating under the name "Free Harvard, Fair Harvard" which called for increased transparency by the university as to how it made athletic and legacy admissions decisions. In February of that year, while noting that he would not vote for him personally, he expressed support for Donald Trump making a third-party run for president, saying that such a move might help break-up the two party system.

==== Newspapers ====
Following the closure of The Winsted Journal in 2017, Nader provided the first funds for The Winsted Phoenix in 2018 and then pulled backing. The newspaper folded in 2021. A year later, Nader announced he was financially backing the creation of another newspaper in his hometown called the Winsted Citizen and provided $15,000 for the first monthly issue printed February 2023.

A month later it was reported Nader failed to provide funding as initially promised for the paper's second edition. He had agreed to cover 75% of the cost, with the newspaper covering the rest. However, the money had not been delivered by the time of the second edition's printing. Instead, at that time Nader offered to give a $8,000 loan, which the newspaper declined to accept.

In April 2022, Nader founded the print newspaper Capitol Hill Citizen. According to Politico, the publication's coverage centers on issues important to Nader, such as the growth of corporate influence on the federal government, corruption among lawmakers and the follies and failures of the mainstream political media.

== Personal life ==
Nader, whose family was Antiochian Greek Orthodox Christian, recalled that during his childhood his family had been "embraced" by a Methodist church where he attended Sunday school. In addition to English, Nader also speaks Spanish, Russian, Portuguese, Chinese, and conversational Arabic.

Nader defines his ideology not as left-wing or right-wing but as a "moral empiricist". He has lived in Washington D.C. since the 1960s, but is domiciled in Connecticut, where he is registered to vote. Nader has expressed admiration for Robert La Follette, Eugene Debs, and Edmund Burke.

His siblings are Laura (a professor of social and cultural anthropology at U.C. Berkeley), Claire, and late brother Shafeek. After his older brother Shafeek died of prostate cancer in 1986, Nader developed Bell's palsy, which paralyzed the left side of his mouth for several months. He commented on his partial facial paralysis to audiences during this time with the quip that "at least my opponents can't say I'm talking out of both sides of my mouth". Nader's grandniece Samya Stumo was among the 157 people killed in the crash of Ethiopian Airlines Flight 302 in March 2019.

Nader is a lifelong fan of the New York Yankees.

=== Personality and character traits ===
Rupert Cornwell of The Independent described Nader as an "ascetic ... bordering on self-righteous". Despite access to respectable financial assets, he lives in a modest apartment and spends $25,000 annually on personal bills, conducting most of his writing on a typewriter. According to popular accounts of his personal life, he does not own a television, relies primarily on public transportation, and over a 25-year period, until 1983, exclusively wore one of a dozen pairs of shoes he had purchased at a clearance sale in 1959. His suits, which he reports he purchases at sales and outlet stores, have been the repeated subject of public scrutiny, being variously described as "wrinkled", "rumpled", and "styleless". A newspaper story once described Nader as a "conscientious objector to fashion".

Nader has never married. Karen Croft, a writer who worked for Nader in the late 1970s at the Center for Study of Responsive Law, once asked him if he had ever considered marriage, to which he responded that he had made a choice to dedicate his life to career rather than family.

=== Finances ===
According to the mandatory fiscal disclosure report that he filed with the Federal Election Commission in 2000, Nader owned more than $3 million worth of stocks and mutual fund shares; his single largest holding was more than $1 million worth of stock in Cisco Systems, Inc. He also held between $100,000 and $250,000 worth of shares in the Magellan Fund. Nader said he owned no car and owned no real estate directly in 2000, and said that he lived on $25,000 a year, giving most of his stock earnings to many of the over four dozen non-profit organizations he had founded.

Nader owns shares in Amazon and believes the corporation should be paying shareholders a dividend. He also believes that there should be an "antitrust investigation" looking into the company's business practices.

Nader is also an Apple Inc. shareholder. In 2018, he wrote an open letter to Tim Cook criticizing Apple's $100 billion share buyback.

== Media appearances ==
=== Film ===
In the 2005 Jim Carrey film Fun with Dick and Jane, Nader makes a cameo appearance as himself.

The Steve Skrovan documentary film An Unreasonable Man is about the life of Ralph Nader and uses both archival footage and original interviews. It debuted at the Sundance Film Festival in 2006.

=== Periodicals ===
Nader was featured on the cover of the January 22, 1968, issue of Newsweek; the December 12, 1969, issue of Time; the June 1971 issue of Esquire; and the August 2016 issue of Pacific Standard.

=== Television ===
Nader has been a guest on multiple episodes of Saturday Night Live, Real Time with Bill Maher, The Daily Show, The O'Reilly Factor, Meet the Press, Democracy Now!, and The Late Show with David Letterman. In 2003 he appeared on Da Ali G Show and, in 2008, was interviewed by Triumph the Insult Comic Dog on Late Night with Conan O'Brien.

In 1988, Nader appeared on Sesame Street as "a person in your neighborhood", the episode also featuring Barbara Walters and Martina Navratilova. Nader's appearance on the show was memorable because it was the only time that the grammar of the last line of the song – "a person that you meet each day" – was questioned and changed. Nader refused to sing a line which he deemed grammatically improper, so a compromise was reached by which Nader sang the last line solo, with the modified words: "a person whom you meet each day".

== Recognition ==
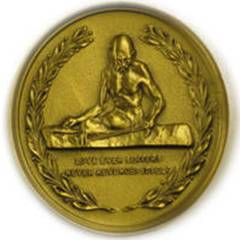
Nader was the 2016 recipient of the Gandhi Peace Award.

- In 1967, Nader was named one of the "Ten Outstanding Young Men of the Year" by the United States Junior Chamber.
- In 1990, Nader was listed one of the "100 Most Influential Americans of the 20th century by Life magazine.
- In 1999, Time magazine named Nader one of the "100 Most Influential Americans of the 20th Century".
- In 1999, a New York University panel of journalists ranked Unsafe at Any Speed 38th among the top 100 pieces of journalism of the 20th century.
- In 2006, Nader was named one of the "100 Most Influential Americans" by The Atlantic.
- In 2008, Nader was listed among the "100 Most Influential Americans" in the Britannica Guide to 100 Most Influential Americans.
- In 2016, Nader was inducted into the Automotive Hall of Fame.
- In 2016, Nader received that year's Gandhi Peace Award from Promoting Enduring Peace.

== Electoral history ==
1996 United States presidential election
Party	Candidate	Votes	%
	Bill Clinton/Al Gore	47,401,185	49.2%
	Bob Dole/Jack Kemp	39,197,469	40.7%
	Ross Perot/Pat Choate	8,085,294	8.4%
	Ralph Nader/Winona LaDuke	685,297	0.7%

2000 United States presidential election
Party	Candidate	Votes	%
	George W. Bush/Dick Cheney	50,456,002	47.9%
	Al Gore/Joe Lieberman	50,999,897	48.4%
	Ralph Nader/Winona LaDuke	2,882,955	2.7%

2004 United States presidential election
Party	Candidate	Votes	%
	George W. Bush/Dick Cheney	62,040,610	50.7%
	John Kerry/John Edwards	59,028,444	48.3%
	Ralph Nader/Peter Camejo	465,151	0.4%

2008 United States presidential election
Party	Candidate	Votes	%
	Barack Obama/Joe Biden	69,498,516	52.9%
	John McCain/Sarah Palin	59,948,323	45.7%
	Ralph Nader/Matt Gonzalez	739,034	0.6%

== See also ==
- The Case Against Free Trade
- Corporate welfare, a term coined by Nader
- List of Lebanese Americans

Party political offices
First	Green nominee for President of the United States; 1996, 2000	Succeeded by David Cobb
Preceded by Pat Buchanan	Reform nominee for President of the United States; 2004	Succeeded by Ted Weill
Preceded by Leonard Peltier	Peace and Freedom nominee for President of the United States; 2008	Succeeded by Roseanne Barr
