= Robert Fellmeth =

American academic

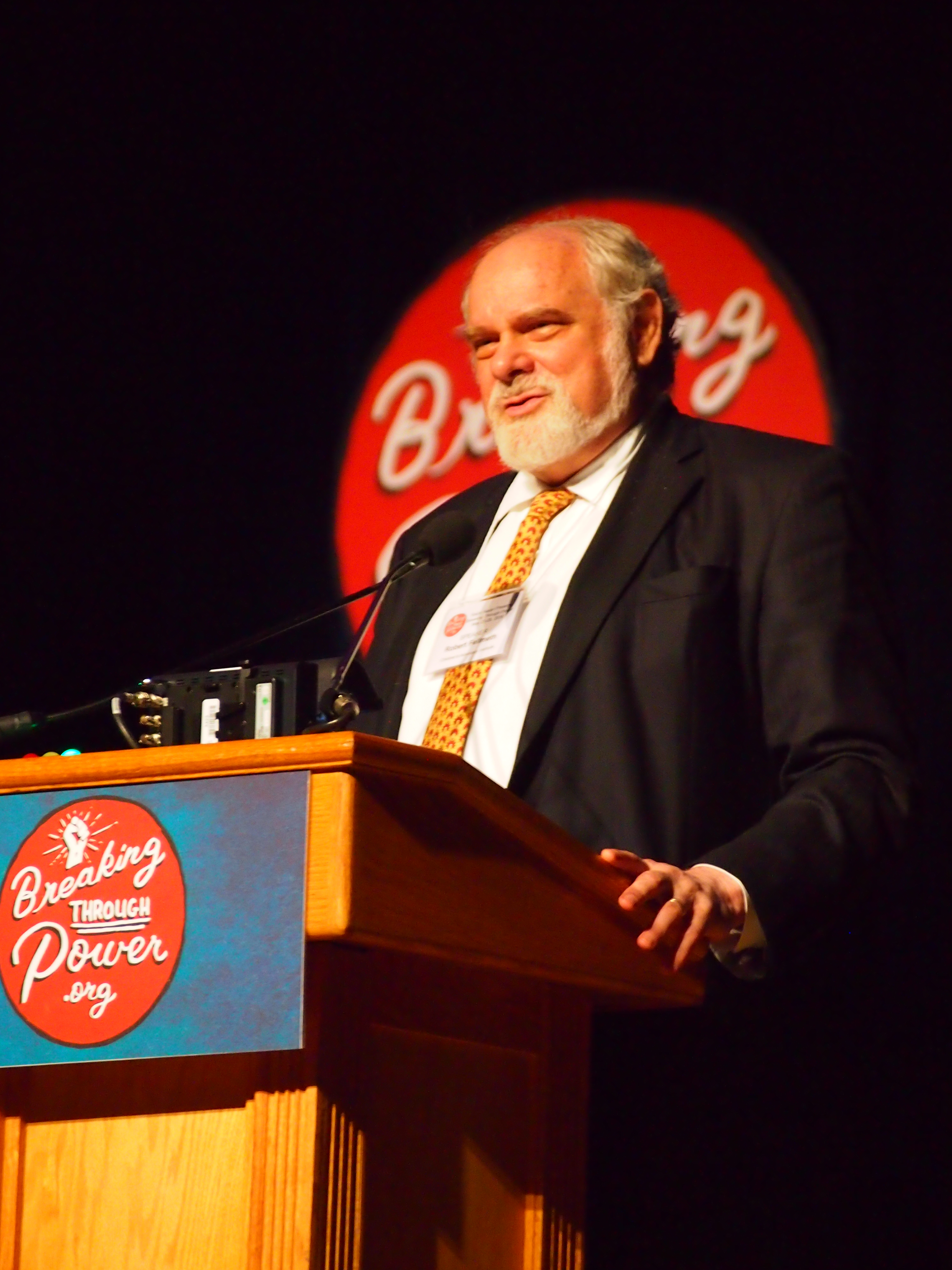
- Born: September 21, 1945 (age 81)
- Education: Stanford University, Harvard University
- Occupation: Lawyer
- Notable work: The Nader Report on the Federal Trade Commission.

Robert ("Bob") Fellmeth is an American lawyer. He is a tenured Professor of Law at the University of San Diego School of Law, holder of the Price Chair in Public Interest Law, and executive director of the Center for Public Interest Law and the Children's Advocacy Institute.

== Education ==
Fellmeth attended Kailua High School on Oahu in the state of Hawaii. He was elected its student body president in 1962 and graduated in 1963. Fellmeth then graduated with an AB cum laude from Stanford University in 1967 and with a JD from Harvard University in 1970. While at Harvard, Fellmeth chaired the law school's Civil Rights – Civil Liberties Research Committee and worked on the initial issues of the Harvard Civil Rights-Civil Liberties Law Review.

== Initial consumer advocacy ==
While at Harvard Law School, Fellmeth became one of the original "Nader's Raiders," working as part of the consumer movement of the 1960s and '70s with consumer advocate Ralph Nader. He was one of the initial 7 law students investigating the Federal Trade Commission in 1968, and was one of three co-authors of The Nader Report on the Federal Trade Commission. After its publication, he organized what was then called "Nader's Raiders" in the summer of 1969, raising funds and recruiting researchers divided into 5 groups examining the performance of the FDA, Department of Agriculture, air pollution and water pollution control and the transportation regulation of the Interstate Commerce Commission (ICC), respectively. Resulting books included The Chemical Feast, Vanishing Air, Water Wasteland, Sewing the Wind, and the Interstate Commerce Omission. He supervised the ICC project of seven law students, resulting in a jointly authored book, The Interstate Commerce Omission (Grossman, 1969). During this period, Life Magazine featured these researchers in an article entitled "The Lone Ranger Gets a Posse" that pictured the students, Fellmeth, and the team directors standing behind Nader on the Capitol steps.

Fellmeth remained with Nader after graduation from the Harvard Law School in 1970. He then directed a study of land use policy in California, under the aegis of Nader's Center for Study of Responsive Law, producing a report and then the book: The Politics of Land (Grossman, 1970). From 1971 to 1973, he directed the Nader Congress Project as part of that Center. The Project produced 30- to 50-page profiles of every incumbent member of Congress, written by young journalists and journalism students, with support from volunteer researchers in the state capitols and Congressional districts. The profiles included demographics about districts, campaign finance details and campaign promises, and included early revelation of committee votes of members (previously not easily available publicly). Many of the profiles were published in summary form in newspapers in the relevant Congressional districts just prior to the 1972 elections. The profile writing part of the Congress Project was overseen by Joan Claybrook, later director of the National Highway Traffic Safety Administration and later president of the national consumer and public interest organization: Public Citizen.

The Project also published five books about the major committees of the Congress, with Fellmeth contributing to The Commerce Committees book edited by Project Director David Price, later a member of Congress. The Project also produced the best seller Who Runs Congress. Fellmeth wrote the preface as project director, with the book's authorship divided among David Zwick, James Fallows, and Mark Green. Fellmeth's work related to the early consumer movement in the 1970s, including the Federal Trade Commission (the FTC Improvements Act) and the deregulation of trucking (the Surface Transportation Deregulation Act). He was one of the first consumer advocates to embrace restoration of free market forces – and at times was identified as the "conservative" within the movement. He and the other "Raiders" are associated with the consumer safety and environmental statutes of this period. Fellmeth is featured in the biographies of Nader and the early years of the consumer movement, including the documentary An Unreasonable Man.

== White collar crime prosecutor: 1973–1981 ==
Fellmeth left the Nader organization after the Congress Project in 1973. That same year, he began service as a public prosecutor in San Diego County, enforcing state law as a deputy district attorney until 1981, specializing in white collar crime. In 1974, he started the nation's first dedicated local prosecution unit enforcing antitrust and unfair competition statutes. For the next seven years, he filed related cases. From 1979 to 1981, he was cross commissioned as an Assistant United States Attorney – a status that allows the filing of criminal or civil cases in either the state or federal jurisdiction. Over this period, he prosecuted 22 antitrust and unfair competition cases. Those reported (with published appellate decisions) included People v. Mobile Magic and People v. National Association of Realtors, with a resulting judgment of liability for per se unlawful tie-in and price fixing offenses against the national, state and local realtor trade associations.

During this period, Fellmeth taught antitrust and unfair competition subject areas at the College of the National Association of District Attorneys, and at the National Judicial College (the training facility in Reno, Nevada created by the U.S. Supreme Court for the training of federal and state court judges).

He also worked with the California District Attorneys' Association to rewrite the unfair competition laws of California. Four amendments were introduced by then state legislator Alan Sieroty, which moved the statute from Civil Code Section 3369 and expanded it into its present form in Ca. Bus. & Profs. Code Section 17200 et seq. In later years, he enforced the statute, first as a prosecutor, and then as private civil counsel, and over the last twenty years as a public interest advocate through the Center for Public Interest Law.

After 1993, he became concerned about plaintiff attorney abuses of the Unfair Competition Law he had been instrumental in drafting. He recommended reforms to require some of the due process elements of class action law to prevent multiple or spurious lawsuits for the same alleged offense. The state legislature appointed him as special consultant to its own "Law Revision Commission" from 1995 to 1998 to consider reforms. His proposals included a requirement that the person bringing the action for the "general public" qualify as a typical victim and must "adequately represent" the public (e.g., have no inappropriate relationship with the attorneys involved and no conflicts of interest), that proper notice be given to the public through the offices of the Attorney General and proper publication for "opt out" opportunity, and that a court review all cases and settlements for due process compliance and fairness. These measures, Fellmeth argued in his final report, would limit abuses, and confer proper finality to cases. However, his reforms were opposed by both the insurance industry and the trial lawyers and the legislature rejected them as addressing non-existent problems. Three years later, the Trevor Law Group in Beverly Hills and several other firms began to commit widespread abuses as he had predicted. That is, law firms brought hundreds of pro forma actions, particularly against car repair firms, nail salons and restaurants, for technical violations and demanding payment, with no finality or res judicata that would prevent another suit for the same alleged wrongs, and without judicial review of attorneys' fees demanded and paid. The State Bar responded with disciplinary action against the lawyers involved, and Fellmeth was retained as one of the Bar's "expert witnesses" in these prosecutions—which eventually disbarred most of the offending attorneys.

However, the abuses also mobilized industry to limit California's Unfair Competition Law. They proposed Proposition 64 in 2004, which went well beyond the changes urged by Fellmeth, and imposed restrictions that he opposed. The measure passed by a 59% to 41% margin and included full class action requirements beyond those recommended by Fellmeth, and over his stated opposition in op eds at the time. The proposition removed from unfair competition coverage of any case not involving direct financial loss. Hence, health, safety, privacy and environmental offenses no longer were included within the statute's ambit.

== California Athletic Commission ==
During the 1976 to 1981 period, Fellmeth was appointed by the governor to the State Athletic Commission, then a five-member body regulating boxing and wrestling, et al. Fellmeth was selected to chair the commission for 3 of his 5 years by other commissioners. He drafted the first pension plan for boxers and sponsored its legislative enactment in 1980 (Bus. & Profs. Section 18880 et seq.) It currently covers approximately 500 boxers, those who fought enough rounds over four or more years to "vest." It also includes disability benefits. Through the Center for Public Interest Law (CPIL), Fellmeth has periodically defended the pension plan from promoter opposition and attempts to eliminate it. In recent years, CPIL supported legislation that has liberalized it to allow early benefits for non-boxing employment vocational training. Fellmeth has advocated for adoption of similar pension plans nationally and in other major states (Nevada, New Jersey, New York). However, those efforts have not been successful, and the California system remains the only pension system in place for professional boxers.

Fellmeth also proposed and won enactment of deregulation reforms applicable to boxing regulation, removing theatrical professional wrestling from regulation and reducing the number of persons requiring licensure (such as ushers, ticket takers, ticket printers) that he argued impeded promoter competition.

== Teaching and the Center for Public Interest Law ==
In 1978, Fellmeth began to teach antitrust and consumer law at the University of San Diego School of Law part-time, while still serving as a prosecutor. He moved over full-time to teaching in 1982 and won tenure as a full professor at the school in 1984. Soon thereafter, he was appointed to hold the "Price Chair in Public Interest Law" one of several such chairs nationally. He has taught consumer law, antitrust law, trade regulation, intellectual property, and criminal process. For the last twenty years, his focus has been two courses: Public Interest Law and Practice and Child Rights and Remedies.

=== Center for Public Interest Law establishment and purpose ===
Fellmeth started the Center for Public Interest Law (CPIL) in 1980, training law students in public interest practice. The "Public Interest Law and Practice" course noted above is a part of the CPIL program and includes a clinic component. The course uses state agencies as the forum for teaching public interest law. The regulatory forum was selected because of the strong domination of the associations of trades/professions regulated by each of them, respectively), their broad authority and general enabling statutes. Covered agencies include the Public Utilities Commission, the State Bar, the Accountancy Board, the Medical Board, the Department of Managed Health Care, Cal-OSHA, the Insurance Commissioner, the Department of Real Estate and 20 other agencies.

During its first decade of the 1980s, CPIL brought suit in Le Dao v. Board of Medical Quality Assurance to allow the licensure of more than 25 Vietnamese doctors who had allegedly been unfairly denied the right to practice after attending an AMA certified medical school, escaping Vietnam as "boat people", passing all of California's examinations and performing as interns in hospitals. The filed case became irrelevant when the Legislature enacted CPIL sponsored legislation effectively mandating licensure. Other litigation during the early years concerned the state's Open Meetings and Public Records Acts.

Legislation has included strengthening amendments to the Public Records Act and to the Administrative Procedure Act. One consistent theme of concerns "muzzle clauses" prohibiting any report by the plaintiff to the licensing agency of the defendant about the alleged wrongful acts or damage resulting. Fellmeth argues that such clauses benefit the offender, and the plaintiff's counsel is essentially compelled to accept them because of the settlement funds at issue to be received by the client. CPIL had been successful in prohibiting such clauses as to attorney malpractice suits, and more recently has won enactment of a statute to prohibit them as to all of trades and professions regulated under the Department of Consumer Affairs. However, they are not comprehensively banned.

CPIL objects to the system of five separate proceedings to decide discipline of licensed professionals: (a) a hearing before an administrative law judge that leads to a "proposed decision" to (b) a board or agency head, who then makes a decision without judicial background, and without having seen the witnesses. It then goes (c) to superior court for retrial on an "independent judgment" basis, and then (d) to the court of appeal and (e) to petition to the state Supreme Court. CPIL documents argue that these five steps are two more than exist for criminal prosecutions, and the delay is commonly above 5 years where fully pursued. CPIL advocates for fewer steps, each purportedly of higher quality. The first would be a full trial before an administrative law judge, preferably with knowledge of the subject area, followed by a single step judicial review.

The CPIL reforms have been partially enacted as to enforcement by the Medical Board, and are more fully reflected in the State Bar's system fashioned largely by Fellmeth and Bar presidents in the late 1980s (see discussion below of Fellmeth's State Bar Discipline Monitor position). Fellmeth's theory of regulation, including advocacy of presumptive reliance on market forces, with an analysis of market flaws that warrant intervention and a preferable ordering of those options, is in his early article: A Theory of Regulation: A Platform for State Regulatory Reform.

=== Evolution of CPIL, current status ===
In 1985, Elizabeth (Mulroy) Mohr, who had been serving as deputy director of CPIL and editor of its California Regulatory Law Reporter, moved to San Francisco and took a position as counsel within the California Department of Insurance – a post she still holds. A search was conducted among former USD students to replace her. One of the candidates was Julianne D'Angelo, a graduate of the school and one of its top students – the editor-in-chief of its Law Review. Following her graduation in 1982 from USD School of Law, Ms. D'Angelo clerked for a federal district court judge in Phoenix and then worked for the Department of Justice in Washington, D.C. She was among those recruited to the University of San Diego post in 1985 and returned to the school to fill it. By 1986, she served as both editor of the California Regulatory Law Reporter and the administrative director of the Center for Public Interest Law. Meanwhile, in 1989 Fellmeth moved over into the child advocacy subject area with the Children's Advocacy Institute. In 1995, while both were in their forties, Julie D'Angelo and Robert Fellmeth married.

Fellmeth, as the holder of the Price Chair in Public Interest Law, serves as executive director of CPIL. During that period, CPIL has participated in consumer advocacy, particularly before the PUC, the State Bar, the Accountancy Board, the Department of Insurance, the Medical Board, the Contractors State Licensing Board. She helped draft and CPIL co-sponsored the state legislation to implement the Sarbanes - Oxley accounting reforms—with the California version allegedly a stronger regulatory version. CPIL has opposed policies advocated by the Big Three Accounting firms. One example is the Bonnie Moore case. CPIL contended that the Accountancy Board, allegedly dominated by practicing CPAs, attempted to prohibit the use of the word "accountant" for use by anyone other than themselves through a Board rule. The court restrained the board from allowing its segment of practitioners to exclusively capture the term – which CPIL and others contended has a broader meaning.

CPIL has also been active in the monitoring of agencies under the authority of the state legislature. CPIL served as the staff of the Contractor's State Licensing Board (CSLB) Enforcement Monitor. That appointed monitor, Tom Papageorge, is a longstanding federal and state white collar crime prosecutor. The CSLB project led to legislation to alter its enforcement system, including consumer protections in representations and contractor bonds.

CPIL's Professor Julie Fellmeth was herself appointed as the Medical Board Enforcement Monitor pursuant to legislation authorizing a multi-year investigation relevant to competent physician practice and patient safety. Her reports resulted in legislation altering physician discipline, as discussed above.

CPIL advocacy resulted in some legislation demarking medical regulation from most other trades and professions. Instead of a generic group of "consumer investigators" within the Department of Consumer Affairs, the Medical Board has specialized investigators. Similarly, the Office of Attorney General now has a dedicated medical quality unit that prosecutes these cases. And the Office of Administrative Hearings, providing the Administrative Law Judges (ALJs) that try the cases, also now has a distinct group that conducts the trials, allowing a smaller group of judges to experience many cases in this subject area, rather than spreading the cases across ALJs that handle alcohol, financial, real estate and many other areas of regulation. CPIL sponsored legislation creating those changes (SB 2375 (Presley) in 1990 and SB 916 (Presley) in 1993). The Medical Board cases may now be brought within three steps instead of four to five. Traditionally and as to most agencies, after the ALJ hearing, the proposed decision is still reviewed de novo by the Medical Board (which has no judicial expertise and did not view the testimony – a step CPIL opposes) and then moves to independent judgment review by a superior court, automatic right of appeal to the court of appeal, and discretionary Supreme Court review. In the case of the Medical Board, CPIL won a change that makes the appellate court review by petition (and therefore discretionary). CPIL argued that the difference here is that a third level of appeal "of right" means even spurious appeals can delay final decision for years. So the Medical Board system has somewhat fewer proceedings and with some enhanced expertise by the officials involved. In addition to general process, CPIL has directed substantial advocacy to the problem of alcohol and drug abuse among professionals, including doctors, nurses and other health professionals, and attorneys. As Medical Board Enforcement Monitor, Professor D'Angelo Fellmeth audited the "diversion" program of the Medical Board—allowing those accused of incompetence or other dangerous practice to delay or mitigate their discipline through substance abuse programs. She also found a great deal of "gaming" of the system. Her conclusions repeated similar findings of two prior audits by the Office of the State Auditor. Another audit after her report again repeated the same critique. Accordingly, the diversion program of the Medical Board was terminated by unanimous vote of the board effective in 2011. CPIL's stated position is not to oppose drug/alcohol rehabilitation, but to avoid using rigged treatment that is not policed nor achieves compliance, as a means to continue practice without adequate disciplinary protection and with resulting patient jeopardy.

=== Expert testimony, consulting, appointments and boards ===
In addition to the white collar crime consultation with public prosecutors noted above, Fellmeth has served as an expert witness in both private and public cases involving issues of consumer and antitrust law, regulatory law, children's law, and legal ethics. He has been retained by the District Attorneys of San Diego, Los Angeles and 7 other counties, the state Attorney General involved in Judicial Commission Enforcement Actions against sitting judges, the State Bars of California and Washington, and the U.S. Attorney for the Southern District.

For most of the years from 1994 to the present, Fellmeth has served on the federal "screening" committees that review applications for U.S. Attorney and federal judge positions. Appointed by Senator Barbara Boxer, he served on the bi-partisan screening committee for appointees to the Southern District of California during the Bush presidency and currently is one of 6 persons on the committee appointed by Senator Boxer for the Obama Administration. Each of California's senators has such a committee and each screens for 1/2 of the open federal positions in that district.

During the 1980s, Fellmeth served on two boards related to the work of CPIL. They include the Board of Consumers Union of the United States, the publisher of Consumer Reports, from 1981 to 1985. He then served on the Board of California Common Cause from 1986–91, acting as its Litigation Chair from 1989–91. One of his cases was an unsuccessful attempt to remove the requirement that judges seeking re-election finance their own ballot statement – at a cost approaching the annual salary for a superior court position. The Kaplan case rejected Fellmeth's argument that such a state-created expense added obligations requiring judicial campaign solicitations and violated constitutional requirements for judicial independence.

Fellmeth served as chair of the board of the Public Citizen Foundation, a public interest lobby in Washington, D.C., from 1992 to 2012, and remains on the board. Public Citizen includes divisions that focus on Congress ("Congress Watch"), the Health Research Group, Global Trade Watch, Energy Policy, a Litigation Unit, and a Texas field office. Those divisions have advocated for air bags in automobiles, transparency and ethics in government (including the recent legislation banning insider trading by the Congress), are working for a Constitutional amendment to reverse the Citizens United Supreme Court case giving corporations free speech rights to contribute to campaigns through political action committees without limitation or full disclosure. The Health Research Group published Best Pills – Worst Pills book and its FDA advocacy has led to the withdrawal of several dangerous drugs from the market. The Litigation Group specializes in U.S. Supreme Court advocacy and prepares counsel in approximately 1/3 of the cases considered by the Court.

Fellmeth has been instrumental in the creation of ancillary consumer entities. In 1983, he helped to create the Utility Consumer Action Network (UCAN) as a project of CPIL during its first three years. It sought access to the billing envelopes of the San Diego Gas and Electric Utility through an administrative action brought by CPIL before the PUC. CPIL won the case and UCAN has since become a major utility ratepayer organization. In 1988, he helped to create the Privacy Rights Clearinghouse, a national research and advocacy center on privacy rights. In 2006, he helped to organize, the Energy Policy Initiatives Center (EPIC) at the University of San Diego School of Law, and sits on its advisory board. EPIC includes law school courses in energy and environmental law, clinic placements with the PUC, Energy Commission and other agencies, and an annual environmental symposium of national experts. In 2008, EPIC sponsored the nation's first student law review on the subject of global warming.

=== State Bar Discipline Monitor position, attorney ethics and regulation ===
In 1987, Fellmeth was appointed to the newly created position of State Bar Discipline Monitor by then state attorney general John Van de Kamp. This one-time position lasted for a term of five years, reporting to the Chief Justice of the Supreme Court, and to the legislature creating it. He served for the tenure of the post, which was given discovery power to review State Bar operations, and investigated the Bar's discipline system. He issued nine reports and sponsored reform legislation or Bar rulemaking to implement many of them. His work resulted in the revamping of the State of California's attorney discipline system.

He was an outspoken critic of attorney misconduct. His frank assessment of the dishonesty employed by lawyers in civil litigation was reported in one State Bar Discipline Monitor Report: "The level of attorney dishonesty in representations to the court, in promises to clients, in dealings with adverse counsel, and perhaps especially in points and authorities and legal briefs, is embarrassing to anyone with a measure of intellectual pride. [...] Part of the problem has to do with the lack of certain sanctions for deceit. [...] It is possible to develop new rules of behavior supervening adversary representation, and restoring a measure of honor to a profession which is in a current state of well-deserved dishonor."

Some of Fellmeth's recommended State Bar reforms were enacted during the early 1990s, including the creation of an independent State Bar Court. Previously, attorneys adjudged complaints against their colleagues, with a review before an 18-member committee composed mostly of practicing attorneys. The California Supreme Court reviewed all cases and became increasingly critical of the State Bar adjudication system. The new State Bar Court recommended by Fellmeth, and supported by 4 successive State Bar presidents, removed the State Bar's jurisdiction, placing it with an independent State Bar Court of judges appointed primarily by the Supreme Court and separate from practicing attorneys. The Supreme Court approved of the change during the 1990s and issued an order allowing finality to the new Court, without required Supreme Court review of every case.

More recent State Bar advocacy by CPIL includes the substantial revision of its system of governance. For most of its history, the State Bar was governed by 23 members on its "Board of Governors." The Board included a supermajority of 17 attorneys selected by other attorneys in district elections. CPIL contended that these were often dominated by private, local trade associations. In 2011, the state legislature enacted measures long sought by CPIL that ended the control of the agency by members of the profession regulated. Accordingly the newly constituted State Bar will be controlled by a 19-member "Board of Trustees", with 6 members elected by attorneys and the remaining 13 selected by public officials, including the Supreme Court. The CPIL-sponsored legislation also subjected the State Bar to the Bagley-Keene Open Meetings Act.

=== Public interest, consumer publications ===
Fellmeth's publications in the consumer/antitrust area include 11 books and numerous academic articles (including the Theory of Regulation article discussed above, conference presentations/publications, and commentaries or newspaper op eds. These include, in addition to the three books noted above, he has written or contributed to the following public interest related books: The Politics of Land, with co/authors, Grossman, 1972; chapters in American Government, a political science text edited by Peter Woll (Little, Brown 1972) and California Administrative and Antitrust Law, w/ Professor Ralph Folsom (Butterworths, 1991). He is the co-author of the 2013 4th edition of California White Collar Crime and Business Litigation, a 700-page treatise on economic, political and other white collar offenses.

== Child advocacy and the Children's Advocacy Institute ==
Ten years after founding the Center for Public Interest Law, Fellmeth created a sister advocacy group, the Children's Advocacy Institute (CAI). After lobbying for consumers in Sacramento, he chose to focus on children's rights.

=== CAI structure ===
The Children's Advocacy Institute (CAI) is directed by an Administrative Director/Attorney; two other San Diego–based CAI attorneys are graduates of the CAI law school program. CAI also has attorneys working from its offices based in Sacramento and Washington, D.C. CAI is advised by a group of experts called the Council for Children. It includes 20 current and emeritus members. They include the former president of the American Academy of Pediatrics, the former chair of California's Medical Board and past president of the U.S. Federation of State Medical Boards, the president of San Diego's Children's Hospital, two recently serving state legislators, and leaders in child education, family law, juvenile law, public health and other disciplines.

=== Teaching and clinics ===
Since 1989, Fellmeth has focused on child advocacy. He developed a Child Rights law school course that covers issues of policy influence, court access, poverty and opportunity, education, nutrition, disability and other rights, as well as the traditional civil liberties material. His text for juvenile law, Child Rights and Remedies, is in its third edition (Clarity Press, 2002, 2006, 2011). The CAI academic program also includes clinics where students are certified by the State Bar to represent abused children in juvenile dependency court, and work on behalf of accused delinquents in juvenile delinquency court. It also include a "policy clinic" allowing students to work with the professional litigators and lobbyists of CAI in San Diego, Sacramento, and Washington D.C., where it has offices and attorney staff. As with the "public interest law" program of CPIL, which offers a "Public Interest Law" Concentration designation at graduation, students can obtain credit and graduation acknowledgment in a "Child Rights Concentration". The Child Rights Concentration combines CAI courses with the special education clinic and other courses offered by USD's School of Law and School of Education.

CAI brings test litigation, intervenes in rulemaking, and lobbies. It has sponsored various enacted bills in California since 1990, including the "Kid's Plates" (California auto license plates with a heart, plus sign, hand shape or heart) to fund child protection programs, and safety laws concerning swimming pools, kids in cars, bicycle helmets, and playgrounds. CAI has also been active in sponsoring legislation in the areas of child support collection, homeless youth, and child welfare. From 1991 to 2004 CAI published a 650-page California Children's Budget— detailing the demographic data and federal/state/local spending relevant to child poverty, nutrition, health, disability, education (k-12 and higher), protection, and delinquency. Since 1998, it has issued an annual Legislative Report Card on the performance of the State Legislature, including a score or grade for each legislator. CAI also publishes a Children's Regulatory Law Reporter, summarizing rulemaking by the major agencies affecting children (especially the Departments of Health Services, Social Services, and Education).

Since 2008, CAI has released national reports in three subject areas: (a) effective counsel for children in dependency court, (b) disclosure of information pertaining to the deaths and near deaths from child abuse, and (c) state takings from foster children (The Fleecing of Foster Children). The pattern for these studies is to issue an initial report, and then to publish an updated edition every two to three years to stay on the theme of each. The reports examine the statutes and rules of the fifty states in the subject matter, and for the first two subject areas, publish "grades" from A to F for each state's performance in protecting its children. Two such updated reports (a) and (b) above were released in 2012. A future report on new subject matter has been announced for 2013 analyzing the performance of the Department of Health and Human Services, federal courts, and Congress in assuring state compliance with constitutional and statutory floors in child protection.

Reports on the California state level have been published studying the fate of foster children emancipating into adulthood, where outcomes are problematical. CAI has been promoting a solution to the fate of emancipating foster children, called the "Transition Life Coach" (TLC) plan. CAI argues that it recognizes that the median age of self-sufficiency in the U.S. is not 21 years of age, but 26. The TLC plan creates a "trust instrument" funded at the median level of parental support for children (approximately $50,000 for self-sufficiency). The court, who has been the legal parent of the foster child would continue to have a presence in each youth's life. A trustee, called a "Transition Life Coach" (a name selected by foster kids), would provide personal mentoring and write checks under a plan developed with the youth, and monitored by the court. CAI argues that this method allows major input from the child, and is personal. The "coach" (trustee) will often be someone known to the youth, or someone trained to guide him or her, with each having no more than one or two to assist. CAI has written reports and conducted an economic study indicating that the long run consequences would involve public money savings. And CAI has succeeded in amending California law to allow these trusts to be formed by dependency court judges for any foster youth to achieve self-sufficiency without age or other limitation. Nevertheless, no county in California or any other state has to date implemented the proposal, nor has any effectuated a pilot project to date.

Future announced California reports may include (a) a study of child representation in family court, (b) a survey of the impact of AB 12 – the state law implementing the federal Fostering Connections to Success Act which can extend assistance to foster children to age 21, (c) and a study of the effects of public coverage of foster children and dependency proceedings.Children's Advocacy Institute As to the last, CAI has consistently supported presumptive transparency of public decision-making affecting foster children, with liberal allowance for protective orders and confidentiality where in the child's best interest. CAI has contended that a presumptively concealed system – typical in most states—allows child abuse harm and foster child detriment to continue without democratic check.

=== Child-related organizations ===
Fellmeth has been involved in the governance of the National Association of Counsel for Children (NACC) since 2004, serving as its Board President from 2010 to 2012. He is on the board of the First Star Foundation. He has been on the board of the National Association of Child Advocates and counsel to the board of its successor, Voices for America's Children.

Within California, Fellmeth helped in the development of the Maternal and Child Health Access Foundation of Lynn Kersey in Los Angeles starting in the 1980s that continues to provide services and advocacy for impoverished pregnant women and young children. He remains one of its board members. He is the Executive Director of the Children's Advocacy Institute.

=== Child-related publications ===
In addition to reports, articles, and conference presentation publications discussed briefly above, Fellmeth has written or contributed to a number of books in the child rights area in addition to the Child Rights and Remedies text. These include Health and Welfare for Families in the 21st Century, edited by Helen Wallace, (Jones and Bartlett, 4th edition, 2007); Expert Testimony in Child Related Litigation, (w. Dr. David Chadwick), Chapter 12 in The Forensic Pathology of Infancy and Childhood (edited by R. Byard and K. Collins, Springer Publishing, 2013); and Legal Issues, Chapter 31 in Child Maltreatment 4E: A Clinical Guide and Reference (edited by Chadwick, Giardino and Alexander, STM Learning, 2013).

== Litigation ==
Fellmeth has been counsel in 40 published appellate cases, half as counsel for a party, usually the plaintiff or petitioner challenging corporate or governmental action. The remainder represent amicus contributions at the circuit or Supreme Court level. Consumer, white collar crime and legal ethics litigation make up about 60% of all of the appellate litigation, with the remaining 40% focusing on child rights.

=== Center for Public Interest Law ===
The most recent major case of CPIL is Shames v. Hertz, an antitrust case against all 7 of the airport rental car companies operating in California, and the California Travel and Tourism Commission (CTTC), a state agency controlled by the tourism industry. The case challenged two airport rental car charges that 2006 legislation allowed the industry to "itemize" on consumer bills. The case alleges that instead of "itemizing" the charges, they were "added on" to the previous charges on every subsequent bill, effective on January 1, 2007 when the legislation took effect, with the CTTC assisting in the horizontal price fix. The case was initiated and litigated by CPIL, with three antitrust firms brought into the case. It went to the Ninth Circuit Court of Appeal on an important legal issue pertaining to legislative intent and agency liability, and which upheld the CPIL position – reversing the trial court dismissal of the CTTC from the case. The case was settled in 2013, with a court order stopping what started as a $90 million a year overcharge to consumers, awarding 250,000 consumers as much or more than the overcharge they suffered, and subjecting the CTTC to the Open Meetings Act it had allegedly violated repeatedly.

=== Children's Advocacy Institute ===
CAI's litigation includes California Foster Parents' Association v. Lightbourne, a Ninth Circuit case that found the Department of Social Services compensation to family foster care providers to be over 30% below their actual out-of-pocket costs, in violation of federal law. CAI argued that these rates were also irrational because children in homes with functioning parents have much better outcomes than do group homes with employees serving the parental role, but the latter receive more than 8 times the compensation as do families. The litigation was assisted by the pro bono efforts of Morrison and Foerster joining with the CAI legal team. The supply of family foster care providers had fallen as the compensation levels retracted due to uncompensated inflation in the years following 1998. The case required a 30% immediate increase and CPI adjustment hereafter.

CAI has two other test cases in the courts as of 2013. One challenges the 388 child caseloads of Sacramento dependency court attorneys (E.T., the other challenges the rules of the Department of Social Services (DSS) that allegedly implemented SB 39, a bill sponsored by CAI to provide for disclosure of deaths from child abuse or neglect consistent with federal and state law. The complaint contends that the rules, influenced by counties and social workers, conceals the causes of deaths contrary to the statutory intent and construction. In 2013, the Ninth Circuit upheld the dismissal of the case, invoking the equitable doctrine of "abstention," or categorical deferral to state court practice. Fellmeth has condemned the decision.

Fellmeth and CAI are also involved as counsel for objectors to the current federal case of Fraley v. Facebook.

In addition to appellate litigation by CAI and CPIL, Fellmeth has written numerous amicus briefs at the appellate level, including the brief for the National Association of Counsel for Children in the Troxel case, and for CAI on the Camreta case—both before the U.S. Supreme Court since 2006. The Camreta brief was selected as "Brief of the Week" by the National Law Journal in 2011.

== Awards ==
In 1997, Fellmeth was named "Community Champion for 30 Years of Work in Injury Prevention" by the Civil Justice Foundation. In 2009, he was honored by the university's School of Education Sciences and Leadership as a "Remarkable Leader in Education." In 2012, Fellmeth won the Thorsnes Prize for outstanding scholarship for the third edition of his text Child Rights and Remedies.
