= An Unreasonable Man =

2006 American documentary about consumer protection champion Ralph Nader

- Promotional movie poster for the film
- Directed by: Henriette Mantel; Steve Skrovan
- Produced by: Kevin O'Donnell
- Starring: Ralph Nader; Pat Buchanan; Phil Donahue; William Greider; Eric Alterman; James Ridgeway
- Cinematography: Mark Raker
- Edited by: Beth Gallagher; Alexis Provost
- Distributed by: IFC Films
- Release dates: January 24, 2006 (Sundance); January 31, 2007
- Running time: 122 minutes
- Country: United States
- Language: English

An Unreasonable Man is a 2006 documentary film that traces the life and career of political activist Ralph Nader, the founder of modern consumer protection in America and perennial presidential candidate. Contrary to the title's apparent message, the film was actually created to defend and support Nader, and to restore his reputation after his controversial role in the 2000 U.S. presidential election.

Besides featuring Mr. Nader himself, the film presents interviews with current and former members of Nader's Raiders, including Joan Claybrook and Robert Fellmeth, as well as political commentators such as Phil Donahue, Pat Buchanan, and Eric Alterman. The film takes its name from the George Bernard Shaw quotation, "The reasonable man adapts himself to the world; the unreasonable one persists in trying to adapt the world to himself. Therefore all progress depends on the unreasonable man."

== Summary ==
The first half of the film examines Nader's advocacy for auto safety features, such as federally mandated seat belts and air bags, as well as his rise to national prominence following an invasion of privacy lawsuit against General Motors. It also examines the formation of independent advocacy groups (termed "Nader's Raiders") during the 1970s; organizations which carried out independent research on various federal agencies, such as the Federal Trade Commission and the Food and Drug Administration. Over the next thirty years, the film argues, Nader "built a legislative record that would be the envy of any modern president."

The second half of the film traces Nader's shift to a grassroots form of organizing focused on citizen power, including his disillusionment with the two-party system following the rise of Reaganism. The film examines Nader's effect as a third party candidate on the results of the controversial 2000 presidential election.

== Response ==
The documentary has an aggregate of 92% based on 63 reviews on Rotten Tomatoes, with the website's critics consensus calling it "a compelling documentary that humanizes the controversial, polarizing politician", and a score of 75 percent based on 24 review on Metacritic, indicating "generally positive reviews".

== Festival screenings ==
- Meaford International Film Festival 2007
- Sundance Film Festival
