= Food & Water Watch =

American non-governmental organization

Coordinates: 38°54′33.2″N 77°2′15″W

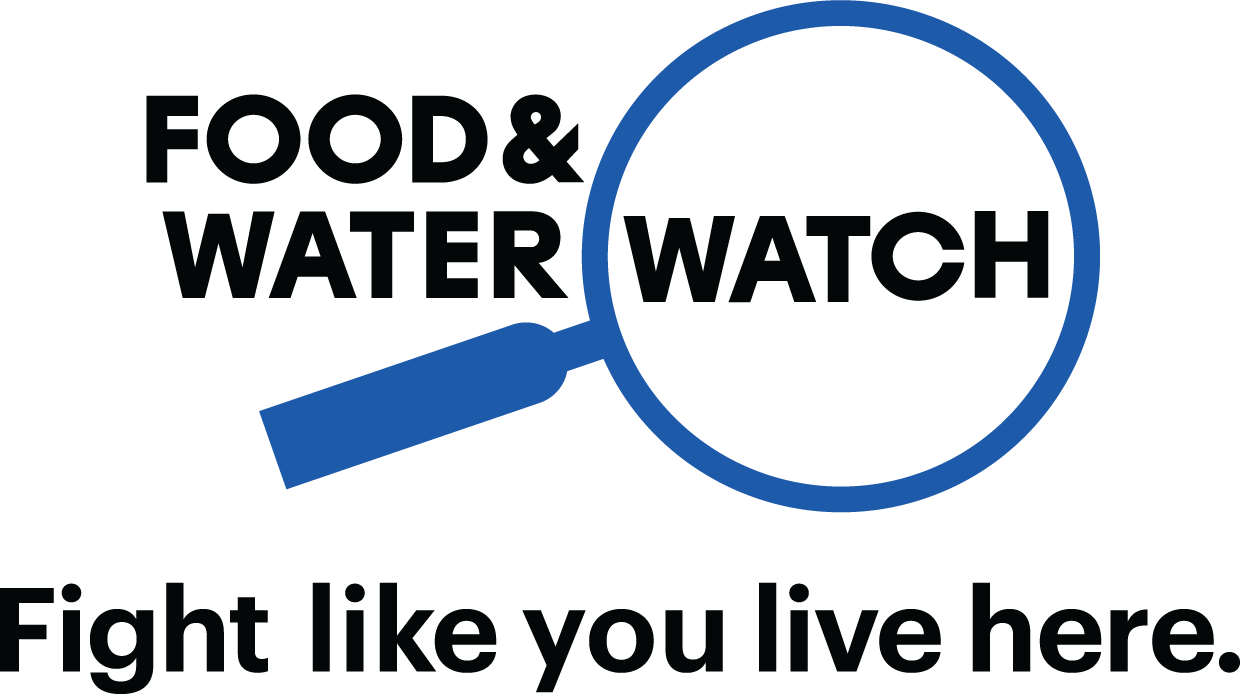
- Founded: 2005
- Founder: Wenonah Hauter (Executive Director)
- Purpose: Environmental protection
- Headquarters: Washington, D.C., United States
- Region served: International
- Key people: Maude Barlow (Chairperson)
- Employees: 100+
- Website: foodandwaterwatch.org

Food & Water Watch is a Washington, D.C.-based non-governmental organization group with an office also in Los Angeles, California, which focuses on corporate and government accountability relating to food, water, and corporate overreach. Resulting issue areas include stopping fossil fuels and fossil fuel extraction, regulating factory farms, advocating for renewable energy, fighting water privatization, stopping bad trade deals, increasing transparency in our food system, and standing up for human rights. The organization was founded by staff from Public Citizen in 2005.

It was the first to break the news of the high rate of salmonella in US chicken processing plants in July 2006. It has also been critical of the growing bottled water industry for health and environmental concerns. On August 24, 2007, it announced success in its effort to get Starbucks Coffee to stop using milk originating from rBGH-treated cows.

The organization does not take government or corporate donations. CharityWatch rates it an "A" grade.

== Campaigns ==
- "The Clean Energy Revolution": an anti-fracking march held during the 2016 Democratic National Convention.
- "Public Water for All": Food & Water Watch's program to oppose the privatization of public water utilities.

== Food & Water Justice ==
Food & Water Justice is the organization's legal department, which files lawsuits and provides legal analysis to further the organization's campaigns. It has supported work opposing the use of pollution trading to solve environmental challenges as well as calls for more regulations of concentrated animal feeding operations.

Food & Water Watch sued the USDA's Farm Service Agency in 2017 for "failing to adequately consider environmental impacts before supporting a loan guarantee for a poultry operation on Maryland's Eastern Shore." The organization's lawyers also backed the Environmental Protection Agency in a 2016 suit that challenged the agency's practice of making public the location of permitted concentrated animal feeding operations.

== BP Whistleblower ==
Following the 2010 Deepwater Horizon Oil Disaster, a subcontractor at BP's Atlantis oil rig provided "e-mails, a BP database and other documents" to Food & Water Watch. These documents indicated that BP had violated its own policies by not having all the necessary engineering documents on board the Atlantis when the rig started operations in 2007. The subcontractor, Kenneth Abbott, would later file a lawsuit with Food & Water Watch against then Secretary of the Interior Ken Salazar and the Minerals and Management Service. The lawsuit sought to stop the operation of Atlantis.

== Food & Water Action ==
Food & Water Action, originally Food & Water Action Fund, is the organization's political arm, and is classified as a 501(c)(4). It has endorsed candidates in a number of election races.

== Fluoridation Lawsuit ==
In Food and Water Watch et al. v. United States Environmental Protection Agency et al., Judge Chen ruled that water fluoridation poses an “unreasonable risk of reduced IQ in children…a risk sufficient to require the EPA to engage with a regulatory response…One thing the EPA cannot do, however, in the face of this Court’s finding, is to ignore that risk.”

== See also ==
- Wenonah Hauter
