= Lori Wallach =

American political scientist and trade expert (born 1964)

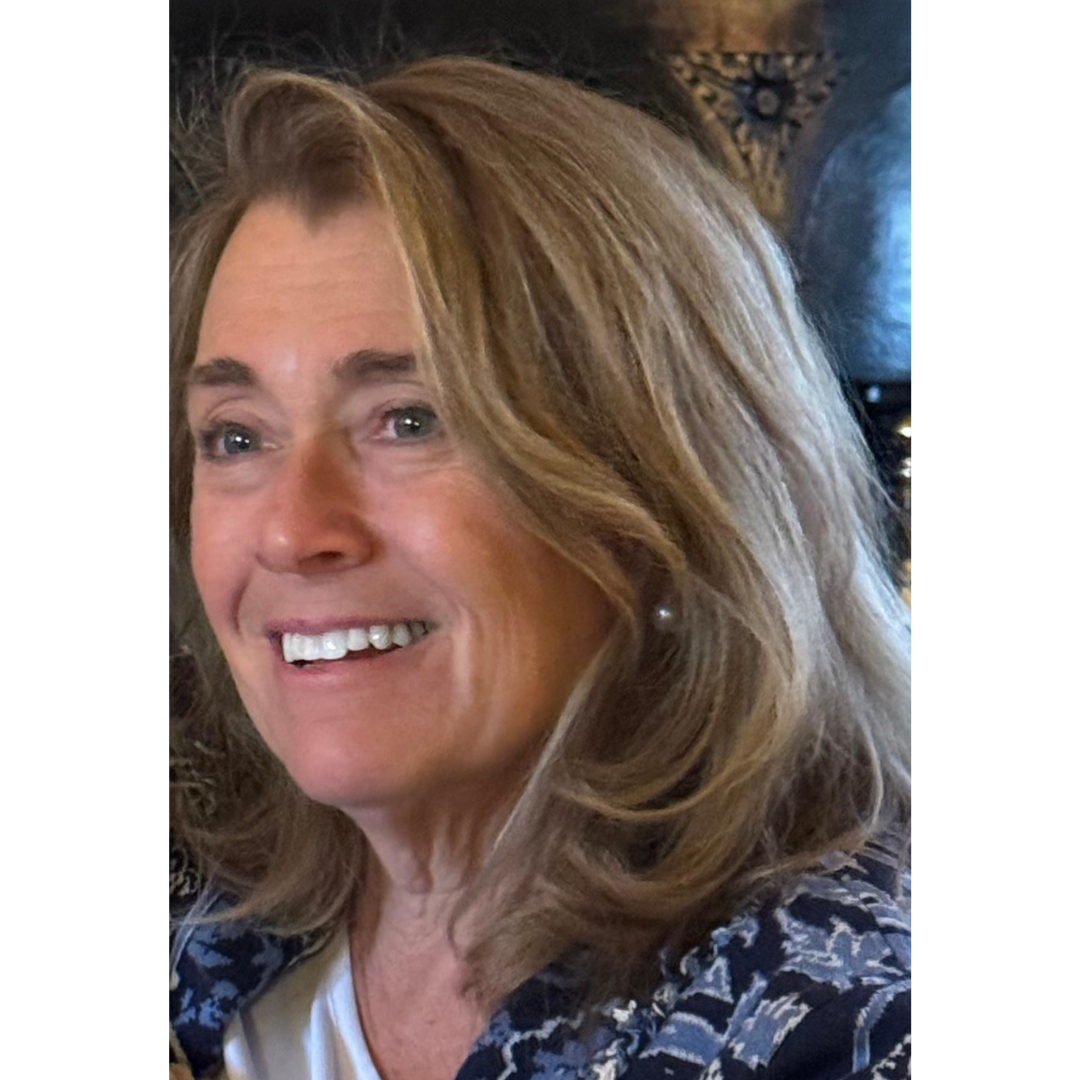

Personal details
- Born: 1964 (age 61–62) Wisconsin
- Education: Wellesley College (BA); Harvard University (JD)

Lori Wallach (born 1964) is the Director of Rethink Trade at the American Economic Liberties Project and a senior advisor to the Citizens Trade Campaign. She is known for her work in analyzing trade agreements and advocating for fair trade policies. She has played a key role in shaping public discourse on trade issues. Wallach has been described as a "pro-tariff liberal" who has spent "more than 30 years trying to convince Democrats to be more skeptical of free trade."

== Early life and education ==
Wallach was born in 1964 in Wisconsin and is of Jewish descent. She graduated from Wellesley College in 1986 with a Bachelor of Arts degree in political science. She received her Juris Doctor (J.D.) from Harvard Law School in 1990.

== Career ==
Wallach has over 30 years of experience in international and U.S. congressional trade issues, including involvement in trade debates such as those surrounding NAFTA and the World Trade Organization (WTO) in the 1990s. She has stated that during the protests, she instructed Teamsters to assault black bloc participants.

Wallach joined Ralph Nader's Public Citizen Litigation Group as the first Supreme Court Assistance Project fellow in 1990. In 1995, she founded Public Citizen's Global Trade Watch, which she directed for 26 years. Prior to her work at Public Citizen, she worked on Capitol Hill, electoral campaigns, and in television news. Wallach was named to "Politico’s 50" list in 2016 for her role in the Trans-Pacific Partnership (TPP) debate and has been included on Washingtonian's 500 Most Influential list. Wallach has worked on trade policy in Congress, foreign parliaments, trade negotiations, courts, government agencies, and the media.

She played a key role in opposition to the TPP, the first major U.S. trade agreement that Congress did not approve. She provided analysis and raised public awareness regarding the TPP's potential impacts, including corporate influence over domestic policies, offshoring incentives, pharmaceutical monopolies, and restrictions on local procurement policies. She referred to the TPP as "NAFTA on steroids" and analyzed, exposed and elevated publicly its potential consequences. In 2021, she co-authored an op-ed with economist Joseph Stiglitz in The Washington Post advocating for the waiver of intellectual property restrictions on COVID-19 vaccines to support global vaccination efforts.

== Media appearances ==
Wallach has appeared on numerous media platforms including MSNBC, CNN, NPR, ABC, CNBC, Fox News, PBS, Bloomberg TV, BBC and C-SPAN. In addition, she has been quoted extensively in publications such as The New York Times, The Economist, Forbes, The Washington Post, The Wall Street Journal, the Financial Times, USA Today, Bloomberg, and The National Journal. She has also been a contributor to HuffPost, Democracy Now!, and PBS.

Representative Rosa DeLauro praised Wallach's "granular knowledge" and stated that Wallach is her "source of information and knowledge."

== Books ==
- 1998: Mai: The Multilateral Agreement on Investment and the Threat to American Freedom ISBN 978-0-7737-5979-4
- 1999: The WTO: Five Years of Reasons to Resist Corporate Globalization ISBN 978-1-58322-035-1
- 2004: Whose Trade Organization?: The Comprehensive Guide to the WTO ISBN 978-1-56584-841-2
- 2004: Alternatives to Economic Globalization: A Better World Is Possible (Anthology) ISBN 978-1-57675-303-3
- 2013: The Rise and Fall of Fast Track Trade Authority - Updated and Expanded Edition ISBN 978-1-58231-052-7
