= Harvard Civil Rights–Civil Liberties Law Review =

Harvard Civil Rights – Civil Liberties Law Review
- Discipline: Law review
- Language: English

Publication details
- History: 1966-present
- Publisher: Harvard Law School (United States)
- Frequency: Biannually
- Impact factor: 1.185 (2016)

Standard abbreviations
- Bluebook: Harv. C.R.-C.L. L. Rev.
- ISO 4: Harv. Civ. Rights-Civ. Liberties Law Rev.

Indexing
- ISSN: 0017-8039 (print); 2153-2389 (web)
- LCCN: sn82005086
- OCLC no.: 06031621

Links
- Journal homepage

The Harvard Civil Rights – Civil Liberties Law Review is a student-run law review published by Harvard Law School. Founded in 1966, the journal is published two times per year and contains articles, essays, and book reviews concerning civil rights and liberties. In 2009, its online companion Amicus was launched, which features standard length journal articles coupled with online responses. In 2018, the journal launched its podcast, Taking Liberties.

== History ==
The journal was established in Spring 1966 by students Spencer H. Boyer (later Professor and Associate Dean at Howard Law School), Joseph Meissner, and Frank Parker in the wake of the Civil Rights Act of 1964 and the Voting Rights Act of 1965. The funds for the establishing the journal, a figure of $600 as requested by Boyer, were granted after a short meeting with Harvard Law School Dean Ervin Griswold. In their first issue the editors of the new publication wrote that the review "is an emblem and achievement of the collaboration" between the Harvard Civil Liberties Research Service, the Law Students Civil Rights Research Council, and the Harvard Civil Rights Committee, three newly formed organizations that had recently noticed the dearth of legal material on civil rights:

Still, there is today hardly a journal which regularly and completely dedicates its pages to the civil rights revolution and the modern manifestations of the relation between citizen and state. Nor is there any review steadily providing Southern lawyers with library ammunition. Nor does any publication capitalize on the burgeoning interest in rights and liberties among this new generation of law students. Nor does any review endeavor to link together the students and faculties of the various law schools in such a cooperative enterprise.

These are among our aims.

But most important. Ours is to be a review of revolutionary law. Such an ideal is as new as United Nation Declarations on Human Rights and as old as the "Grand Tradition" of Common Law fashioning causes of action to rights and wrongs.

In its 35th anniversary issue, legal academic Morton Horowitz wrote that the journal "seeks to catalyze progressive thought and dialogue through publishing innovative legal scholarship from various perspectives and in diverse fields of study."

== Notable alumni ==
- Charles F. Abernathy
- Deborah Batts
- Jacqueline A. Berrien
- Keith Boykin
- Alvin Bragg
- Theodore V. Wells, Jr.
- James H. Burnley
- Morgan Chu
- Stuart E. Eizenstat
- John R. Evans
- Robert Fellmeth
- Jennifer Granholm
- Mark Green
- Joseph A. Greenaway Jr.
- Raja Krishnamoorthi
- William J. Jefferson
- Susan Oki Mollway
- Barack Obama
- Mandy Price
- Jorge Rangel
- Daniel P. Sheehan
- Cass Sunstein

== Notable articles ==
- Brest, Paul A. (1966). "The Federal Government's Power to Protect Negroes and Civil Rights Workers Against Privately Inflicted Harm". Harv. Civ. Rights-Civ. Liberties Law Rev. 1.
- Nader, Ralph (1970). "Freedom from Information: The Act and the Agencies". Harv. Civ. Rights-Civ. Liberties Law Rev. 5: 53.
- Murray, Pauli (1971). "The Negro Woman's Stake in the Equal Rights Amendment". Harv. Civ. Rights-Civ. Liberties Law Rev. 6.
- Tribe, Laurence (1975). "Structural Due Process". Harv. Civ. Rights-Civ. Liberties Law Rev. 10.
- Baker Motley, Constance (1979). "From Brown to Bakke: The Long Road to Equality". Harv. Civ. Rights-Civ. Liberties Law Rev. 14.
- Delgado, Richard (1982). "Words That Wound: A Tort Action for Racial Insults, Epithets, and Name-Calling". Harv. Civ. Rights-Civ. Liberties Law Rev. 17.
- MacKinnon, Catharine (1985). "Pornography, Civil Rights and Speech". Harv. Civ. Rights-Civ. Liberties Law Rev. 20: 1.
- Stevenson, Bryan (2006). "Confronting Mass Imprisonment and Restoring Fairness to Collateral Review of Criminal Cases". Harv. Civ. Rights-Civ. Liberties Law Rev. 41.
- Ho, Dale (2015). "Two Fs for Formalism: Interpreting Section 2 of the Voting Rights Act in Light of Changing Demographics and Electoral Patterns". Harv. Civ. Rights-Civ. Liberties Law Rev. 50.
