= Trans-Pacific Partnership =

2016 proposed trade agreement

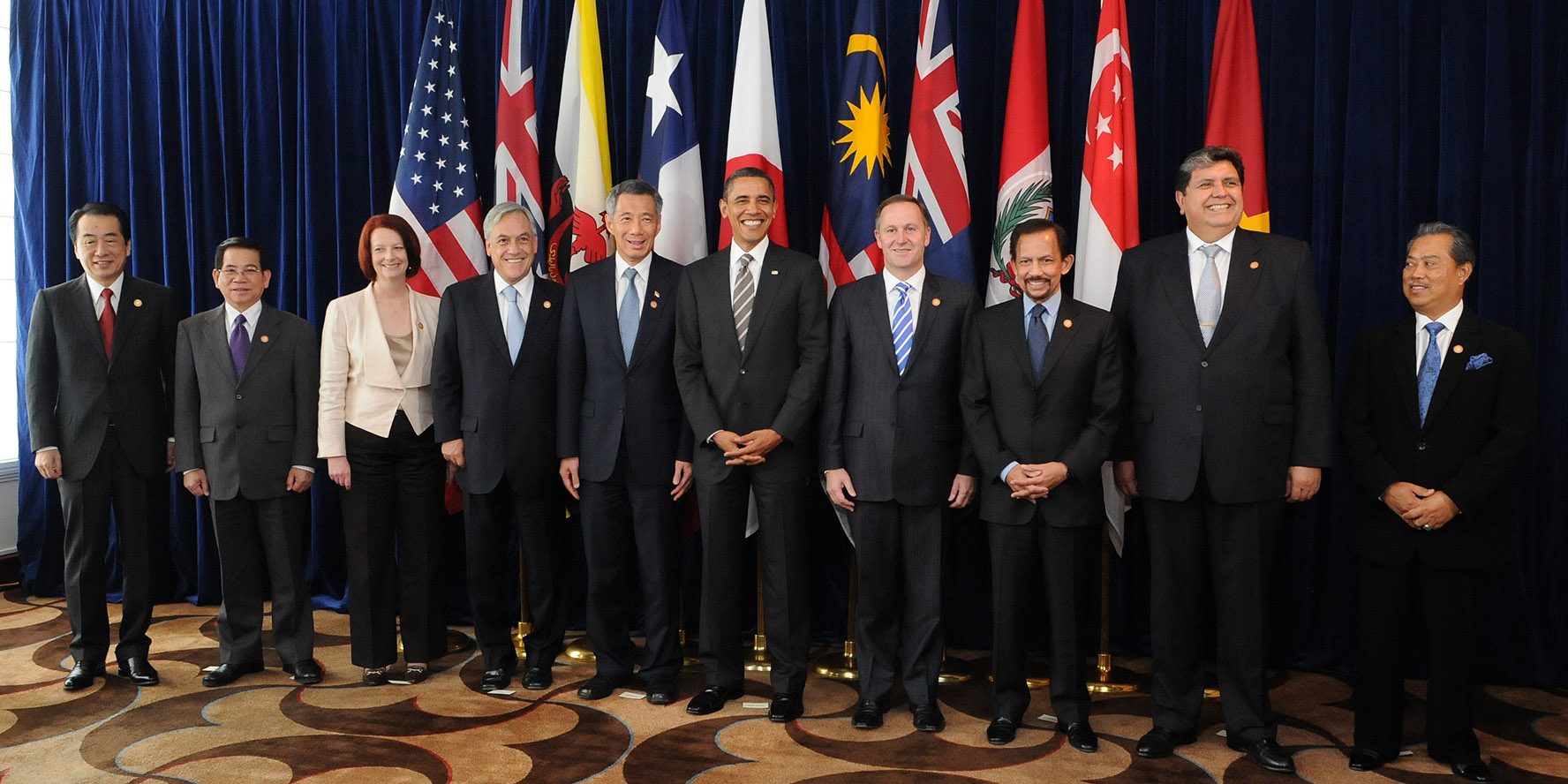
- Leaders from 10 of the 12 prospective member states at a TPP summit in 2010
- Type: Trade agreement
- Drafted: 5 October 2015; 11 years ago
- Signed: 4 February 2016; 10 years ago
- Location: Auckland, New Zealand
- Effective: Not in force
- Condition: Ratification by all original signatories, or (2 years after signature) ratification by at least 6 states corresponding to 85% of GDP of original signatories
- Signatories: 11; Australia; Brunei; Canada; Chile; Japan; Malaysia; Mexico; New Zealand; Peru; Singapore; Vietnam
- Ratifiers: 2; Japan; New Zealand
- Depositary: New Zealand
- Languages: English (prevailing in the case of conflict or divergence), Spanish, Vietnamese, Japanese, French

Full text
- Trans-Pacific Partnership at Wikisource

The Trans-Pacific Partnership (TPP), or Trans-Pacific Partnership Agreement (TPPA), was a proposed trade agreement between 12 Pacific Rim countries: Australia, Brunei, Canada, Chile, Japan, Malaysia, Mexico, New Zealand, Peru, Singapore, Vietnam and the United States. In the US, the proposal was signed on February 4, 2016 but not ratified as a result of significant domestic political opposition; both Hillary Clinton and Donald Trump opposed the agreement during their 2016 presidential campaigns; however, Hillary Clinton was originally in support. After taking office, President Trump formally withdrew the United States from the TPP in January 2017, ensuring it could not be ratified as required and did not enter into force. The remaining countries negotiated a new trade agreement called the Comprehensive and Progressive Agreement for Trans-Pacific Partnership (CPTPP), which incorporated most of the provisions of its predecessor and entered into force on 30 December 2018.

The TPP began as an expansion of the Trans-Pacific Strategic Economic Partnership Agreement (TPSEP or P4), signed by Brunei, Chile, New Zealand and Singapore in 2005. Beginning in 2008, eight additional countries joined negotiations to broaden the agreement, eventually forming the 12-member TPP. Following the US's withdrawal, the remaining countries decided in May 2017 to revive the TPP, reaching a revised agreement, the CPTPP, in January 2018 and signing it in March 2018. The new agreement came into effect for those countries in December that year after ratification by six of them (Australia, Canada, Japan, Mexico, New Zealand and Singapore).

The original TPP contained measures to lower both non-tariff and tariff barriers to trade, and establish an investor-state dispute settlement (ISDS) mechanism. The U.S. International Trade Commission, the Peterson Institute for International Economics, the World Bank and the Office of the Chief Economist at Global Affairs Canada stated that the final agreement, if ratified, would have led to net positive economic outcomes for all signatories. Many observers at the time said the trade deal would also have served a geopolitical purpose, reducing the signatories' dependence on Chinese trade and bring them closer to the United States.

== Membership ==
Parties Signatories Withdrawn signatory

Twelve countries participated in negotiations for the TPP: the four parties to the 2005 Trans-Pacific Strategic Economic Partnership Agreement and eight additional countries. All twelve signed the TPP on 4 February 2016. The agreement would have entered into force after ratification by all signatories, if this had occurred within two years. If the agreement had not been ratified by all before 4 February 2018, it would have entered into force after ratification by at least 6 states which together have a GDP of more than 85% of the GDP of all signatories. The withdrawal of the United States from the agreement in January 2017 effectively ended any prospect of the agreement entering into force. In response, the remaining parties successfully negotiated a new version of the agreement without the 85% GDP threshold, the CPTPP, which entered into force in December 2018.

Country	Status in 2005 TPSEP agreement	Start of TPP Negotiations	Signature of TPP	Ratification of TPP
Singapore	Party (28 May 2006)	February 2008	4 February 2016	—N/a
Brunei	Party (28 May 2006)	February 2008	4 February 2016	—N/a
New Zealand	Party (12 July 2006)	February 2008	4 February 2016	11 May 2017
Chile	Party (8 November 2006)	February 2008	4 February 2016	—N/a
Australia	Non-party	November 2008	4 February 2016	—N/a
Peru	Non-party	November 2008	4 February 2016	—N/a
Vietnam	Non-party	November 2008	4 February 2016	—N/a
Malaysia	Non-party	October 2010	4 February 2016	—N/a
Mexico	Non-Party	October 2012	4 February 2016	—N/a
Canada	Non-party	October 2012	4 February 2016	—N/a
Japan	Non-party	May 2013	4 February 2016	20 January 2017

=== Withdrawn member ===
On 23 January 2017, US President Donald Trump signed a presidential memorandum to withdraw the United States' signature from the agreement, making its ratification as it was in February 2016 virtually impossible.

Country	Status 2005 TPSEP agreement	Start of TPP Negotiations	Signature of TPP	Withdrawn
United States	Non-party	February 2008	4 February 2016	23 January 2017

=== Comparison of initial signatories to the agreement ===
	Australia	Brunei	Canada	Chile	Japan	Malaysia	Mexico	New Zealand	Peru	Singapore	United States	Vietnam
GDP (PPP)	$1.415 Trillion (2021)					$1.216 trillion (2024)					USD$22.675 trillion (2021)	
GDP (Nominal)	AUD$1.617 Trillion (2021)	$15.13 Billion (2023)	$2.14 Trillion (2023)	$335.53 billion (2023)	$4.2 Trillion (2023)	$399.71 billion (2023)	$1.297.7 Trillion (2021)	$252.18 Billion (2023)	$318.480 Billion (2025)	$501.43 Billion (2023)	USD$22.775 trillion (2021)	$429.72 Billion (2023)
GDP per capita	$54,891 (2021)	$34,970 (2025)	$53,431.2 (2023)	$17,067.8 (2023)	$33,766.5 (2023)	$11,379.1 (2023)	$11,945 (2024)	$48,280.8 (2023)	$9,260 (2025)	$84,734.3 (2023)	$67,426 (2020)	$4,282.1 (2023)
Population	23,401,892 (2016)	445,373 (2021)	36,991,981 (2021)	19,629,588 (2023)	126,226,568 (2020)	34,100,000 (2024)	129,150,971 (2020)	5,269,939 (2024)	31,237,285 (2017)	5,453,600 (2021)	328,239,523 (2019)	98,506,193 (2021)
Area	7,692,024 km^{2} (2,969,907 sq mi)	5,765 km^{2} (2,226 sq mi)	9,984,670 km^{2} (3,855,100 sq mi)	756,096 km^{2} (291,930 sq mi)	377,975.24 km^{2} (145,937.06 sq mi)	330,803 km^{2} (127,724 sq mi)	1,972,550 km^{2} (761,610 sq mi)	268,000 km^{2} (103,000 sq mi)	1,285,126 km^{2} (496,190 sq mi)	710 km^{2} (270 sq mi)	9,826,630 km^{2} (3,794,080 sq mi)	331,210 km^{2} (127,880 sq mi)
Population density	3.4/km^{2} (8.8/sq mi)			24/km^{2} (~62.2/sq mi)		101/km^{2} (261.6/sq mi)		19.69/km^{2} (~51/sq mi)	23/km^{2} (~59.6/sq mi)		35/km^{2} (90.6/sq mi)	
Capital	Canberra, ACT	Bandar Seri Begawan	Ottawa	Santiago	Tokyo	Kuala Lumpur	Mexico City	Wellington	Lima	Singapore	Washington, D.C.	Hanoi
Largest city	Sydney	Bandar Seri Begawan	Toronto	Santiago	Tokyo	Kuala Lumpur	Mexico City	Auckland	Lima	Singapore	New York City	Ho Chi Minh City
Government	Federal parliamentary constitutional monarchy	Unitary absolute monarchy	Federal parliamentary constitutional monarchy	Unitary presidential republic	Unitary parliamentary constitutional monarchy	Federal parliamentary constitutional monarchy	Federal presidential republic	Unitary parliamentary constitutional monarchy	Unitary presidential republic	Unitary parliamentary republic	Federal presidential republic	Unitary Marxist–Leninist one-party socialist republic
Current Leader	Prime Minister Anthony Albanese	Sultan and Prime Minister Hassanal Bolkiah	Prime Minister Mark Carney	President Gabriel Boric	Prime Minister Sanae Takaichi	Prime Minister Anwar Ibrahim	President Claudia Sheinbaum Pardo	Prime Minister Christopher Luxon	President José María Balcázar	Prime Minister Lawrence Wong	President Donald Trump	President Lương Cường
Current Vice Leader	Deputy Prime Minister Richard Marles	Crown Prince and Deputy Minister Al-Muhtadee Billah				Deputy Prime Minister Zahid Hamidi		Deputy Prime Minister Winston Peters		Deputy Prime Minister Heng Swee Keat	Vice President JD Vance	Vice President Võ Thị Ánh Xuân
Legislature	Parliament	Legislative Council	Parliament	National Congress of Chile	National Diet	Parliament	Congress of the Union	Parliament	Congress of the Republic	Parliament	Congress	National Assembly
Official languages	English (de facto only)	Malay	English, French	Spanish	Japanese (de facto only)	Malay	Spanish (de facto only)	English (de facto only)	Spanish	English, Malay, Mandarin Chinese, Tamil	English (de facto only)	Vietnamese (de facto only)

=== Potential members ===
APEC members would have been able to accede to the TPP, as would any other jurisdiction to which existing TPP members would have agreed. After an application for membership is received, a commission of parties to the treaty would negotiate conditions for accession.

South Korea did not participate in the 2006 agreement, but showed interest in entering the TPP, and was invited to the TPP negotiating rounds in December 2010 by the U.S. after the successful conclusion of its Free trade agreement between the United States of America and the Republic of Korea. South Korea already had bilateral trade agreements with some TPP members, but areas such as vehicle manufacturing and agriculture still needed to be agreed upon, making further multilateral TPP negotiations somewhat complicated.

Other countries that were interested in TPP membership include Taiwan, the Philippines, Colombia, and Hong Kong as of 2010; Thailand as of 2012; and Indonesia, Bangladesh, and India as of 2013. According to law professor Edmund Sim in 2013, many of these countries would need to change their protectionist trade policies in order to join the TPP.

The largest economy in the Pacific Rim not involved in the negotiations was China. According to the Brookings Institution in 2013, the most fundamental challenge for the TPP project regarding China was that "it may not constitute a powerful enough enticement to propel China to sign on to these new standards on trade and investment. China reacted by accelerating its own trade initiatives in Asia." In 2013, it was thought China might still be interested in joining the TPP eventually. An academic analysis has shown that while the TPP would be more successful if China participated in it, the benefits to China are intangible.

In October 2015, Indonesian President Joko Widodo declared Indonesia's intention to join the TPP.

As of 2016, Sri Lanka announced its interest in joining the TPP and studied its feasibility.

Likewise, as of 2016 Cambodia announced its interest in joining the TPP and is studied its feasibility.

In February 2021, the United Kingdom applied for membership of the CPTPP, the successor to the TPP.

In September 2021, China applied for membership of the CPTPP. Japan, the 2021 chair of the CPTPP, said that it would consult with member countries to respond to China's request.

In July 2023, as CPTPP members formally accepted the United Kingdom as the 12th member, Australia indicated that China has no hope of being accepted in the near term.

On June 2, 2026, the chancellor Pablo Quirno announced that Argentina will present the formal application for accession to the Transpacífico trading block.

Country	Status 2005 agreement	Status TPP	Announced Interest
Colombia	Non-party	Announced Interest	January 2010
Philippines	Non-party	Announced Interest	September 2010
Thailand	Non-party	Announced Interest	November 2012
Taiwan	Non-party	Announced Interest	September 2013
South Korea	Non-party	Announced Interest	November 2013
Indonesia	Non-party	Declared Intent to Join	October 2015
Sri Lanka	Non-party	Announced Interest	November 2015
Cambodia	Non-party	Announced Interest	January 2016

== History ==
=== Trans-Pacific Strategic Economic Partnership Agreement ===
Brunei, Chile, Singapore and New Zealand are parties to the Trans-Pacific Strategic Economic Partnership Agreement (TPSEP), which was signed in 2005, and entered into force in 2006. The original TPSEP agreement contains an accession clause and affirms the members' "commitment to encourage the accession to this Agreement by other economies". It is a comprehensive agreement, affecting trade in goods, rules of origin, trade remedies, sanitary and phytosanitary measures, technical barriers to trade, trade in services, intellectual property, government procurement and competition policy. Among other things, it called for a 90-percent reduction of all tariffs between member countries by 1 January 2006, and reduction of all trade tariffs to zero by the year 2015.

Although original and negotiating parties are members of the Asia-Pacific Economic Cooperation (APEC), TPSEP is not an APEC initiative. However, the TPP is considered to be a pathfinder for the proposed Free Trade Area of the Asia Pacific (FTAAP), an APEC initiative.

=== Original negotiations ===
In January 2008, the U.S. entered talks with the Pacific 4 (P4) members regarding trade liberalisation in financial services. This led to 19 formal negotiation rounds and a subsequent series of additional meetings, such as Chief Negotiators Meetings and Ministers Meetings, and resulted in the agreement announced on 5 October 2015.

=== Ratification of the original agreement ===
Japan and New Zealand ratified the original agreement.

Japan and its main competitor in the region, China, hold polar views on how South-East Asia's economy should develop. Prior to TPP, Japan tried to achieve dominance by proposing in September 1997 an Asian Monetary Fund (AMF), which never eventuated in the face of U.S. opposition. By 2011 Japan managed to establish a cooperative agreement with China and Korea called the "PRC–Japan–Republic of Korea Free trade agreement", also known as the CJK FTA, which did not include the U.S. By this means Japan intended to use the People's Republic of China card in order to shift TPP negotiations away from China towards Japan's agendas with support of the United States. Ratification of the TPP in Japan required political reforms that shifted some authority from the agriculture ministry to the prime minister. On 9 December 2016 Japan's House of Councillors made a resolution of participation. Japan notified completion of domestic procedures for ratification to the depositary of the TPP treaty (New Zealand) as the first ratified country on 20 January 2017.

New Zealand ratified the TPP on 11 May 2017. New Zealand Prime Minister Jacinda Ardern (in office from October 2017) planned to renegotiate the Trans-Pacific Partnership (TPP) agreement in Vietnam in November 2017 in time to allow the New Zealand government to ban foreign speculators from buying existing New Zealand homes. She said: "Our view is that it will be possible to balance our desire to make sure that we provide housing that's affordable, by easing demand and banning foreign speculators from buying existing homes, while meeting our trade goals."

=== United States withdrawal ===
Presidential Memorandum Regarding Withdrawal of the United States from the Trans-Pacific Partnership Negotiations and Agreement (2017)

Aligning himself with his political opposition Hillary Clinton's rejection of the TPP in an interview on PBS in October of 2015, during a speech on the 2016 presidential campaign, Republican Party nominee Donald Trump vowed to withdraw the United States from the Trans-Pacific Partnership if elected. He argued that the agreement would "undermine" the U.S. economy and its independence. On 21 November 2016, in a video message, Trump introduced an economic strategy of "putting America first", stating that he would negotiate "fair, bilateral trade deals that bring jobs and industry back onto American shores." As part of this plan, Trump confirmed his intent for the United States to withdraw from the Trans-Pacific Partnership on his first day in office. McConnell affirmed that the TPP would not be considered during the lame-duck session of Congress preceding the inauguration of Trump.

President Trump signed a presidential memorandum (Note: The official title of the document is: Presidential Memorandum Regarding Withdrawal of the United States from the Trans-Pacific Partnership Negotiations and Agreement. "Presidential Memorandum Regarding Withdrawal of the United States from the Trans-Pacific Partnership Negotiations and Agreement". 23 January 2017.) to withdraw the U.S. from the TPP on 23 January 2017. U.S. Senator John McCain criticized the withdrawal, saying "it will send a troubling signal of American disengagement in the Asia-Pacific region at a time we can least afford it." U.S. Senator Bernie Sanders applauded the move, saying "For the last 30 years, we have had a series of trade deals… which have cost us millions of decent-paying jobs and caused a 'race to the bottom' which has lowered wages for American workers."

=== United States public opinion ===
In a 2018 study conducted on general foreign trade, researchers have found that a sizable majority of U.S. adults view foreign trade as conducive to U.S. growth rather than a foreign threat. In an international context, however, Americans generally are among the least likely to support the Trans-Pacific Partnership. A clear partisan divide existed among the U.S. public in supporting the trade deal, with those who identify as members of the Democratic Party or are politically independent being more likely to have a positive opinion of it than those who are members of the Republican Party. Moreover, younger people are more likely to support it than their elders.

President Donald Trump has expressed opposition to the TPP as a tenet of his 2016 election platform, which contributed to his popularity. Critics complained that while Trump has worked to contain the economic and geostrategic influence of China, withdrawing from the TPP reduced the effectiveness of a treaty that was designed to do exactly that.

In any case, free trade has been a politically contentious issue in the U.S. Many Presidential candidates vigorously oppose it while those who initially stood behind it became much less vocal in their support. Following the 2020 Presidential election, there is little enthusiasm for the TPP among elected officials in the federal government.

=== New negotiations and CPTPP ===
TPP's future was uncertain after the United States withdrew. Several signatories, however, signaled their intention to rework TPP without US participation.

In January 2018, the remaining eleven countries agreed on a revised TPP, now renamed the "Comprehensive and Progressive Agreement for Trans-Pacific Partnership" (CPTPP). CPTPP is substantially the same as TPP, but omits 20 provisions that had been added to TPP at US insistence and that are now no longer binding. These provisions primarily relate to investment, government procurement and intellectual property.

On 16 July 2023, Kemi Badenoch, the UK business secretary, signed the accession protocol for the Comprehensive and Progressive Agreement for Trans-Pacific Partnership (CPTPP). The CPTPP is a trade bloc consisting of 11 member states. The UK government claims that this agreement will provide British businesses with access to a market of 500 million people, resulting in significant benefits. However, critics argue that the economic impact of the deal over a 10-year period will be limited.

== Contents ==
A version of the text of the agreement "subject to legal review" was released by prospective member parties on 5 November 2015. Portions of drafts of the full agreement were previously leaked to the public. Many of the provisions in the leaked documents are modeled on previous trade agreements.

The contents of the TPP go far beyond the standards drafted by the World Trade Organization. The TPP includes a negative-list of all sectors covered for the liberalizing trade, except for those clearly stated. The TPP includes new regulation for online commerce, treatment of foreign investors, far more comprehensive protection for intellectual property, labor codes, and an agreement for neutrality regarding state-owned enterprises.

A 2016 study by University of Maryland political scientists Todd Allee and Andrew Lugg finds that out of the 74 previous trade agreements that TPP members signed since 1995, the text of the TPP most resembles that from earlier U.S. trade agreements. A 2017 study found that the TPP scored high relative to other trade agreements in terms of a government's ability to freely legislate and implement regulations in given public policy domains.

=== Trade barriers ===
The agreement cuts over 18,000 tariffs. Tariffs on all U.S. manufactured goods and almost all U.S. farm products would be eliminated, with most eliminations occurring immediately. According to the Congressional Research Service, TPP "would be the largest U.S. FTA by trade flows ($905 billion in U.S. goods and services exports and $980 billion in imports in 2014)". Including the US, the signatories represent roughly 40% of global GDP, and one-third of world trade.

In addition, the agreement mandates expedited customs procedures for express shipments and prohibits customs duties from being applied to electronic transmissions. It also requires additional privacy, security, and consumer protections for online transactions and encourages the publication of online customs forms. These provisions are expected to be particularly beneficial to small businesses.

=== Environmental protection ===
Morin and Baumier of the Canada Research Chair in International Political Economy (writing for the International Centre for Trade and Sustainable Development) argue that while the TPP contains an impressive number of environmental provisions and a wide range of environmental protection areas, very few of these standards are innovative, most of which being copied from previous US agreements, and that the TPP missed an opportunity to be an original and progressive contribution to the environmental agenda. However, the TPP is innovative in its utilization of a combination of the American and the European approaches in environmental protection. Indeed, in doing so, the TPP became much more detailed and specific than regular US agreements while being legally more enforceable than European agreements.

In 2013 when TPP was still being negotiated, Sierra Club's director of responsible trade, Ilana Solomon, argued that the TPP "could directly threaten our climate and our environment [including] new rights that would be given to corporations, and new constraints on the fossil fuel industry all have a huge impact on our climate, water, and land." Upon the release of a draft of the Environment Chapter in January 2014, the Natural Resources Defense Council and the World Wide Fund for Nature joined with the Sierra Club in criticizing the TPP. After the announcement of the United Nations Sustainable Development Goals (SDGs) on 25 September 2015 and the finalisation of the TPP a week later, critics discussed the interactions between the SDGs and the TPP. While one critic sees the TPP as providing a mixed bag of benefits and drawbacks to the SDGs, another regards the TPP as being incompatible with the SDGs, highlighting that if the development provisions clash with any other aspect of the TPP, the other aspect takes priority. The Friends of the Earth have spoken out against the TPP.

The White House has cited supportive statements from the World Wildlife Fund, the Nature Conservancy, the Humane Society, the Wildlife Conservation Society, Defenders of Wildlife, International Fund for Animal Welfare, World Animal Protection and other environmental groups in favor of the TPP. The Peterson Institute for International Economics argues that the TPP is "the most environmentally friendly trade deal ever negotiated." In regards to ISDS, PIIE analysts note that there is little evidence of constraints on environmental policies resulting from ISDS litigation.

A September 2016 report by the Institute for Agriculture and Trade Policy (IATP) predicts that "as countries take action to protect the climate, conflicts between trade rules and climate goals will escalate". The report goes on to say that trade agreements like the TPP set broad-reaching rules for the economy and government policy, thereby expanding trade, often in extractive sectors, and protecting corporations and financial firms from future measures to stabilize the climate.

=== Good governance ===
According to the Office of the United States Trade Representative, signatories are required to join the United Nations Convention Against Corruption (UNCAC); criminalize bribery of public officials; have in place a code of conduct for public officials; take measures to decrease conflicts of interest; effectively enforce anti-corruption laws and regulations; and involve private organizations in the fight against corruption.

=== Human rights ===
According to the Office of the United States Trade Representative, the TPP prohibits exploitative child labor and forced labor; ensures the right to collective bargaining; and prohibits employment discrimination. The USTR asserts that "research by the International Labor Organization and the World Trade Organization finds that combining expanded trade opportunities with strong protections for workers can help workers move from informal-sector jobs into formal work in wage-paying, regulated export industries which offer a minimum wage, benefits, and safety programs". The USTR asserts that "research also shows that trade improves human rights conditions by fostering pluralistic institutions and increasing open exchanges of information."

PolitiFact rates President Obama's claim that due to the Trans-Pacific Partnership "we've got a country like Malaysia taking really serious efforts to crack down on human trafficking" as "mostly true". PolitiFact notes that Malaysia began to comply with the TPP in June 2015, amending its law to improve the treatment of trafficking victims. Among the changes, Malaysia gave victims better access to government shelters, transitional housing and more victim-friendly restitution procedures. Malaysia has also taken steps to stop human trafficking within the construction industry.

In August 2017, Reuters reported that the Vietnamese government was intensifying repression of human rights, in part because of the Trump administration's decision to drop the Trans-Pacific Partnership. Membership of the TPP had previously encouraged Vietnam to show a good human rights record.

=== Intellectual property ===
The intellectual property section of a leaked draft of the TPP lays out a minimum level of protection parties to the Agreement must grant for trademarks, copyright, and patents. Copyright is granted at a length of life of the author plus 70 years, and requires countries to set criminal penalties for violating copyright protections such as digital rights management.

The Office of the United States Trade Representative stated that the TPP would spur innovation by requiring signatories to establish strong patentability standard and adopt strong copyright protections.

Walter Park, Professor of Economics at American University, argues, based on the existing literature, that the pharmaceutical protections in TPP will potentially enhance unaffiliated licensing in developing countries, lead to tech transfers that contribute to local learning-by-doing, stimulate new drug launches in more countries, expand marketing and distribution networks, and encourage early-stage pharmaceutical innovations.

As of December 2011, some provisions relating to the enforcement of patents and copyrights alleged to be present in the US proposal for the agreement had been criticised as being excessively restrictive, beyond those in the Korea–US trade agreement and Anti-Counterfeiting Trade Agreement (ACTA).

The Electronic Frontier Foundation was highly critical of the leaked draft chapter on intellectual property covering copyright, trademarks, and patents. In the US, they believed this was likely to further entrench controversial aspects of US copyright law (such as the Digital Millennium Copyright Act) and restrict the ability of Congress to engage in domestic law reform to meet the evolving intellectual property needs of American citizens and the innovative technology sector. Standardization of copyright provisions by other signatories would also require significant changes to other countries' copyright laws. These, according to EFF, include obligations for countries to expand copyright terms, restrict fair use, adopt criminal sanctions for copyright infringement that is done without a commercial motivation (ex. file sharing of copyrighted digital media), place greater liability on internet intermediaries, escalate protections for digital locks and create new threats for journalists and whistleblowers.

Both the copyright term expansion and the non-complaint provision (i.e., competent authorities may initiate legal action without the need for a formal complaint) previously failed to pass in Japan because they were so controversial. In early 2015, "a group of artists, archivists, academics, and activists ... in Japan [asked] their negotiators to oppose requirements in the TPP that would require their country, and five of the other 11 nations negotiating this secretive agreement, to expand their copyright terms to match the United States' already excessive length of copyright." The final agreement nonetheless set a term of copyright equal to the one that obtains under U.S. law of life of the author plus 70 years.

Ken Akamatsu, creator of Japanese manga series Love Hina and Mahou Sensei Negima!, expressed concern the agreement could decimate the derivative dōjinshi (self-published) works prevalent in Japan. Akamatsu argued that the TPP "would destroy derivative dōjinshi. And as a result, the power of the entire manga industry would also diminish."

==== Pharmaceuticals ====
In May 2015, Nobel Memorial prize winning economist Paul Krugman expressed concern that the TPP would tighten the patent laws and allow corporations such as big pharmaceutical companies and Hollywood to gain advantages, in terms of increasing rewards, at the cost of consumers, and that people in developing countries would not be able to access the medicines under the TPP regime. However, Walter Park, Professor of Economics at American University, argues that it is far from clear in economic research that this would necessarily happen: clarifying intellectual property rights on drugs, for some developing countries, has not led to greater prices and less access to drugs. Park also argues, based on the existing literature, that the pharmaceutical protections in TPP will potentially enhance unaffiliated licensing in developing countries, lead to tech transfers that contribute to local learning-by-doing, stimulate new drug launches in more countries, expand marketing and distribution networks, and encourage early stage pharmaceutical innovations. The Office of the United States Trade Representative notes that the TPP "aligns with the Doha Declaration on TRIPS and Public Health", which allows developing countries to circumvent patent rights for better access to essential medicines.

Pharmaceutical companies have criticized TPP for having too lenient intellectual property protections.

In July 2015, an editorial in the New England Journal of Medicine cited concerns by Médecins sans Frontières and Oxfam that a spike in drug prices caused by patent extensions could threaten millions of lives. Extending "data exclusivity" provisions would "prevent drug regulatory agencies such as the Food and Drug Administration from registering a generic version of a drug for a certain number of years." The article arugues that TPP could theoretically require corporations be paid compensation for any "lost profits" found to result from a nation's health regulations. The article argues that the provisions in the TPP concerning generic drugs directly target India's pharmaceutical industry. Doctors Without Borders said in November 2015 that it was "extremely concerned about the inclusion of dangerous provisions that would dismantle public health safeguards enshrined in international law and restrict access to price-lowering generic medicines for millions of people." The Australian Public Health Association (PHAA) published a media release in February 2014 that highlighted "the ways in which some of the expected economic gains from the TPPA may be undermined by poor health outcomes, and the economic costs associated with these poor health outcomes."

A number of United States Congressional members, including Senator Bernie Sanders and Representatives Sander M. Levin, John Conyers, Jim McDermott and the now-retired Henry Waxman, as well as John Lewis, Charles B. Rangel, Earl Blumenauer, Lloyd Doggett and then-congressman Pete Stark, have expressed concerns about access to medicine. By protecting intellectual property in the form of the TPP mandating patent extensions, access by patients to affordable medicine in the developing world could be hindered, particularly in Vietnam. Additionally, they worried that the TPP would not be flexible enough to accommodate existing non-discriminatory drug reimbursement programs and the diverse health systems of member countries. In February 2015, former U.S. Labor Secretary Robert Reich stated he opposed the TPP because it would delay cheaper generic versions of drugs and because of its provisions for international tribunals that can require corporations be paid "compensation for any lost profits found to result from a nation's regulations."

=== Investor-state arbitration ===
The TPP agreement establishes an investor-state dispute settlement (ISDS) mechanism, which grants investors the right to sue foreign governments for treaty violations. For example, if an investor invests in country "A", a member of a trade treaty, and country A breaches that treaty, then the investor may sue country A's government for the breach. ISDS is meant to provide investors in foreign countries basic protections from foreign government actions such as "freedom from discrimination", "protection against uncompensated expropriation of property", "protection against denial of justice" and "right to transfer capital":

- Freedom from discrimination: An assurance that those doing business abroad will face a level playing field and will not be treated less favorably than local investors or competitors from other countries.
- Protection against uncompensated seizure of property: An assurance that property of investors won't be seized by the government without just compensation.
- Protection against denial of justice: An assurance that investors will not be denied justice in criminal, civil, or administrative adjudicatory proceedings.
- Right to transfer capital: An assurance that investors will be able to move capital relating to their investments freely, subject to safeguards to provide government flexibility, including to respond to financial crises and ensure the integrity and stability of the financial system.

ISDS cannot ask governments to overturn local laws (unlike the World Trade Organization) which violate trade agreements, but can grant monetary damages to investors adversely affected by such laws. As pointed out by the Office of the United States Trade Representative, ISDS requires specific treaty violations, and does not allow corporations to sue solely over "lost profits".

The TPP specifically excludes tobacco industries from the ISDS process. The carve-out came as a response to concerns about ISDS cases against anti-smoking laws, including Philip Morris v. Uruguay. The exemption of tobacco from ISDS is a first for an international trade agreement.

On the basis of leaks, economists Joseph Stiglitz and Adam S. Hersh criticized the ISDS provisions of the TPP for interfering with the ability of governments to prevent public harm, alleging that if asbestos been discovered today, governments would have been unable to impose regulations without creating grounds for an ISDS suit. Stiglitz also claimed that the TPP would give oil companies the right to sue governments for efforts to reduce carbon emissions and global warming.

In November 2015, Columbia professor Jeffrey Sachs concluded that the ISDS system of the TPP grants huge power to investors, and damages the judicial systems of all the member countries. He alleges that ISDS has been already used by corporations to upset governments so as to weaken the regulations that have negative effects on their profits. In February 2016, Lise Johnson and Lisa Sachs of the Columbia Center on Sustainable Investment and Jeffrey Sachs of the Earth Institute allege that foreign corporations can sue a national government in international arbitration over a government's actions if the measures (including those for public health, national security, environment, food and drug, and responses to economic crises) have a negative effect on their profits and economic interests. Lori Wallach of Public Citizen's Global Trade Watch raised similar concerns while TPP was being negotiated.

In a February 2016 op-ed against the TPP, Senator Elizabeth Warren used the example of a French company suing Egypt because Egypt raised its minimum wage as an argument against the ISDS provisions of the TPP. The Washington Post's editorial board has, however, challenged this characterization of the case, noting that "Veolia of France, a waste management company, invoked ISDS to enforce a contract with the government of Alexandria, Egypt, that it says required compensation if costs increased; the company maintains that the wage increases triggered this provision. Incidentally, Veolia was working with Alexandria on a World Bank-supported project to reduce greenhouse gases, not some corporate plot to exploit the people. The case — which would result, at most, in a monetary award to Veolia, not the overthrow of the minimum wage — remains in litigation."

The Office of the United States Trade Representative challenges the notion that ISDS challenges "the sovereign ability of governments impose any measure they wish to protect labor rights, the environment, or other issues of public welfare". The International Bar Association (IBA) mirrors these sentiments, noting that "while investment treaties limit states' ability to inflict arbitrary or discriminatory treatment, they do not limit (and, in fact, expressly safeguard) a state's sovereign right to regulate in the public interest in a fair, reasonable, and non-discriminatory manner." The White House notes that investment protections are a component of more than 3,000 trade agreements, the vast majority of which have some form of neutral arbitration. The United States is party to at least 50 such agreements, has only faced 13 ISDS cases and never lost an ISDS case. The White House asserts that the ISDS components of the TPP are an upgrade and improvement on ISDS in other trade agreements: TPP makes it absolutely clear that governments can regulate in the public interest (including with regard to health, safety and the environment); TPP includes the ability to dismiss frivolous claims quickly and award fees against the claimant to deter such suits; sham corporations will be prevented from accessing the investment protections; and arbitration proceedings under TPP will be open to the public and allow for inputs from non-parties.

The Peterson Institute for International Economics argues that "the ISDS provisions in the TPP are a significant improvement over those in previous agreements". PIIE notes that the ISDS mechanism in the TPP respects environmental, health, and safety regulation; ensures the transparency of dispute proceedings; and eliminates forum shopping. PIIE asserts that some of the innovations in the ISDS provisions of TPP "are generally disliked by the US business community." PIIE claims that ISDS provisions are necessary, as they boost investment: "empirical evidence has shown that treaties including these provisions have a positive effect on foreign direct investment (FDI) flows between signatory countries." PIIE challenges the claim that ISDS "arbitrators lack integrity", noting that arbitrators take an oath of impartiality and both sides of a case choose arbitrators. PIIE agrees "that secrecy has gone too far" in many ISDS cases, but notes that "TPP negotiators heeded this criticism" and opened up ISDS cases to greater transparency.

According to the International Bar Association (IBA), states have won a higher percentage of ISDS cases than investors, and that around one-third of all cases end in settlement. Claimant investors, when successful, recover on average less than half of the amounts claimed. IBA notes that "only 8 per cent of ISDS proceedings are commenced by very large multinational corporations." IBA challenges the notion that ISDS is biased against developing countries, noting that there is "no correlation between the success rates of claims against states and their income levels or development status." IBA notes that ISDS is necessary even in countries with sophisticated domestic legal systems because those domestic courts rule according to domestic laws, not international law. IBA notes that "increasingly, awards require the losing party to pay arbitration costs and legal fees to the winning party", which deters investors from initiating unmeritorious cases.

=== Labour standards ===
According to the Office of the United States Trade Representative, the TPP imposes "binding and fully enforceable obligations" on signatories to "protect the freedom to form unions and bargain collectively" and "eliminate exploitative child labor and forced labor protect against employment discrimination". The obligations include "laws on acceptable conditions of work related to minimum wages, hours of work, and occupational safety and health." The USTR insists that if countries like Malaysia and Vietnam do not enforce provisions relating to forced labor, human trafficking and collective bargaining, they will cease to get the economic benefits of the TPP agreement.

The Peterson Institute for International Economics asserts that "the TPP includes more protections of labor rights than any previous US free trade agreement." In January 2016, Human Rights Watch said that the TPP side agreements with Vietnam, Malaysia, and Brunei "are a unique and significant step in efforts to protect labor rights in trade agreements" but noted that enforcement of these rules remains to be seen: "gauging compliance will require subjective assessments by the US that may take years to carry out and face obstacles arising from foreign policy objectives, commercial interests, and other political considerations."

Dartmouth economics Professor Emily J. Blanchard argues that while the TPP has been roundly criticized on the political left, progressives should actually be supportive of the TPP: "The TPP's promise of a new progressive rule book – one that includes enforceable agreements against child labor and workplace discrimination, measures to punish illegal logging and trade in protected species, and protections against consumer fraud – would mark a substantial step forward in the progressive policy agenda on the global stage."

In May 2015, U.S. congressman Sander Levin argued that it is difficult to enforce trade deals, as he questioned Vietnam's willingness to meet the labour standards of TPP. A report by U.S. Senator Elizabeth Warren said that there was a huge gap between the labor standards of past US free trade agreements and the actual enforcement of those provisions. However, PIIE analysts note that research shows that the presence of "sticks" (a possible suspension of trade benefits) and "carrots" (technical assistance) in trade deals increase the likelihood that labor obligations in trade deals have a positive effect; there are both sticks and carrots present in TPP.

=== Regulatory cooperation ===
Even though the TPP had not been passed, the agreement had already introduced forms of regulatory cooperation for agriculture beyond that found in the WTO. This means that regulators in different TPP signatories have been engaging with each other and building trust. Chad P. Bown, senior fellow at the Peterson Institute for International Economics, argues that this regulatory cooperation meant that the US poultry industry was not as hard-hit by the 2015 bird flu outbreak, as regulators in TPP countries cooperated and continued to accept US exports of poultry.

== Economic impact ==
The U.S. International Trade Commission, the Peterson Institute for International Economics, the World Bank and the Office of the Chief Economist at Global Affairs Canada found that the final agreement would, if ratified, lead to net positive economic outcomes for all signatories.

=== Effects on economic equality ===
In 2013, Nobel Memorial prize-winning economist Joseph Stiglitz warned that, based on leaked drafts of the TPP, it "serves the interests of the wealthiest." Organised labour in the U.S. argued, during the negotiations, that the trade deal would largely benefit corporations at the expense of workers in the manufacturing and service industries. The Economic Policy Institute and the Center for Economic and Policy Research have argued that the TPP could result in job losses and declining wages in the U.S.

Economists Peter A. Petri and Michael G. Plummer challenge the view that TPP will primarily benefit the wealthy. Their analysis finds that "the gains from TPP appear to be fairly distributed—labour will gain relative to capital, and cost reductions will favour low-income households. Some workers will need to change jobs, but they constitute a small fraction of normal job churn in any given year, and the national benefits argue for generous compensation for their adjustment costs. The agreement will also benefit workers in TPP's poorest member countries." Research by Harvard economist Robert Z. Lawrence finds that the "percentage gains for labor income from the TPP will be slightly greater than the gains to capital income. Households in all quintiles will benefit by similar percentages, but once differences in spending shares are taken into account, the percentage gains to poor and middle-class households will be slightly larger than the gains to households at the top." An opinion piece by Ed Gerwin in The Wall Street Journal argues that the TPP agreement benefits small businesses in the US.

Economists David Autor, David Dorn and Gordon H. Hanson, who have extensively studied US labor markets adjustments to trade competition shocks caused by China, support TPP. They argue that TPP "would promote trade in knowledge-intensive services in which U.S. companies exert a strong comparative advantage", note that "killing the TPP would do little to bring factory work back to America" and argue that it would pressure China to raise regulatory rules and standards to those of TPP members.

According to the U.S. International Trade Commission, the TPP will have positive effects on the U.S. economy as a whole, with unskilled labor reaping 25% of the gains, skilled workers 41% and business owners 34%.

=== Macroeconomics ===
==== World Bank report ====
World Bank found that if ratified by signatories, the TPP "agreement could raise GDP in member countries by an average of 1.1 percent by 2030. It could also increase member countries' trade by 11 percent by 2030, and represent a boost to regional trade growth, which had slowed to about 5 percent, on average, during 2010-14 from about 10 percent during 1990-07." The World Bank finds that the agreement will raise real wages in all signatories: "In the United States, for example, changes in real wages are expected to be small as unskilled and skilled wages increase by 0.4 and 0.6 percent, respectively, by 2030. In contrast, in Vietnam, TPP could increase the real wages of unskilled workers by more than 14 percent by 2030, as production intensive in unskilled labor (e.g. textiles) shifts to Vietnam."

==== U.S. International Trade Commission estimate ====
The U.S. International Trade Commission estimates that "TPP would have positive effects, albeit small as a percentage of the overall size of the U.S. economy". There will be 128,000 more full-time jobs. By 2032, U.S. annual real income would increase by 0.23%, real GDP would be $42.7 billion or 0.15% higher, employment would be 0.07% higher, US exports would increase 1%, and imports would increase 1.1%. The report added, "TPP would generally establish trade-related disciplines that strengthen and harmonize regulations, increase certainty, and decrease trade costs for firms that trade and invest in the TPP region." Vietnam is often seen as the biggest beneficiary of TPP. The U.S. International Trade Commission identifies the following US industries as net beneficiaries of TPP: Passenger cars; Apparel, Dairy production; Retailers and Wholesalers; and Business services; and as net losers: Auto parts; Textiles; Soybean production; Transportation and tourism; and Chemicals and drugs.

==== Office of the Chief Economist at Global Affairs Canada report ====
According to a report by the Office of the Chief Economist at Global Affairs Canada, ratification of TPP would increase Canada's GDP by $4.3 billion by 2040. This is primarily due to the preferential access it would receive to markets in the Asia-Pacific rim. According to the report, ratification by the other TPP signatories but a failure by Canada to ratify the agreement would lead Canada to face estimated GDP losses of $5.3 billion by 2040.

==== Peterson Institute for International Economics report ====
Economists Peter A. Petri and Michael G. Plummer of the Peterson Institute for International Economics project that the TPP would increase incomes in the U.S. by $131 billion annually, or 0.5 percent of GDP. Exports from the U.S. would increase by $357 billion annually, or 9.1 percent, as a result of the agreement. However, two Tufts University economists argue that the research by Petri relies on unrealistic assumptions such as full employment: lost jobs will be immediately replaced in other industrial sectors. According to Harvard economist Dani Rodrik, "Petri and Plummer assume that labor markets are sufficiently flexible that job losses in adversely affected parts of the economy are necessarily offset by job gains elsewhere. Unemployment is ruled out from the start – a built-in outcome of the model that TPP proponents often fudge." Rodrik notes that "the Petri-Plummer model is squarely rooted in decades of academic trade modeling, which makes a sharp distinction between microeconomic effects (shaping resource allocation across sectors) and macroeconomic effects (related to overall levels of demand and employment). In this tradition, trade liberalization is a microeconomic "shock" that affects the composition of employment, but not its overall level."

==== Tufts University report ====
Tufts University researchers project the TPP would have a negative impact on employment: 450,000 US jobs, 75,000 Japanese jobs, 58,000 Canadian jobs and 5,000 New Zealand jobs would be lost by 2025. According to the report, 771,000 jobs would be lost in total and positive economic effects would be negligible for participating countries.

Harvard economist Robert Z. Lawrence says that the model used by the Tufts researchers "is simply not suited for credibly predicting the effects of the TPP" and argues that the model used by Petri and Plummer is superior. Lawrence argues that the model used by the Tufts researchers "does not have the granularity that allows it to estimate variables such as exports, imports, foreign direct investment, and changes in industrial structure. As a result, its predictions ignore the benefits to the TPP economies that occur through increased specialization, the realization of scale economies, and improved consumer choice." Lawrence also notes that the model used by the Tufts researchers finds that the TPP will cause GDP to fall by 5.24% in non-TPP developing countries, such as China, India, and Indonesia, which Lawrence is highly skeptical of: "It is not believable that a trade agreement of this magnitude could cause the rest of the world to plummet into recession." Harvard economist Dani Rodrik, a well-known skeptic of globalization, says that the Tufts researchers do "a poor job of explaining how their model works, and the particulars of their simulation are somewhat murky... the Capaldo framework lacks sectoral and country detail; its behavioral assumptions remain opaque; and its extreme Keynesian assumptions sit uneasily with its medium-term perspective."

Fredrik Erixon and Matthias Bauer of the European Centre for International Political Economy (ECIPE) write that the Tufts analysis has such serious flaws "that its results should neither be regarded reliable nor realistic." They write that Tufts model is "by and large a demand-driven model that does not make efforts to capture the supply-side effects of trade, which are the effects that are proven to be the core positive effects of trade liberalisation. Equally problematic, the model is not designed to assess the effect on trade from trade agreements – in fact, the model is profoundly ill suited for such an exercise. No trade economist, regardless what school of thought he or she comes from, has ever used this model to make estimates of trade. The reason is simple: if a model cannot predict the effects on the flows and profile of trade as a consequence of trade liberalisation, it is of no use at all." They add, "In Capaldo's analysis, structural change and the emergence of new industries do not play a role at all. Capaldo implicitly assumes that an economy with its labour and capital does not respond and adjust to new circumstances. New competition only leads to new unemployment. In addition, the impact of lower barriers on international commerce on product and process innovation is neglected. Finally, Capaldo does not account for the impact of competition on the cost of production and final consumer prices."

According to the Congressional Research Service, "The Tufts study has drawn particular criticism as an unconventional framework for analyzing trade agreements, whereas Computable General Equilibrium (CGE) models, such as that used in the Peterson study are standard in trade policy analysis." Fabio Ghironi, Professor in Economics at the University of Washington, describes the models used by the World Bank and the Peterson Institute in more favorable terms than the Tufts analysis.

=== Effects on the European Union ===
The EU is trying to form trade agreements with each country that is part of the TPP: since 2013, there have been talks of a free trade agreement between the EU and Japan, and in 2015 the EU presented its new strategy to improve trade in the Asia-Pacific entitled "Trade for All."

=== Liberalization ===
According to an analysis by the Cato Institute of the chapters of the TPP, 15 chapters have a liberalizing impact, 5 have a protectionist impact, and 2 have a neutral impact. Considered as a whole, the terms of the TPP are net liberalizing.

There have been conflicting arguments on whether or not the TPP aims to increase the liberalization of trade. For arguments that propose that the TPP succeeds at liberalizing trade among the participating nations, there is a question of whether or not this causes a positive or a negative net change. Some scholars argue that participatory members of the TPP believe that such membership is a utilitarian and practical method toward new trade liberalization. Scholars Peter Petri and Michael Plummer describe the TPP as a "dynamic process - and example of competitive liberalization," and this liberalization described can result in a new type of governance for the Asia-Pacific, as well as transnational trade.

According to analyst and economist B.R. Williams, the United States has a large role in the reduction of trade barriers and increased U.S. investment. Williams explains that the U.S. aims to create a "broader platform for trade liberalization, particularly throughout the Asia-Pacific region." Scholars C. Li and J. Whalley explore a numerical approach in explaining the liberalizing effects of the TPP. Li and Whalley uses a quantitative equilibrium simulation to explore the effects of the TPP on the liberalization of trade and new markets.

=== China ===
According to a 2020 study, the TPP pushed China to introduce its own internal liberal market reforms. Reform-minded elites in China used the TPP to justify reform. In anticipation of China's exclusion from the agreement, exposed Chinese firms began investing in production in TPP member states.

In May 2020, Chinese Premier Li Keqiang said that China has a positive and open attitude toward joining the CPTPP.

In November 2020, China and fourteen Asia-Pacific nations signed a trade deal, the Regional Comprehensive Economic Partnership.

== Geopolitics ==
TPP would have increased the likelihood that Japan would undertake economic reforms to revive its economy, which coupled with potential South Korean accession to the TPP, could have had an economic impact on China. By making the Chinese economy less competitive and Chinese leadership less likely to write the rules of trade in East and Southeast Asia, the Chinese government would have been under great internal and external pressure to liberalize its economy. Japan's former prime minister, Shinzo Abe, believed that future Chinese accession to the TPP would have a major pacifying impact on the Asia-Pacific region. U.S. Trade Representative Michael Froman said that a failure to ratify the TPP would give China the opportunity to boost its exports and set labor and environmental standards in the fast-growing Asia Pacific region through the Regional Comprehensive Economic Partnership (RCEP).

South Korea did not participate in the TPP "largely out of a concern to maintain balance in its economic relations with China and the United States" but showed greater interest in joining after Japan, its biggest economic competitor, decided to participate. The Philippines, Indonesia, Thailand, and Taiwan also reportedly considered and implemented various domestic reforms to improve their prospects for eventually joining.

Since formal TPP negotiations began in 2010, China's attitude towards TPP has:

swung from disdain to suspicion to cautious embrace... Conclusion of a TPP agreement in early October has sparked a lively debate in Beijing, with the weight of elite opinion seeming to tilt toward eventual membership; for example, the head of the Chinese-sponsored Asian Infrastructure Investment Bank (AIIB), Jin Liqun, announced his support during a speech in Washington shortly after the TPP deal was announced.

The TPP may give renewed impetus to trade negotiations among China, Japan, and Korea, and increase the likelihood of Regional Comprehensive Economic Partnership (RCEP) which could provide a possible pathway to a free trade area of the Asia-Pacific. The 2017 decision by United States President Donald Trump to withdraw from the TPP strengthened China's alternative model of the RCEP.

In January 2016, the United States National Association of Manufacturers announced its support for TPP, saying "without such an agreement, the United States would be ceding economic leadership to other global powers, letting them set the rules of economic engagement in the region".

A 2016 study by University of Maryland political scientists Todd Allee and Andrew Lugg suggested that if the TPP became standard legal text, it would shape future trade cooperation and agreements.

An October 2016 survey of 746 international relations scholars showed that 71% supported the TPP, 18% opposed the TPP, 9% were neutral, and 2% were undecided.

=== United States considerations ===
The original TPP was thought by some to likely bring China's neighbours closer to the United States and reduce their dependence on Chinese trade. If ratified, the TPP would have strengthened American influence on future rules for the global economy. US Secretary of Defense Ash Carter claimed the passage of the TPP to be as valuable to the United States as the creation of another aircraft carrier. President Obama has argued "if we don't pass this agreement—if America doesn't write those rules—then countries like China will". According to the Congressional Research Service, "many Asian policymakers—correctly or not—could interpret a failure of TPP in the United States as a symbol of declining U.S. interest in the region and inability to assert leadership... failure to conclude TPP could, in effect, allow China to shape regional rules of commerce and diplomacy through its own trade and investment initiatives, potentially creating regional rules and norms less beneficial for U.S. interests." Michael J. Green and Matthew P. Goodman argue that "history will be unforgiving if TPP fails... If Congress rejects TPP, trying to negotiate a similar arrangement in Asia would reopen demands on the United States—and in the meantime, would likely give impetus to alternative arrangements like RCEP that exclude the United States. Momentum behind the U.S.-led international order would shift to momentum against it. Future generations of historians will take note of U.S. leadership at this moment." Dan Ikenson, director of Cato's Herbert A. Stiefel Center for Trade Policy Studies, argued in July 2016 that the "failure of Congress to ratify the Trans-Pacific Partnership this year would do more to subvert U.S. regional and global interests than anything China is capable of doing." Stephen M. Walt, professor of international relations at Harvard University, writing after the Trump Administration abandoned the TPP, described the TPP as "a key institution that would have bound a number of Asian countries more tightly to the United States".

=== Non-TPP party opinions ===
On 30 January 2015 Philip Hammond, the former Foreign Secretary of the United Kingdom, described the Trans-Pacific Partnership and the Regional Comprehensive Economic Partnership as "potentially important liberalising steps forward".

The European Centre for International Political Economy (ECIPE), a think tank on European policies, predicted in 2012 that the TPP would be a "deadly threat to European exporters of agricultural products in TPP countries". ECIPE has said in 2014 that TPP "[would] be the first 'competing' economic integration that is large enough to have a considerable negative impact on Europe. In the long-term, the negative effects [would] come from dynamic impact, e.g. on investment, productivity and competitiveness". Pascal Lamy called the TPP "the last of big old-style trade agreements".

== Criticism ==
In 2014, Nobel Memorial Prize-winning economist Paul Krugman said "there isn't a compelling case for this deal, from either a global or a national point of view."

=== Currency manipulation ===
Some critics and even supporters of the TPP wanted the deal to contain measures that would crack down on nations who engage in alleged currency manipulation, notably China. However, Daniel Drezner, professor of international politics at Tufts University, has argued that the trade deal was never likely to include restrictions on currency manipulation, as it would have restricted U.S. monetary policy. Harvard economist Jeffrey Frankel has argued that the inclusion of currency manipulation language in TPP would be a mistake. Frankel noted that currency manipulation would be hard to enforce (in part because it is impossible to tell whether a currency is overvalued or undervalued); "currency manipulation" can often be legitimate; China, often alleged to be a major currency manipulator, is not party to the TPP; currency manipulation accusations are often meritless; and because it would restrict U.S. monetary policy.

=== Length and complexity ===
In his 2016 presidential campaign, then-candidate Donald Trump criticized the TPP agreement for being too long and complicated, saying "[i]t's 5,600 pages long, so complex that nobody's read it." Vermont U.S. Senator Bernie Sanders claimed that the "TPP is much more than a 'free trade' agreement."

However, Georgetown University Professor Marc L. Busch and McGill University Professor Krzysztof J. Pelc note that modern trade deals are long and complex because they often tackle non-tariff barriers to trade, such as different standards and regulations, in addition to tariffs. Due to steadily decreasing tariff barriers since WWII, countries have become increasingly likely to enact trade barriers in the form of non-tariff barriers. National firms often lobby their own governments to enact regulations that are designed to keep out foreign firms. The TPP addresses many of these "disguised restrictions on trade" by, for instance, "basing these measures on agreed-upon science; making the process of formulating regulations more transparent; and giving foreign exporters opportunities to offer substantive input in the formulation of these measures."

=== Secrecy of negotiations ===
Until being finalized, negotiations for the TPP were conducted with significant secrecy. Drafts of the agreement were kept classified during negotiations, and access to the working text was significantly restricted even for government officials, including the United States Congress; and business representatives involved in the talks. Despite this, some sections of TPP drafts were leaked to the public by WikiLeaks, which published an intellectual property chapter draft in 2013.

In 2012, critics such as Public Citizen's Global Trade Watch, a consumer advocacy group, called for more open negotiations in regard to the agreement. U.S. Trade Representative Ron Kirk responded that he believed the Office of the United States Trade Representative (USTR) conducted "the most engaged and transparent process as we possibly could", but that "some measure of discretion and confidentiality" are needed "to preserve negotiating strength and to encourage our partners to be willing to put issues on the table they may not otherwise." He dismissed the "tension" as natural and noted that when the Free Trade Area of the Americas drafts were released, negotiators were subsequently unable to reach a final agreement.

On 23 May 2012, U.S. Senator Ron Wyden, Democrat of Oregon, introduced S. 3225, which would have required the Office of the U.S. Trade Representative to disclose its TPP documents to all members of Congress. Had it passed, Wyden said that the bill would increase Congressional access to information about USTR activity.

Michael R. Wessel, former commissioner on the U.S. Trade Deficit Review Commission claimed in May 2015 that "cleared advisors" like himself were "prohibited from sharing publicly the criticisms we've lodged about specific proposals and approaches". He claimed that only portions of the text had been provided, "to be read under the watchful eye of a USTR official", that access on secure government-run website did not contain the most-up-to-date information, and that for cleared advisors to get that information, he had "to travel to certain government facilities and sign in to read the materials" and "even then, the administration determines what we can and cannot review and, often, they provide carefully edited summaries rather than the actual underlying text, which is critical to really understanding the consequences of the agreement."

In June 2015, U.S. Senator Rand Paul, Republican of Kentucky, opposed the bill to fast-track the congressional ratification of the TPP on the basis of the trade agreement's secrecy.

=== Indigenous rights ===
In late June 2015, several prominent Māori figures including Dr Papaarangi Reid, Moana Jackson, Rikirangi Gage, Angeline Greensill, Hone Harawira and Moana Maniapoto filed an urgent claim with the Waitangi Tribunal, a standing commission of inquiry established in 1975 to investigate the New Zealand Crown's breaches of the Treaty of Waitangi. The plaintiffs claimed that the way the New Zealand Government was negotiating the TPP breached the Treaty of Waitangi because its ratification would not require the consent of the New Zealand Parliament, the lack of Māori involvement in the negotiation process and the lack of any legal obligation to assess the TPP's implications for the Treaty of Waitangi. In response to the claim, the Government argued that the secret nature of the TPP negotiations would allow it to negotiate in the national interest, had taken steps to consider Māori interests under the Treaty and that it has been consulting with Māori in relation to the TPP. In early May 2016, the Waitangi Tribunal backed the inclusion of a Treaty of Waitangi clause in the finalised TPP trade deal. However, the Tribunal expressed concern that a clause allowing foreign investors to bring claims against the New Zealand Government could affect the Crown's willingness or ability to meet its Treaty obligations.

=== Industry influence ===
U.S. Senator Elizabeth Warren, Democrat of Massachusetts, has alleged that corporations and industry exert disproportionate influence on U.S. trade negotiators. She asserted in July 2016 that 85% of seats on U.S. trade advisory committees were held by "senior corporation executives or industry lobbyists", and that the members of the committees "whisper in the ear" of negotiators.

Michelle Ye Hee Lee, a fact-checker for The Washington Post, wrote that Warren used "misleading language" in describing the TPP. While Warren implied that "28 trade advisory committees were formed" specifically to influence the TPP, the advisory committees were actually created as part of the Trade Act of 1974; only the membership of the trade committees had changed during the Obama administration and the early phases of the TPP. Regarding Warren's claim that trade advisers secretly "whisper in the ear of our trade negotiators", Lee wrote: "while the direct meetings take place in private, committees still have to submit written reports to Congress and provide written recommendations and advice that are made public." Furthermore, Lee wrote, "it is true that industry representatives make up a large number of the total membership, but it is worth noting that there is a labor committee in the second tier, labor representatives in the first tier and that the industry groups have a narrow focus (to give technical advice)."

In response to criticisms about transparency and the large representation from industry representatives, USTR announced it would create a Public Interest Trade Advisory Committee.

In June 2026, after the Argentine government announced its intention to accede to the Trans-Pacific treaty, the Province of Buenos Aires, led by Governor Axel Kicillof, and in particular his chief of staff, Carlos Bianco, harshly criticized Argentina’s accession to the treaty, arguing that it imposes disadvantageous conditions on domestic industry (small and medium-sized enterprises, industrial employment, and domestic production) and that, with the United Kingdom as a member state of the treaty, it would jeopardize Argentina’s historic claim to sovereignty over the Falkland Islands.

=== Non-compete clause ===
Dean Baker argued that Article 18.78, under which countries should ensure that they protect trade secrets and impose criminal procedures for violators, could be used to enforce non-compete agreements. Baker points out that California's success can partly be attributed to the fact that the state did not allow for the enforcement of non-compete agreements, making it easy for tech workers to quit their jobs and start to work for another company.

=== Criticisms from politicians and activists ===
In 2014, linguist and political activist Noam Chomsky warned that the TPP is "designed to carry forward the neoliberal project to maximize profit and domination, and to set the working people in the world in competition with one another so as to lower wages to increase insecurity." Senator Bernie Sanders (I-VT) argues that trade agreements like the TPP "have ended up devastating working families and enriching large corporations." AFL-CIO head Richard Trumka criticized the trade deal.

== Corporate support ==
Several corporations publicly expressed support for the Trans-Pacific Partnership (TPP) during 2015 and 2016.

- AT&T
- Cargill
- Caterpillar
- Cisco
- Citigroup
- Dow Chemical Company
- FedEx
- Gap Inc.
- IBM
- Microsoft
- Qualcomm
- Target
- UPS
- Boeing
- Nike

== See also ==
- Association of Southeast Asian Nations
  - Regional Comprehensive Economic Partnership (RCEP - ASEAN plus 6)
- Combating Online Infringement and Counterfeits Act (COICA)
- Counterfeit
- Digital rights
- Trade Promotional Authority
- Foreign trade of the United States
- Forum of East Asia–Latin America Cooperation (FEALAC)
- Free trade
- Free trade area
- Generic drug
- Indo-Pacific Economic Framework (IPEF)
- Non-tariff barriers to trade
- Office of the United States Trade Representative
- Protect IP Act (PIPA)
- Stop Online Piracy Act (SOPA)
- Sustainable Development Goals (SDG)
- Tariff
- Trade in Services Agreement (TISA)
- Trans-Pacific Strategic Economic Partnership Agreement
- United States-Mexico-Canada Agreement (USMCA)
