= Mandy Price =

American attorney

- Education: University of Texas at Austin; Harvard Law School
- Occupations: Attorney, businessperson
- Known for: Founder and CEO of Kanarys

Mandy Price is an American attorney and businessperson. She co-founded the tech platform Kanarys, which helps companies better achieve their diversity, equity, and inclusion goals, and served as the company's first CEO.

== Early life and education ==
Price grew up in DeSoto, Texas, a suburb of Dallas., graduating from DeSoto High School. Price was the only Black student in her kindergarten class, and she cites learning about race-based prejudices in high school due to her classmates viewed her differently since their prejudices were "dissolved through real connection".

Price graduated from the University of Texas at Austin and earned her law degree from Harvard Law School. While at Harvard, she worked for both the Harvard Civil Rights-Civil Liberties Law Review and the Innocence Project.

== Career ==
After graduating from law school, Price joined a law firm as a private equity lawyer. Working as a partner, Price recalls having to "ignore microaggressions while helping others navigate similar inequitable corporate issues". In 2019, she resigned from her law firm and founded Kanarys with Star Carter, a law school colleague. As a technology platform, Kanarys analyzes a company's internal data to expose equity issues and assess how well a company is doing against its stated DEI goals. Acknowledging that DEI is often related to personal experiences, Price and Carter cite the use of key performance indicators to provide objective data that a company can better act upon.

In 2021, Price helped to raise over $1M in venture capital funding for Kanarys, one of 93 Black female founders to do so in that year. In 2023, she helped raise over $10M in funding, one of fewer than 20 Black female founders to do so. Kanarys served clients such as 7-Eleven, Silicon Labs, and Yum! Brands.

Price exited Kanarys in 2024 and joined Draper Richards Kaplan Foundation, a nonprofit investment foundation.
