= Wenonah Hauter =

Environmental author

- Born: May 9, 1954 (age 72); United States
- Occupations: Organizer, author

Wenonah Hauter (born May 9, 1954) is an environmental organizer and environmental writer as the author of two books. Hauter currently serves as the executive director of Food & Water Watch, a non-governmental organization which she founded.

== Early life and education ==
At the age of 11, Hauter's family moved to a farm in Virginia, where they lived in poverty. Her worldview was shaped by the pressing issues of the day—the Vietnam War, the Civil Rights and Women's movements.

Hauter initially attended community college before transferring to James Madison University, where she graduated with a bachelor's degree in sociology. She later studied at the University of Maryland where she received a Masters in Applied Anthropology.

== Activism ==
In the early 1990s Hauter worked as a senior organizer at the Union of Concerned Scientists, coordinating sustainable energy campaigns in the Midwest and opposing the deregulation of electric utilities. After leaving Union of Concerned Scientists, she worked at Citizen Action as Environmental Program Director, during her tenure Citizen Action joined a coalition which outlined a "POWER FOR THE PEOPLE" plan. This blueprint encouraged increased competition in the electric utility sector, as well as state control of transmission lines and larger renewable energy portfolios.

She later became the director of Public Citizen's Critical Mass Energy Program, which fought for food and energy policy reform and against water privatization. During her work with Public Citizen, Hauter called for the shutdown of the Salem Nuclear Power Plant, highlighting its history of safety violations and resulting fines.

Her work with Public Citizen formed the foundation for Food & Water Watch, which she left Public Citizen to found in 2005. In founding the organization, she sought to foster organizing around the country with a focus on moving people to action on issue of food and water. Energy would later also become a major focus of the organization. She has been critical of genetically modified food, highlighting the possibility of unintended effects of the technology.

In 2012 she was recognized as a Food Hero by Vegetarian Times as someone "dedicated to organizing the grassroots on big-picture issues that affect the natural world and people's health". Food Tank recognized her as a woman who is “inspiring others and creating a better food system around the world.”

Hauter was strongly critical of the environmental policy of the Donald Trump administration.

== Bull Run Mountain Farm ==
Wenonah Hauter and her husband Leigh are the owners of the Bull Run Mountain Farm in Fauquier County, Virginia. Situated on land originally purchased in the 1960s by Wenonah's father, William Bates, the farm is now run as a community-supported agriculture (CSA) enterprise. Starting in the 1990s, the land was the subject of a complex legal dispute between the county, the Hauters (who owned eighty percent of the property), the Virginia Outdoors Foundation (which owned the other twenty percent), and the Hauters' neighbor Lavina Currier. The dispute, which involved land ownership, back taxes, and property boundaries, was finally settled in 2005. The property lines were again amended in 2009.

== Books ==
Frackopoly: The Battle for the Future of Energy and the Environment (2016) chronicles the history of the energy policy that regulated the development of fracking, arguing that great leniency was given to the oil and gas industry. The book also documents recent movements against the fossil fuel industry, including a detailed case study of the successful campaign to ban fracking in New York and the Standing Rock Sioux protests of the Dakota Access Pipeline.

Foodopoly: The Battle Over the Future of Food and Farming in America (2012) is an exploration of the effect of corporate consolidation on farming and food in the United States. In the book, Hauter criticizes factory farming and catalogs how mergers in the agricultural industry have changed food consumption and production.
