= The Nader Report on the Federal Trade Commission =

1970 book by Edward F. Cox

- Author: Edward F. Cox, Robert C. Fellmeth, John E. Schulz
- Language: English
- Publication date: 1970
- Publication place: United States

This report ("The Nader Report") is the result of a student task force exploration of the Federal Trade Commission (FTC), completed over the course of a summer job led by Ralph Nader. The seven law student volunteers (dubbed "Nader's Raiders" by the Washington press corps) began their evaluation of the FTC in June 1968 and published a revised and expanded version of the report as a book in January 1969.

The report covers: The general material about which the FTC should be concerned ("The Crisis"—advertising, deception, targeting the poor, etc.); The reasons for the ineffectiveness of the FTC ("The Failures"—poor prioritization, delays, inaction, etc.); How the FTC was able to evade scrutiny ("The Mask"—deceptive public relations, secrecy, ties to industry and powerful political figures); The responsibility and effect of the leadership ("The Cancer"—partisan politics, hiring practices, etc.); and the recommended solutions to these problems ("The Cure").

== Summary ==
The report was based on the FTC as it was in the 1960s. During this time, the FTC was under scrutiny for major weaknesses. One year after the Nader Report was published, the ABA Commission to Study the FTC also issued a report criticizing the FTC, exploring whether or not the FTC should be abolished.

The main arguments of the Nader Report were:

- The FTC is ineffective.
- The FTC is passive about its duties, is not proactive about discovering violations, delays actions to an unreasonable extent, and has ineffective enforcement practices.
- The FTC should prioritize problems that have a high area of impact (e.g., many potential victims, particularly vulnerable victims, extraordinary cost to the victims).
- The FTC needs to improve detection of such problems, particularly through direct grassroots involvement and active investigation.
- The FTC needs to resolve the fundamental process and power issues that prevent it from taking action in a timely manner.
- The FTC should not be a "friend" to business; it needs to be feared, and it needs to provide strong disincentives to businesses for committing violations.
- The FTC should not be able to hide behind secrecy and powerful political and business relationships.

== Nader's Raiders ==
- Edward F. Cox
- Robert C. Fellmeth
- John E. Schulz
- Judy Areen
- Peter A. Bradford
- Andrew Egendorf
- William Taft IV

Seven law students embedded themselves at the FTC during the summer of 1968, and conducted their study first-hand. "We were dealt with as members of the general public—not as litigants, businessmen, members of Congress, or representatives of the White House."

== The Report ==
=== The Crisis ===
The authors focus on what they believe to comprise the domain of interest for the FTC, namely the "unfair methods of competition in commerce, and unfair or deceptive acts or practices in commerce."

They discuss trends in advertising, including: targeted advertising and product marketing; suggestive advertising; deceptive claims; price fixing and price leadership; and directly targeting vulnerable consumers. A common trend discussed is that of businesses either directly deceiving the consumer, or diverting his attention away from unappealing information, such as side-effects of using a particular product (since it is only through advertising that the consumer learns about the product).

Particular focus is given to the practices that target those who are desperate or those who do not have the means to help themselves once they discover they have been deceived. Some examples are of aggressive marketing of credit lines or financing to poor families, pyramid schemes, fruitless "get rich quick" schemes that involve an expensive buy-in (such as buying chinchillas to breed, expecting to sell their fur at a great profit, only to have the animals die or ultimately be unable to sell the fur at the promised rates), and the aggressive marketing of expensive home-improvement material to poor families (wherein the contract includes a confiscation clause, resulting in a large financial penalty or even loss of the home).

The general claim is that the FTC cannot only rely on the consumer to notify it of problems:

- The consumer might not be aware of the problems to begin with (e.g., if a side-effect surfaces much later, or through the use of deceptive advertising).
- The victim might be poor or elderly or otherwise restricted in ability to determine in a timely fashion that he or she is being treated unfairly.
- Or further, the consumer might not have any awareness of price fixing or high profit margins on products.

=== The Failures ===
The task force criticized the FTC of being ineffective. Namely, the report focused on the FTC's failure to:

1. "detect violations systematically"
2. "establish efficient priorities for its enforcement energy"
3. "enforce the powers it has with energy and speed"
4. "seek sufficient statutory authority to make its work effective."

==== Detection ====
In the first case, the FTC's reliance on consumer-originated notification is criticized as being insufficiently effective at uncovering problems of consumer deception. For example, the authors suggest that "there must be alert and extensive monitoring operations with pre-screening by expert engineers, doctors and other professionals" in order to discover deception in TV commercials.

==== Prioritization ====
Second, the report asserts that the FTC prioritized its investigations, for example, preferring those that concern Washington and its Congressmen. The authors argue that preference should be given to cases wherein the violations "endanger health and physical safety", those that predominantly affect the poor, or those that affect a large number of victims.

The authors explored how the FTC dealt with flammable fabrics. In one case, they found that 13 years has passed between the passing of the Flammable Fabrics Act and the first civil penalty action. In another case, the FTC blocked the further importation of a shipment of flammable rayon fabric, but did not recall the already-distributed fabric from the same shipment.

Regarding helping the poor: Despite being an FTC program that targeted violations in poor neighborhoods, the authors found that in analyzing the 1965 FTC Report on District of Columbia Consumer Protection Program (the "D.C. Study"), very few complaints were ultimately addressed, and the FTC did not use its ability for rigorously fining violators.

Lastly, the authors criticized the FTC for being reluctant to "go after" big companies (due to fear of their powerful legal teams, or through direct corporate or legal pressure), noting that of the vast majority of companies involved in litigated cases were small companies.

==== Enforcement ====
The authors note the FTC's increased reliance on "voluntary" enforcement methods, as well as excessive delays when enforcement was due. The report details as well the decrease in the number of investigations over the years, and the low risk of formal action (one in 35 applications for complaint resulted in requests for "voluntary compliance", and one in 125 resulted in formal action).

Voluntary enforcement methods are criticized as ineffective due to the lack of incentive for a business to comply. For example, not only is a business able to get away with violations until the first cease and desist, the business might be able to continue doing so beyond the first cease and desist. The authors assert that without harsh penalty for subsequent violations, or a strong altruistic nature in businessmen, this method is ineffective. "Rather than bite down hard on the violators, the agency prefers a toothless attempt to gum them to death." The report found many instances where the FTC could have enforced heavy civil penalties or brought criminal action, but did not. Similarly, the FTC "almost never" sought preliminary injunctions in order to halt challenged activities while under review.

The authors also argue that the FTC must most importantly deter businessmen from attempting fraud, rather than merely creating consumer awareness programs and punishing businesses after they have broken the law.

Additionally, the report evaluated delays in investigation and enforcement (even of requesting voluntary enforcement). One example offered was of Collier's Encyclopedia, wherein it took the FTC nine years to issue a cease and desist order. Other examples include a case that was closed because the papers were lost, a case for which evidence was invalidated due to the statute of limitations, and examples of delays in regulation of deception by Firestone tire advertisements, cigarette advertisements, deceptive vehicle warranties, and the marketing of old cars as new by Volkswagen.

==== Resources & Authority ====
The report also discusses the FTC's need for increased resources, including the FTC's request for increased budget and more personnel, and suggesting additional enforcement powers, such as "the power to seek criminal penalties for certain violations and the power to seek preliminary injunctions in appropriate cases" (The authors claim that the FTC had either not sought new powers or weakly applied whatever enforcement powers it had).

=== The Mask ===
In this section of the report, the authors explore the public-facing side of the FTC, particularly its seemingly flawless public relations and the FTC's strong desire for secrecy; and make claims that the FTC was in collusion with business interests.

The report asserts that the FTC made false claims about effective detection, efficient enforcement, and its priority policies. In addition to detailing the false claims, the authors found the FTC attempted to improve its image by declaring problem areas as "under study", making action on easy and visible projects, or only reporting favorable statistics regarding the FTC's successes.

The report focuses considerably on secrecy within the FTC, even flatly stating: "the FTC's official policy regarding what is and is not confidential, as set forth in its rules of procedure, is in blatant conflict with the Freedom of Information Act." Examples are given of public documents being made available in single copy, unannounced, for only 30 days, in one office; limited copies of transcripts of public hearings; text being only released in abridged form; and so on.

In defending its secrecy, the FTC cited protection of trade secrets (giving as an example the prolonged struggle with Professor Kenneth Davis from the University of Chicago), "internal communications", and investigatory files under FOIA. The report claimed that the FTC used over-broad interpretations of these exemptions and that the FTC would liberally define their information in order to evade the Freedom of Information Act.

The task force also explores the FTC's collusion with big business interests. One example was of the chief of the Division of General Trade Restraints having a positive reputation in the retail gas dealers' trade association for "immediately investigating independent dealers for 'price discrimination' when they lower prices below the established level for their market." A more subtle issue is of over-exposure to businessmen and related legal interests: "Long, amicable exposure to those they are supposed to regulate has given them a perspective more sympathetic to business interests than to consumers. The FTC, in effect, becomes the very thing it is designed to regulate."

Lastly, the task force cites examples of businesses treating the FTC with outright disdain, such as taking advantage of the FTC's expected delays in processing or the Commission's more lax advisory opinions in order to evade more stringent policies elsewhere (such as with the National Association of Broadcasters).

=== The Cancer ===
The report very harshly attacks the leadership and organization of the FTC, claiming that the "real problem of the FTC ... can ... be traced to people."

The staffing problems listed in the report covered many forms of discrimination and preferential treatment:

- Party discrimination—At the time of the report, 40 of 500 lawyers working for the FTC were Republicans, with only one holding a high position. Chairman Dixon was also accused of coercing employees to donate to the Democratic National Committee against their will.
- Preferential treatment due to political ties—Several examples were given of political influence: Congressmen were given preferential expedited responses from the FTC; great career advances, favored positions, and high salaries would be achieved only with strong political connections; and one Congressman was able to have an entire (mostly unknown) FTC office created in Oak Ridge, TN for the benefit of a political friend.
- Preference for employees from southern states—The report focuses considerably on hiring practices at the FTC, including the preference for hiring people from southern law schools, citing that graduates from southern schools were accepted two to one over graduates from northern schools (Applicant acceptance rates for graduates from the given states: New York 22%, Massachusetts 31%, Tennessee 52%, Texas 53%), and an apparent trend to favor people from Tennessee in particular.
- Racial discrimination—In general, African-Americans were under-represented (5 employees in the GS 9-18 grades) and recruiting for equal opportunity was not done.
- Enmeshed "old-timers"—For example, in the Office of the General Counsel, of 32 attorneys: 22 were GS 15 or higher, five were GS-14, three were GS-13, one was GS-11, and one was GS-9, meaning that most attorneys had been employed at the FTC for a very long time. The task force provided anecdotal evidence of consistently hard-to-find attorneys (including the General Counsel), a highly paid attorney discovered sleeping on the job with very little evidence of actual work, and so on. Additionally, most (80%) young lawyers left the FTC within four years (due to job opportunity, frustration at the inefficacy of the Commission, or frustration at the busywork they were assigned).
- Lack of diversity (too many from small-town backgrounds)—The task force evaluated the Commission's hierarchy of employees that decides priorities, selects cases for investigation, etc., and found most of the powerful and influential people came from small southern towns. Of the 15 available biographies of the 35 assistant bureau chiefs and division chiefs, 9 had small southern town backgrounds. The authors argue that there needed to be more representation from people of more diverse areas, claiming that some delay in action was due to this lack of social diversity: "Such action, however, would have required social concern, imagination, and foresight--the very qualities inhibited in a group of people lacking diversity."
- Lack of domain expertise—"[L]egal competence alone is often not enough for the job." The report asserts that subject-matter experts such as engineers and doctors are increasingly necessary in order to discover deceptive practices.

=== The Cures ===
Lastly, the task force presents their recommendations for addressing the problems within the FTC.

==== Detection ====
- Mobilize efforts on a task-force scale
- Hold related and frequent public hearings
- Pressure other government agencies to divulge information of interest to consumers
- Directly address problems affecting poor areas
- Be more visible to all social classes
- Establish field offices where they are needed (and close the Oak Ridge, TN office)
- Require advertisers to substantiate claims
- Improve the public complaint system (e.g., allow consumers to sue for treble damages)
- Improve consumer education

==== Prioritization ====
- Prioritize only the most important cases
- Hire a Program Review Officer

==== Enforcement ====
- Reduce reliance on voluntary methods of enforcement
- When voluntary methods are used, enforce compliance more stringently
- Use civil penalties and suits for preliminary injunctions and criminal penalties more frequently
- Begin a program of periodic compliance checks on outstanding cease and desist orders and punish noncompliers harshly
- Reduce delays, and never let investigations disappear
- Leverage the threat of bad publicity against businesses

==== Resources & Authority ====
- The FTC needs authority to seek preliminary injunctions and criminal penalties
- Make clear the FTC's power in intrastate matters
- Seek "baby FTC Acts" to increase law enforcement for consumer protection
- Use publicity to gain consumer support

==== Secrecy ====
- The FTC should conform to the requirements of the FOIA
- Public logs should be kept of conferences between businessmen and the FTC
- Public information should be made public, e.g., with more informative news releases
- Recognize that the public has equal right to information as members of Congress or big businesses
- Be examined by the Congressional watchdog committees

==== Staffing ====
- Hire from the top law schools
- Interview from the middle (instead of from the highest grade)
- Hire technical experts, even at the cost of lawyers
- Hire minorities
- Reduce high-level attorneys whose jobs do not match their pay
- Chairman Dixon should resign

== Impact ==
The release of the Nader Report resulted in an evaluation by the American Bar Association, which looked at entirely abolishing the FTC. The ABA study decided against abolishing the FTC, and the FTC has since improved.

Since at least the publication of the Nader's Raiders' 'expose'

and the American Bar Association's critique, the 1960s has been regarded by many as a decade of trivial pursuits for the Federal Trade Commission. The Commission's reputation for chasing small-time con artists, challenging inconsequential business practices, turning a blind eye to politically connected corporations, and doing it all with a lethargy that exemplified popular notions of bureaucratic inertia, earned it the ridicule of

consumer activists and the disdain of the regulatory bar.

Following the ABA's report, Nixon revitalized the agency and sent it on a path of vigorous consumer protection and antitrust enforcement for the rest of the 1970s. The FTC's regulatory empowerment following the Nader and ABA reports posed drastic changes for U.S. businesses and the advertising industry. In 1977, the FTC approved rule making to significantly restrict advertising to children. By 1980, the FTC's regulatory renaissance came to a halt when Congress shut the agency down, forcing into law measures to restrict the FTC's powers
