= Global Trade Watch =

American nonprofit advocacy group

- Founded: 1995; 31 years ago
- Type: Consumer advocacy non-profit
- Purpose: International Trade
- Location: Washington D.C., United States
- Region served: Global
- Method: Research, lobbying, litigation and appeals, media attention, direct-appeal campaigns
- Director: Melinda St. Louis
- Key people: Lori Wallach (founder)
- Parent organization: Public Citizen
- Revenue: $15.468 million
- Website: www.citizen.org/trade

Global Trade Watch (GTW) is a left-leaning consumer advocacy organization that focuses on trade policy. Founded in 1995 by attorney Lori Wallach, GTW is a division of U.S.-based think tank Public Citizen. GTW advocates for a greater public role in international, federal, state and local policy-making, and for a different set of policies and institutions than those governing the current model of globalization. In 2022, Melinda St. Louis succeeded Wallach as director of GTW.

The GTW monitors the World Trade Organization (WTO) and other trade agreements such as the North American Free Trade Agreement (NAFTA) and the Central America Free Trade Agreement (CAFTA), as well as ongoing negotiations over trade agreements such as the Trans-Pacific Partnership (TPP) and the Trans-Atlantic Free Trade Agreement (TAFTA / TTIP).

== Founding and activities ==
Lori Wallach, GTW's Director and Founder was described as "Ralph Nader with a sense of humor" in a Wall Street Journal profile, dubbed "the Trade Debate's Guerrilla Warrior" by the National Journal, the "Madame Defarge of Seattle" by the Institute for International Economics, and "a key player in Washington debates on trade policy" by The Nation. Wallach is a graduate of Harvard University and previously worked for Public Citizen as a lobbyist for food safety improvements.

Alongside organizations such as the AFL–CIO and the Sierra Club, the GTW urged General Electric to cease offshoring jobs from the United States and invest in renewable energy. Global Trade Watch holds a position on the executive board of the Citizens Trade Campaign and belongs to Our World Is Not For Sale.

== Archives ==
- World Trade Organization 1999 Seattle Ministerial Conference Protest Collection 1993-2000. 43.63 cubic feet. At the Labor Archives of Washington, University of Washington Libraries Special Collections.
