= Public Citizen =

Government watchdog and progressive advocacy group

Public Citizen Inc. Public Citizen Foundation

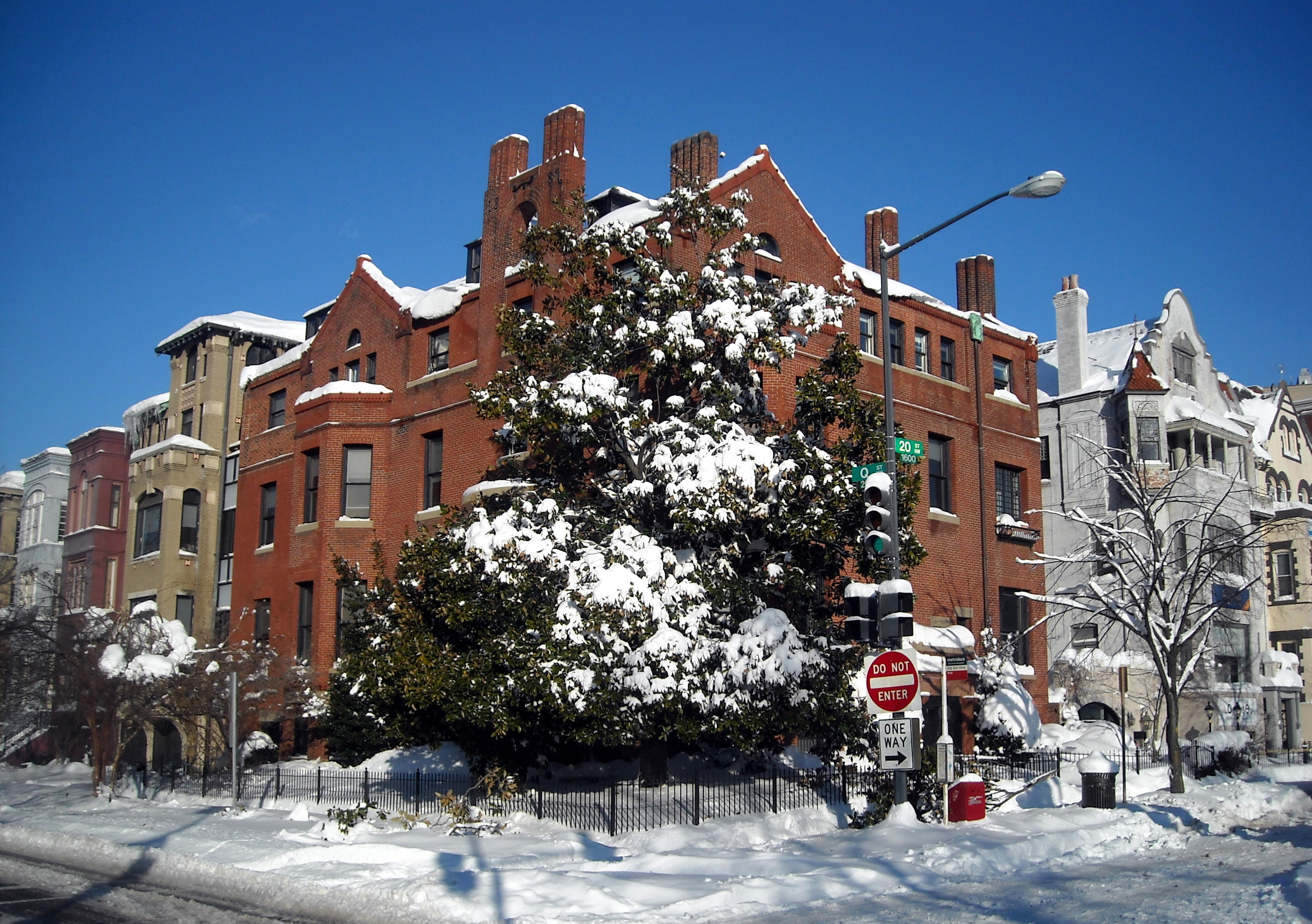
- Public Citizen's headquarters in Washington, D.C.
- Founded: 1971; 55 years ago
- Founder: Ralph Nader
- Type: Think tank
- Purpose: Consumer advocacy
- Location: Washington, D.C.
- Region served: Nationwide (US)
- Method: Research, lobbying, litigation and appeals, media attention, direct-appeal campaigns
- Key people: Lisa Gilbert (co-president); Robert Weissman (co-president); Mark A. Chavez (foundation chair); Jason Adkins (inc. chair); Joan Claybrook (President emeritus)
- Revenue: $19,904,796 (2024)
- Website: www.citizen.org

Wordmark

Public Citizen is an American non-profit, progressive government watchdog and consumer rights advocacy group and think tank based in Washington, D.C. It was founded in 1971 by the American activist and lawyer Ralph Nader.

== Lobbying efforts ==
Its five divisions include Congress Watch; Energy; Global Trade Watch; the Health Research Group; and Public Citizen Litigation Group.

Among other issues, Public Citizen has been a public voice on drug pricing. For example, they advocated for Gilead Sciences to test GS-441524, a cheaper alternative to remdesivir.

== Activism ==
Public Citizen has also been active organizing rallies and other actions in support of democracy and seeking to reduce the influence of money on politics. In 2012 they helped to organize a week-long event in Washington, D.C., to educate, raise awareness and seek support for efforts to pass a Constitutional amendment to overturn the Supreme Court's Citizens United decision. They have worked successfully to get state legislatures to call for Citizens United to be overturned. In 2025, they helped organize over 2,000 No Kings protests across the United States.

== History ==
In 1968, Nader recruited seven volunteer law students, dubbed "Nader's Raiders" by the Washington press corps, to evaluate the efficacy and operation of the Federal Trade Commission (FTC). The group's ensuing report, which criticized the body as "ineffective" and "passive" led to an American Bar Association investigation of the FTC. Based on the results of that second study, Richard Nixon revitalized the agency and sent it on a path of vigorous consumer protection and antitrust enforcement for the rest of the 1970s.

Nader's Raiders became involved in such issues as nuclear safety, international trade, regulation of insecticides, meat processing, pension reform, land use, and banking.

Following the publication of the report, Nader founded Public Citizen in 1971 to engage in public interest lobbying and activism on issues of consumer rights. He served on its board of directors until 1980.

In the aftermath of Ralph Nader's 2000 presidential campaign, Public Citizen disassociated itself from Nader. A 2001 article in the progressive magazine Mother Jones reported that Nader's association with Public Citizen was causing fundraising problems. The article cited a letter Public Citizen wrote to its members in which it disclaimed an association with Nader: "Although Ralph Nader was our founder, he has not held an official position in the organization since 1980 and does not serve on the board. Public Citizen — and the other groups that Mr. Nader founded — act independently."

== People associated with Public Citizen ==
- Ralph Nader, founder
- Alan Morrison, co-founder
- Joan Claybrook, first executive director
- Lisa Gilbert, current co-president
- Robert Weissman, current co-president
- Donna Edwards, former U.S. Representative
- Mark Green, former New York City Public Advocate
- Wenonah Hauter, executive director, Food & Water Watch
- Paul Alan Levy, litigator on labor and free speech issues
- Peter Maybarduk, director, Access to Medicines
- Phil Radford, former organizer, Global Trade Watch
- Melinda St. Louis, director, Global Trade Watch
- Lori Wallach, founder, Global Trade Watch
- Sidney M. Wolfe, director, Health Research Group

== See also ==
- Consumer Project on Technology
- Food & Water Watch
- Anti-nuclear movement in the United States
