= Joan Claybrook =

American lawyer and lobbyist

- Born: June 12, 1937 (age 89); Baltimore, Maryland, U.S.
- Education: Goucher College (BA); Georgetown University (JD)
- Occupations: Attorney; Lobbyist
- Known for: Public Citizen

Joan Buckler Claybrook (born June 12, 1937) is an American lawyer and lobbyist who was president of Public Citizen from 1982 to 2009. She also served in the Carter administration as head of the National Highway Traffic Safety Administration (NHTSA) from 1977 to 1981.

== Early life, education, and early career ==
Claybrook was born and raised in Baltimore, Maryland. She attended Goucher College, graduating with a bachelor's degree in 1959. In 1973, she earned a J.D. degree from Georgetown University Law Center. Between college and law school, she worked in the congressional liaison's office at the Social Security Administration for six years before moving to Washington, D.C., in 1965 to complete a fellowship with the American Political Science Association. She also briefly worked as a staffer for Senator Walter F. Mondale.

== Career ==
In 1977, Claybrook was appointed by President Jimmy Carter to head the then 10-year-old National Highway Traffic Safety Administration. Prior to her time with NHTSA, Claybrook ran Congress Watch, worked for the Public Interest Research Group (PIRG), the National Traffic Safety Bureau, the Social Security Administration, the Department of Health, Education, and Welfare. During her early years in Washington, D.C., she met Ralph Nader while advocating for improving highway and auto safety. In 1966, she lobbied with Nader for the successful passage of the nation's first auto safety laws: the National Traffic and Motor Vehicle Safety Act and the Highway Safety Act. She was also involved in efforts for stricter automobile regulations. Some of these rules, such as her mandate that speedometers read no higher than 85 miles per hour, proved unpopular with U.S. car owners and were later overturned. Claybrook was also a prominent advocate for the use of airbags in automobiles.

== Board service ==
Claybrook currently serves on Georgetown University Law Center's board of visitors. She also holds positions on the boards of Consumers Union, Citizens for Tax Justice, Public Justice, Advocates for Highway and Auto Safety, the Goucher College board of trustees, and the California Wellness Foundation advisory board.
