= Winsted Hosiery Mill =

- U.S. National Register of Historic Places
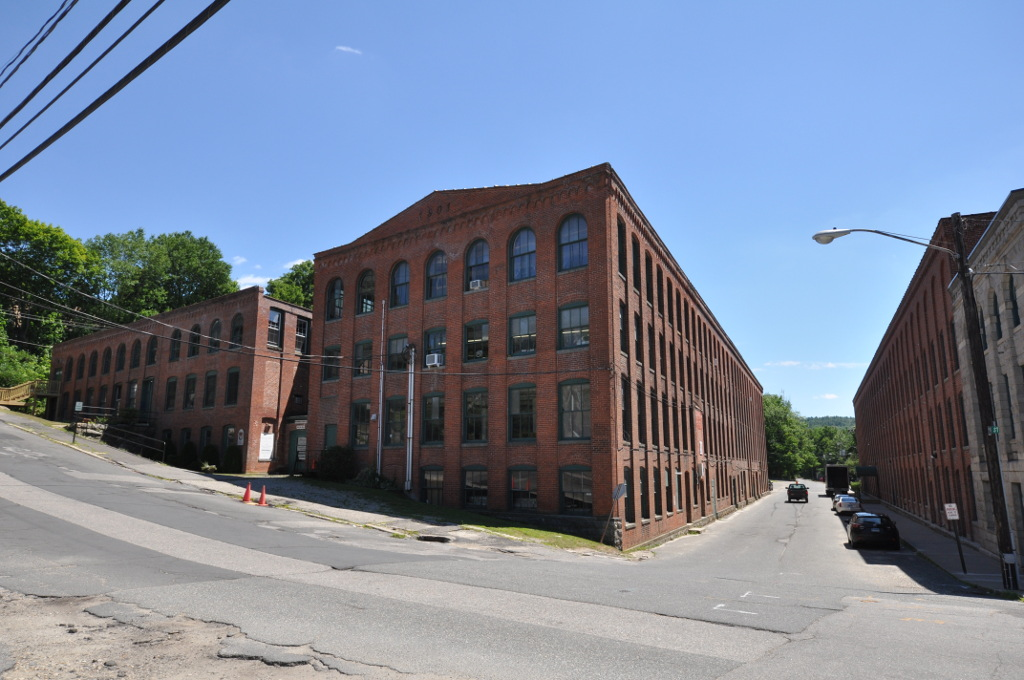

- Location within Connecticut Location within the United States
- Location: Whiting at Holabird Street, Winsted, Connecticut
- Coordinates: 41°55′24″N 73°3′32″W
- Area: 4.4 acres (1.8 ha)
- Built: 1901
- Architectural style: Italianate, Romanesque
- NRHP reference No.: 85000308
- Added to NRHP: February 21, 1985

The Winsted Hosiery Mill, also known as the Whiting Mill, is an industrial complex at 210 Holabird Street in the Winsted section of Winchester, Connecticut. Developed in the late 19th and early 20th centuries, it was one of the largest industrial employers in the community for many years, and is relatively unaltered from its period of development. It was listed on the National Register of Historic Places in 1985. It is now subdivided for multiple industrial and commercial tenants.

== Description and history ==
The former Winsted Hosiery Mill complex is located north of Winsted's commercial downtown, on the east side of the Still River and the south side of Holabird Avenue. The complex has six buildings, and is roughly divided in half by Whiting Street, which parallels the river. Five of them are of brick construction, and one is of stone. The stone building, which housed the mill offices, is located at the corner of Holabird and Whiting, with a long and narrow brick building extending to the south. Across Whiting Street is another large building, with smaller structures attached and standing detached nearby.

The Winsted Hosiery Company was founded in 1882 by William L. Gilbert, producing hosiery and underwear for men made from cotton-wool blends. Its original mill building burned down in 1900, after which the company embarked on a ten-year construction program that resulted in the present complex. The company experienced significant growth until about 1935, and saw declining employment during World War II. In the 1950s it shifted to the production of woolen garments. In 1965 the company, then known as the Winchester Spinning Company, moved its operations to more modern facilities in North Carolina.

== Current Uses ==
The Winsted Hosiery Mill complex is now best known as Whiting Mills, which houses the Whiting Mills art studios and the American Mural Project, which is a nonprofit arts and education center in an adjacent renovated mill building. Both organizations hold events and education programs.

== See also ==
- National Register of Historic Places listings in Litchfield County, Connecticut
