= West End Commercial District (Winsted, Connecticut) =

- U.S. National Register of Historic Places
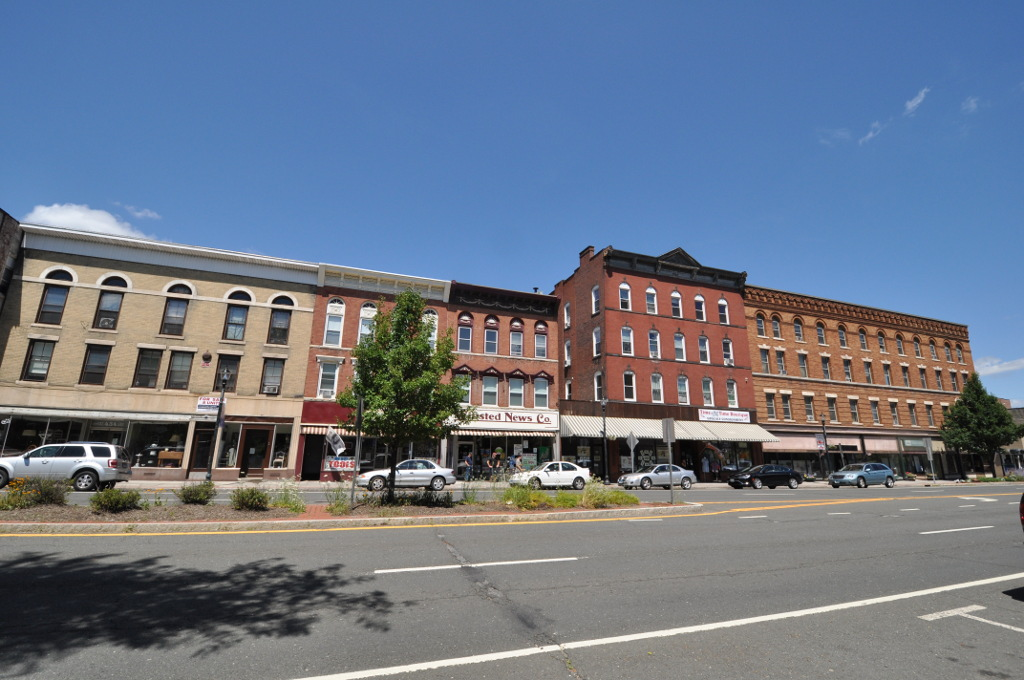
- The East Side of the District

- Location within Connecticut Location within the United States
- Location: North Side of Main Street United States Route 44 between Union and Elm Streets, Winsted, Connecticut
- Coordinates: 41°55′15″N 73°4′18″W
- Area: 1.5 acres (0.61 ha)
- Architectural style: Late 19th And 20th Century Revivals, Late Victorian
- NRHP reference No.: 90001148
- Added to NRHP: August 3, 1990

The West End Commercial District encompasses a single city block of commercial buildings in Winsted, Connecticut. The block, consisting of the North Side of Main Street United States Route 44 between Union and Elm Streets, is the city's largest grouping of late-19th and early-20th century commercial buildings to survive flooding and redevelopment. It was listed on the National Register of Historic Places in 1990.

== Description and history ==
Winsted's West End commercial block consists of eight buildings lining the North Side of Main Street (United States Route 44) between Union and Elm Streets. All have primarily brick facades and are between two and four stories in height. Architectural elements are generally of commercial Italianate or Romanesque style, and all of the buildings have projecting decorative cornices. The ground floor storefronts have generally been modernized, although some original details are still visible. There is only one non-contributing building, a small single-story structure built as infill into one of the two alleys on the block.

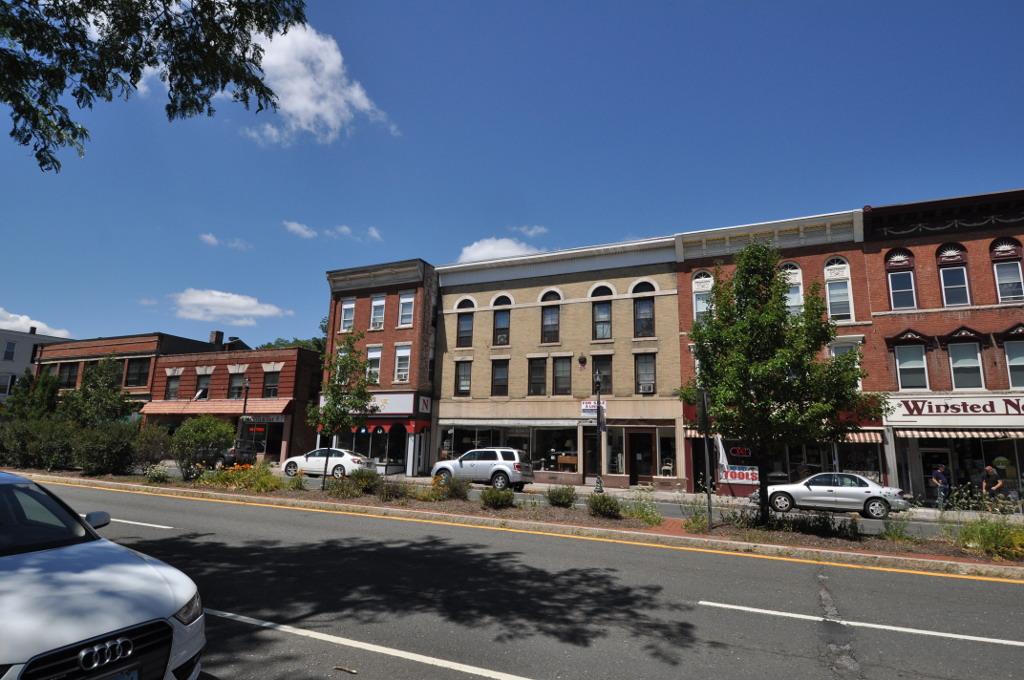
The west side of the district

Winsted's commercial and industrial buildings of the late 19th century once lined both sides of Main Street. The buildings on the south side of the road were swept away during devastating flooding in 1955, and the city decided to widen the road rather rebuild. The city had developed beginning with the arrival of the railroad in 1849, and rapidly grew as an urban industrial center, gaining a measure of independence as an independent borough of Winchester in 1858. The largest building in the West End, the Winchester Hotel, was built in 1898 to replace an older hotel.

== See also ==
- National Register of Historic Places listings in Litchfield County, Connecticut
