= Winchester Public Schools =

Winchester Public Schools may refer to:

- Winchester Public Schools (Connecticut)
- Winchester Public Schools (Virginia)
