= Winchester, Connecticut =

- Town
- Town of Winchester
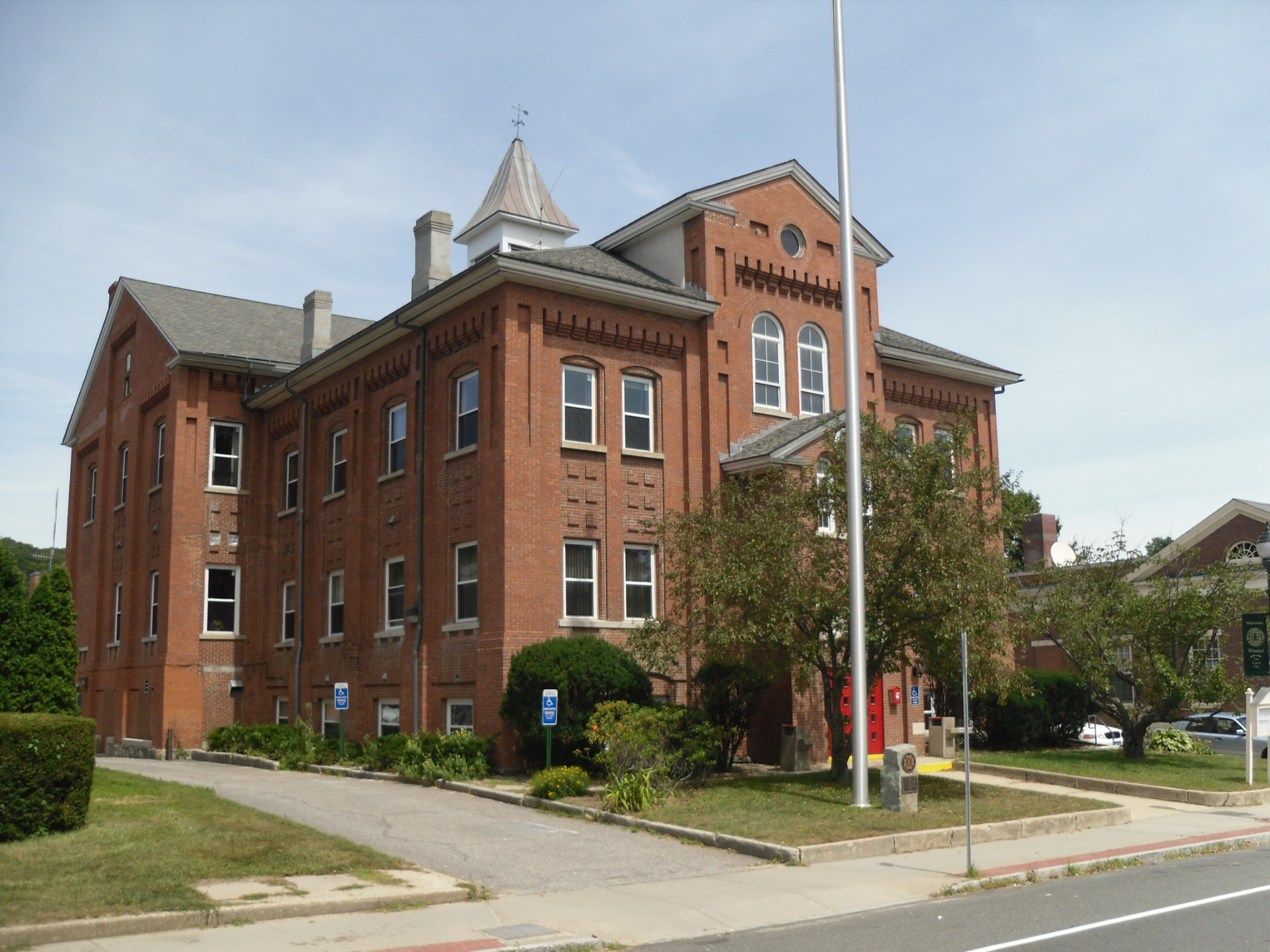
- Winchester Town Hall

- Seal

- Coordinates: 41°55′30″N 73°06′11″W
- Country: United States
- U.S. state: Connecticut
- County: Litchfield
- Region: Northwest Hills
- Incorporated: 1771

Government
  - Type: Board of Selectmen - Town Manager
  - Town Manager/CEO: Paul Harrington
  - Board of Selectmen: Todd Arcelaschi (R), Mayor; William Hester (R); Troy Lamere (R); Paul Marino (R); Althea C. Perez (D); William Pozzo (R); Linda Groppo (D)

Area
  - Total: 33.8 sq mi (87.6 km^{2})
  - Land: 32.5 sq mi (84.2 km^{2})
  - Water: 1.3 sq mi (3.4 km^{2})
- Elevation: 1,020 ft (310 m)

Population (2020)
  - Total: 10,224
  - Density: 314/sq mi (121.4/km^{2})
- Time zone: UTC-5 (Eastern)
  - Summer (DST): UTC-4 (Eastern)
- ZIP codes: 06094, 06098
- Area codes: 860/959
- FIPS code: 09-86440
- GNIS feature ID: 0213536
- Website: www.townofwinchester.org

Winchester is a town in Litchfield County, Connecticut, United States. The population was 10,224 at the 2020 census. The city of Winsted is located in Winchester. The town is part of the Northwest Hills Planning Region.

== History ==
Winchester was incorporated on May 21, 1771, and named after Winchester in England.

== Geography ==
The town is in northeastern Litchfield County and is bordered to the south by the city of Torrington. It is 28 miles (45 km) northwest of Hartford, the state capital, and 27 miles (43 km) north of Waterbury. Winsted, with a population of 7,321 by far the largest community in Winchester, is in the eastern part of the town.

According to the United States Census Bureau, the town has a total area of 33.8 square miles (87.6 km^{2}), of which 32.5 square miles (84.2 km^{2}) are land and 1.3 square miles (3.4 km^{2}), or 3.87%, are water. Highland Lake, Crystal Lake, and Winchester Lake are three of the larger water bodies in the town. The Still River, a tributary of the Farmington River, flows from south to north through the eastern side of the town.

=== Principal communities ===
- Winchester Center
- Winsted

== Demographics ==
Historical population
Census	Pop.	Note	%±
1820	1,601		—
1850	2,179		—
1860	3,513		61.2%
1870	4,096		16.6%
1880	5,142		25.5%
1890	6,183		20.2%
1900	7,763		25.6%
1910	8,679		11.8%
1920	9,019		3.9%
1930	8,674		−3.8%
1940	8,482		−2.2%
1950	10,535		24.2%
1960	10,496		−0.4%
1970	11,106		5.8%
1980	10,841		−2.4%
1990	11,524		6.3%
2000	10,664		−7.5%
2010	11,242		5.4%
2020	10,224		−9.1%
U.S. Decennial Census

At the 2000 census there were 10,664 people, 4,371 households, and 2,849 families living in the town. The population density was 330.4 inhabitants per square mile (127.6/km^{2}). There were 4,922 housing units at an average density of 152.5 per square mile (58.9/km^{2}). The racial makeup of the town was 94.44% White, 1.24% African American, 0.23% Native American, 0.93% Asian, 0.01% Pacific Islander, 1.69% from other races, and 1.46% from two or more races. Hispanic or Latino people of any race were 3.17%.

Of the 4,371 households 28.3% had children under the age of 18 living with them, 50.3% were married couples living together, 10.2% had a female householder with no husband present, and 34.8% were non-families. 28.0% of households were one person and 11.9% were one person aged 65 or older. The average household size was 2.42 and the average family size was 2.97.

The age distribution was 23.3% under the age of 18, 7.1% from 18 to 24, 29.4% from 25 to 44, 25.0% from 45 to 64, and 15.2% 65 or older. The median age was 40 years. For every 100 females, there were 94.0 males. For every 100 females age 18 and over, there were 90.5 males.

The median household income was $46,671 and the median family income was $57,866. Males had a median income of $41,076 versus $28,058 for females. The per capita income for the town was $22,589. About 4.3% of families and 6.7% of the population were below the poverty line, including 9.9% of those under age 18 and 7.4% of those age 65 or over.

== Transportation ==
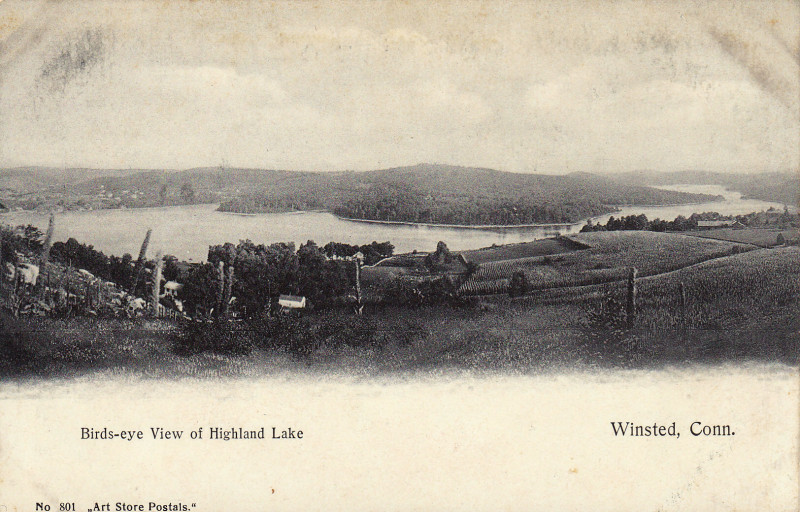
Highland Lake, c. 1905

The town is served by buses of the Northwestern Connecticut Transit District.

The city of Winsted is located at the junction of Connecticut Route 8 and U.S. Route 44#ConneU.S. Route 44. Route 263 connects Winchester Center and Winsted.

== Education ==
Winchester Public Schools is the public school district for grades K-6, while The Gilbert School serves as the public school for grades 7–12. Prior to 2011, middle school students went to schools operated by the Winchester district.

Northwestern Regional School District No. 7 maintains Northwestern Regional High School, which is partly in Winsted. However, the school does not act as the public school for Winsted. Students who live in Winchester can attend Northwestern Regional High School through their Agricultural Education Program.

Also located in the town, is Explorations Charter School. Created to serve a diverse body of students, the school was designed to accommodate the unique educational, social, and emotional needs of its students.

Prior to closing in 2020, the town also had a parochial Catholic school called St. Anthony School, of the Roman Catholic Diocese of Hartford. The school opened in 1865, and maintained a class of around 200 students. Experiencing a large decrease in enrollment, the school dropped from serving around 200 students, to just 90. When in operation, it was the oldest school continually operated by the archdiocese.

Northwestern Connecticut Community College is in Winsted.

== Notable people ==
- Ralph Nader, author and activist
- Phineas Miner (1777–1839), congressman from Connecticut; born in Winchester
- Guy Gilchrist, cartoonist
- Corydon Alexis Alvord (1813–1874), printer
