= Evelyn Weigold Crane =

American nurse (1919–2009)

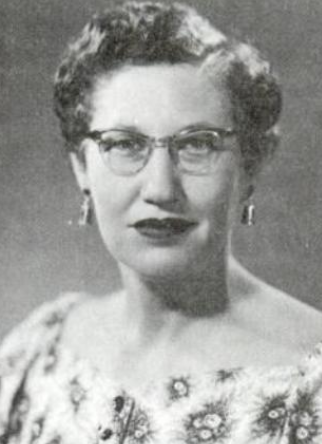
- Evelyn Weigold Crane, from a 1982 publication of the US Department of State
- Born: November 24, 1919; Winsted, Connecticut
- Died: October 17, 2009 (aged 89); Connecticut
- Occupations: Nurse, foreign service official

Evelyn Ethel Weigold Crane (November 24, 1919 – October 17, 2009) was an American nurse. She served as an Army nurse on a hospital ship in the China-Burma-India theater in World War II. She was the director of Foreign Service Nurses at the United States Department of State from 1955 until 1962.

== Early life and education ==
Evelyn Weigold was born in Winsted, Connecticut, the daughter of Robert R. Weigold and Gladys Marguerite Pulver Weigold. She graduated from the Gilbert School in 1937, and trained as a nurse at Rhode Island Hospital School of Nursing. After World War II, she earned two bachelor's degrees, in nursing and public health, at the University of Minnesota.

== Career ==
In 1942, shortly after becoming a registered nurse, Weigold volunteered as an Army nurse, part of the 48th Evacuation Hospital unit initially assigned to Fort Devens, then on a hospital ship, the USS Monticello, from 1943 to 1945. Weigold's unit was based in Burma, mostly treating Chinese troops under the command of General Joseph Stilwell.

After the War, Weigold worked as a nurse in Massachusetts. She joined the State Department, first posted at the US Embassy in Bangkok, where she established a health unit and assisted with embassy nursing projects at Okinawa, Saigon, Vientiane, and Phnom Penh. She worked in Washington as Director of Foreign Service Nurses in the department's Medical Branch, from 1955 to 1962. Myrtis Coltharp, a Red Cross nurse, succeeded Crane as director.

After 1962, Crane volunteered with Planned Parenthood, the American Red Cross, the Public Health Nurses Association, and other public health organizations in Connecticut. She was also active in reunions of the China Burma India Veterans Association in Hartford.

== Personal life ==
Weigold married a State Department medical director, Harold Le Roy Crane, in 1961. She retired to Connecticut with him the following year. When Crane died in 1974, she became a widow. She participated in hiking, backpacking, canoeing, and skiing in her later years in the Appalachian Mountain Club of Boston. She died in 2009 at the age of 89.
