= Louis T. Stone =

American journalist (1875–1933)

Louis Timothy Stone (October 19, 1875 – March 13, 1933), also known as Louis Stone, was an American journalist who fabricated stories about the flora and fauna surrounding the town of Winsted, Connecticut, thus earning himself the nickname of the "Winsted Liar." The most famous story attributed to him concerned the sighting of a "wild man" in the woods near Winsted. Research by Michael T. Shoemaker and Gary Mangiacopra suggests that Stone was not actually responsible for this story.

== Biography ==
Born in 1875, Stone was a lifelong resident of Winsted, Connecticut. At the age of thirteen, he began working as a Printer's devil at the Winsted Evening Citizen, later becoming a reporter for the same newspaper.

In 1895, Stone wrote what became his most famous story when he reported that there had been sightings of a "wild man" in the woods near Winsted. In the story, the Wild Man "wears no clothes, his eyes swim in red fire and he's a good rifle shot." He continued to create weekly reports, mostly about unusual flora and fauna around Winsted, that were reprinted in many newspapers. In tribute to his work, a billboard in Winsted announced:

Winsted, founded in 1779, has been put on the map by the ingenious and queer stories that emanate from this town and which are printed all over the country, thanks to L.T. Stone.

Stone died on March 13, 1933, and the residents of Winsted named a bridge in honor of him.

== Notable hoaxes ==
Some of the stories invented by Stone include:

- A hen that rode into Winsted on a train and laid an egg to pay the fare
- A tree that grew baked apples
- A cow that was locked in an ice house and produced ice cream for two weeks after its release
- A farmer who lost his watch and found it seven years later in the stomach of one of his cows, where it had been kept wound by the cow's stomach muscles
