= Gilbert Clock Factory =

- U.S. National Register of Historic Places
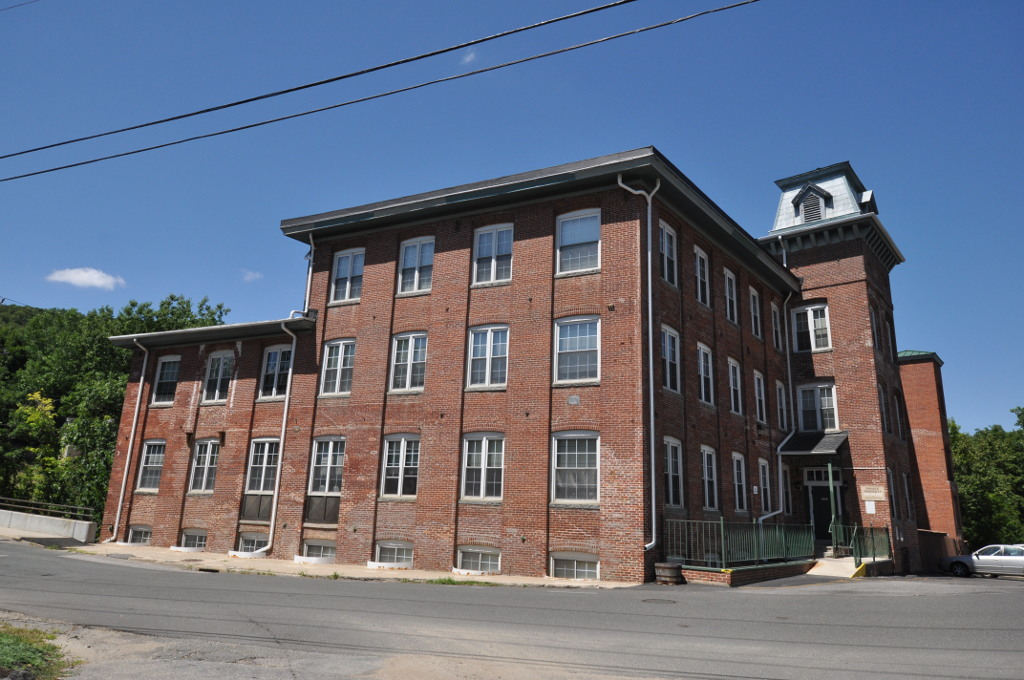

- Location within Connecticut Location within the United States
- Location: 13 Wallens Street, Winsted, Connecticut
- Coordinates: 41°55′49″N 73°3′29″W
- Area: 3.8 acres (1.5 ha)
- Built: 1871
- Architectural style: Late 19th And Early 20th Century American Movements, Second Empire, Mansard;19th C. Industrial
- NRHP reference No.: 84000494
- Added to NRHP: December 13, 1984

The Gilbert Clock Factory is a historic factory complex at 13 Wallens Street in Winsted, Connecticut. Developed between 1871 and 1897, its surviving elements are a preservation of the state's history as a center for the manufacture of low-cost clocks, one of several notable clock companies based in Connecticut. The company was one of the town's largest employers for many years. The surviving buildings were listed on the National Register of Historic Places in 1984; they now house apartments.

== Description and history ==
The former Gilbert Clock Factory stands in a residential area in the town of Winchester's main business district of Winsted, on the north side of Wallens Street on the eastern bank of the Still River. Its complex historically extended further to the south, and was about twice the size of the surviving elements; the buildings south of Wallens Street were destroyed by fire in 1975. The two large buildings that survive are four-story brick buildings, with typical late 19th-century commercial Italianate styling. One of the two buildings is built directly on the river bank, while the other is set up the hill to the east.

William L. Gilbert began his career in Bristol, Connecticut, a regional center of the clock business, and moved to Winchester in 1840, where he produced relatively low-cost wall and shelf clocks for the mass market. He built the case shop, located on the river bank, in 1870–71, when his business was one of the largest clock manufactories in the state. The company continued to grow, its complex on Wallens Street growing to four large buildings and employing more than 500 workers. The company continued in business until 1964.

Due to the historic use of radioactive radium in the manufacture of Radioluminescent clock hands at this location, in 2016 the Nuclear Regulatory Commission identified the remaining factory buildings as potentially containing a radioactive hazard to the public. On-site scoping visits and surveys in 2018 found a handful of locations with elevated dose rates in Building A but no evidence of transferable contamination or public health risk. Given the absence of public health risk the matter was closed with no further action required.

== See also ==
- National Register of Historic Places listings in Litchfield County, Connecticut
