= Northwestern Regional High School =

Location
- 100 Battistoni Drive; Winsted, Connecticut 06098; United States
- 41°54′49″N 73°02′52″W

Information
- School type: Public, high school
- Founded: 1958 (68 years ago)
- School district: Regional School District No. 7
- Superintendent: Judith Palmer
- CEEB code: 070962
- Principal: Gary Franklin
- Grades: 9–12
- Enrollment: 521 (2023-2024)
- Language: English
- Colors: Red and Gray
- Athletics conference: Berkshire League
- Mascot: Highlanders
- Feeder schools: Northwestern Regional Middle School
- Website: www.nwr7.com/high-school

Northwestern Regional High School is a public regional high school located in Winsted, Connecticut, serving the towns of Barkhamsted, Colebrook, New Hartford and Norfolk. Northwestern Regional High School, a part of Regional School District No. 7, is located in the same building as Northwestern Regional Middle School, which serves grades 7 and 8.

== History ==
Northwestern was founded in 1958 by an agreement between the towns of New Hartford, Colebrook, Norfolk, and Barkhamsted. Prior to the school's opening, students from these towns attended The Gilbert School. It has expanded several times through additions to the building. Public school students from the town of Hartland may attend a local high school of their choice, with Northwestern Regional included as an option. Students from Winchester and Winsted, Canton, and Torrington may attend Northwestern Regional if they are part of the school's agricultural education program.

== Academics ==
=== Accreditation ===
Northwestern Regional High School is accredited by the New England Association of Schools and Colleges.

== Athletics ==
Wins in CIAC State Championships
| Sport | Class | Year(s) |
|---|---|---|
| Basketball (girls) | M | 1990 |
| Tennis (boys) | S | 2000 |
| Wrestling | S | 2005 |
