= Charles H. Smith (historian) =

American historian (born 1950)

- Born: September 30, 1950 (age 76); Winsted, Connecticut, U.S.
- Education: Wesleyan University (BA); Indiana University (MA); University of Illinois Urbana-Champaign (PhD); University of Pittsburgh (MLS)
- Occupation: Historian

Charles H. Smith (born September 30, 1950) is Professor Emeritus at Western Kentucky University (WKU). He is best known for his work as a biogeographer, historian/philosopher and bibliographer of science, especially for his expertise on the career of Alfred Russel Wallace.

Smith was born in Winsted, Connecticut, and grew up in the nearby town of New Hartford. Since his undergraduate college years he has lived in Georgia, Connecticut, Indiana, Illinois, Australia, Pennsylvania, and, from 1995, Bowling Green, Kentucky.

He created and maintains the website The Alfred Russel Wallace Page hosted by WKU and devoted to Wallace scholarship, which includes a comprehensive bibliography of Wallace's publications and interviews, texts of Wallace's works, and writings on Wallace by Smith and others. Smith has also produced a number of conventional writings on Wallace including the anthology Alfred Russel Wallace: An Anthology of His Shorter Writings published in 1991, a three-volume collection Alfred Russel Wallace: Writings on Evolution, 1843–1912 published in 2004, an edited collection of writings Natural Selection and Beyond: The Intellectual Legacy of Alfred Russel Wallace published in 2008, Alfred Russel Wallace's 1886–1887 Travel Diary: The North American Lecture Tour published in 2013, Enquête sur un Aventurier de l'Esprit: Le Véritable Alfred Russel Wallace (translated by Antoine Guillemain) published in 2013, Dear Sir: Sixty-Nine Years of Alfred Russel Wallace Letters to the Editor published in 2014, An Alfred Russel Wallace Companion published in 2019, and about eighty journal articles, including many in the series Alfred Russel Wallace Notes (of which he is the Editor).

Smith was originally trained as a biogeographer and has produced written work in that and cognate fields, including the bibliographic compilation Biodiversity Studies: A Bibliographic Review published in 2000, and journal-based philosophical, historical and empirical studies; he additionally hosts several related websites. He has also created and maintains three well known sites on music education hosted by WKU: The 111 Greatest Acts of the Anglo-American Folk Music Tradition, The Classical Music Navigator, and Malvina Reynolds: Song Lyrics and Poems.

In April 2013 Smith was a recipient of the national President's Call to Service Award, given to individuals who over their lifetime have volunteered at least 4000 hours of their time to public service, for his "website development for global awareness and education." In 2020 he issued a novel, Many Miles Away. In 2023 he was the recipient of the silver Wallace Medal, awarded by The Alfred Russel Wallace Memorial Fund.

Smith received a B.A. (1972) in Geology, Wesleyan University, Middletown, Connecticut; M.A. (1980), in Geography, Indiana University; Ph.D. (1984), in Geography (emphasis: Biogeography; minor: History & Philosophy of Science), University of Illinois Urbana-Champaign; M.L.S. (1995), University of Pittsburgh.
