= Gatesville High School =

Location
- 205 South Lovers Lane; Gatesville, Texas 76528-0759; United States; 31.4329°N 97.7245°W

Information
- School type: Public high school
- School district: Gatesville Independent School District
- Principal: Elizabeth Shoaf
- Teaching staff: 66.66 (FTE)
- Grades: 9-12
- Enrollment: 782 (2024-2025)
- Student to teacher ratio: 11.73
- Colors: Black and athletic gold
- Athletics conference: UIL 4a
- Mascot: Hornet
- Yearbook: Crescent (Volume XCII)
- Website: Gatesville High School

Gatesville High School is a public high school located in the city of Gatesville, Texas, United States and is classified as a Class 4A Division 2 school by the UIL. It is a part of the Gatesville Independent School District located in central Coryell County. In 2015, the school was rated "Met Standard" by the Texas Education Agency.

== Athletics ==
The Gatesville Hornets compete in the following sports:

- Baseball
- Basketball
- Cross Country
- Football
- Golf
- Powerlifting
- Soccer
- Softball
- Tennis
- Track & Field
- Volleyball
- Wrestling

=== State championships ===
- 2000 - Football (3A Division 1)
- 2009 - Boys golf (3A)
- 2023 - Track and Field - 3200m (4A - Carlo Martinez)

== Notable alumni ==
- Myrtis Coltharp (1900–1993), foreign service nurse
- Cotton Davidson (born 1931), former AFL and NFL quarterback
- Margaret Royalty Edwards (1895-1969), Poet Laureate of Texas 1957-1959
- Taurean Henderson (born 1983), former NFL football player with the Atlanta Falcons and Minnesota Vikings
