= Corydon Alexis Alvord =

American printer

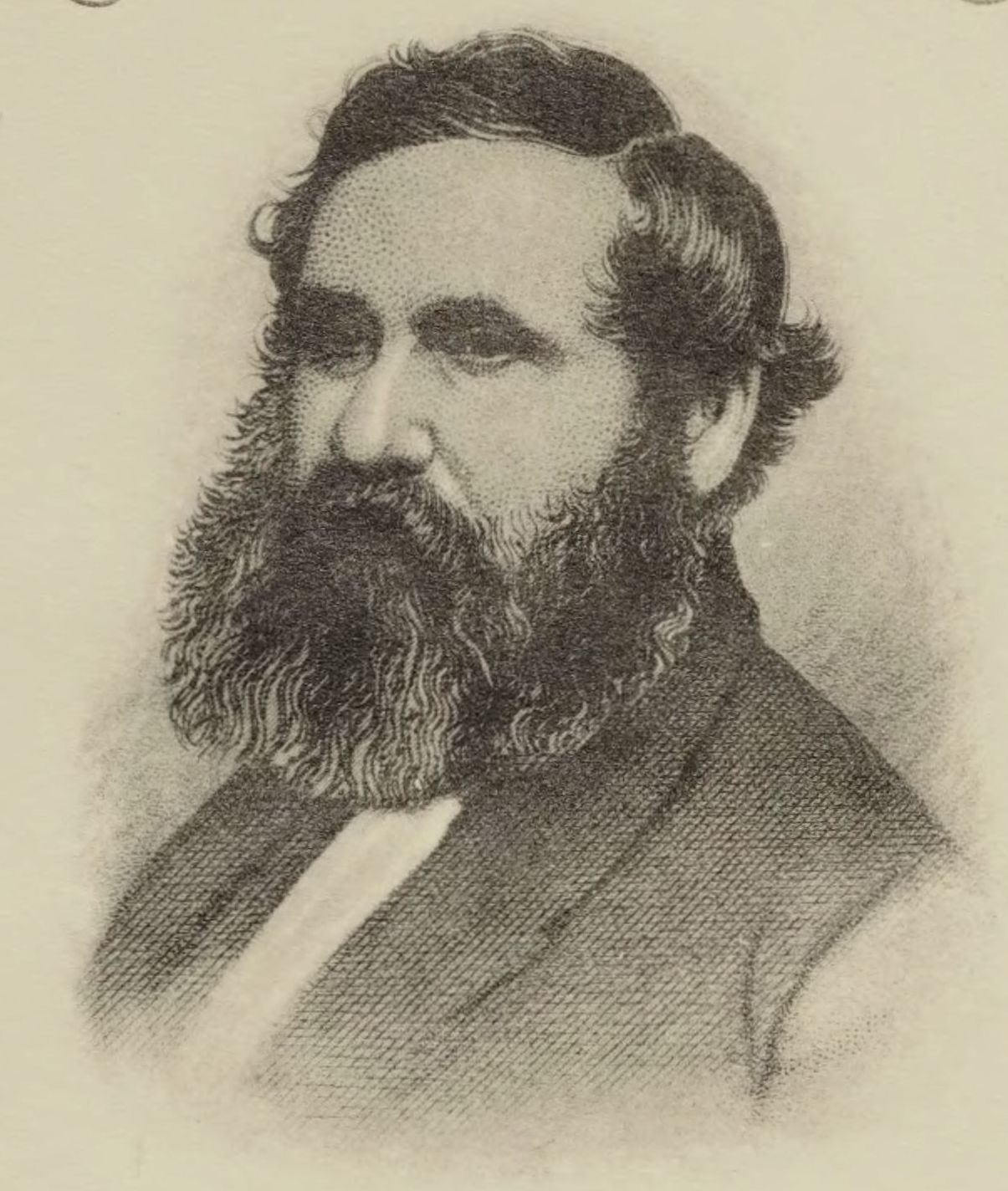
- Born: May 22, 1813
- Died: November 27, 1874 (aged 61)

Corydon Alexis Alvord (May 22, 1813 – November 27, 1874) was an American printer.

Corydon Alexis Alvord was born in Winchester, Connecticut. He learned his trade in Hartford, and in 1845 removed to New York, where he made a specialty of printing illustrated books, gaining a high reputation. His establishment on Vandewater St. was one of the most extensive in the country. Among its features were fonts of old-style type which enabled him to make reprints or facsimiles of old books and newspapers. There were monster vaults deep under ground, and extending under adjacent buildings, forming a series of immense storage-rooms guarded by thick walls and iron doors as thoroughly protected as the treasury vaults. These were for the storage of stereotype plates and valuable engravings. He began a reprint of the old records of the city of New York, but the work was not finished, owing to changes in the recorder's office. In the reproduction of old books and papers he succeeded in copying the discolorations made by age, in a remarkable degree. He was an active member of the typographical society, and president of the Typothetae. He acquired a competence, which was subsequently lost through the misconduct of others. In 1871 he retired from business, went to Hartford, and devoted his remaining years to the preparation of a local history of Hartford and Winchester.

Corydon Alexis Alvord died on 27 November 1874 in Hartford, Connecticut.
