= Turnersville, Texas =

Turnersville
- Nickname: Buchanan Springs
- Location within the U.S. state of Texas Turnersville (the United States)
- Coordinates: 31°30′00″N 97°37′30″W
- Country: United States
- State: Texas
- County: Coryell

Population (2004)
  - Total: approx. 350
- Time zone: UTC-6 (CST)
  - Summer (DST): UTC-5 (CDT)

Turnersville is an unincorporated community in Coryell County, Texas, United States. As of 2004, the estimated population was 350. It is located within the Killeen-Temple-Fort Hood metropolitan area.

== History ==
The community was originally named Buchanan Springs. The region was planned to be traversed by the Bosque and Chisholm Trails. Two miles east of the townsite still stood the Lone Tree, one of the county's oldest landmarks, in 2004. It led visitors, settlers, and cowboys in the 1860s to a running spring on an expansive prairie of lush rangeland that was home to numerous buffalo, deer, turkeys, horses, and longhorn cattle. Cal Turner, who settled there to shoe horses and repair wagons, gave his name to the village that gradually grew around the spring where all travelers camped. His blacksmith shop was the town's first establishment as a result. In 1875, there was a Turnersville post office established there. Joseph M. Black, the first postmaster, later donated five acres of property for a cemetery. There were three churches, a gristmill, a cotton gin, and approximately eight other businesses in Turnersville in 1885, which had a population of 300. A Masonic lodge was founded in that year. The town mainly exported cotton and grain. From 1895 through roughly 1916, Turnersville had prosperity, due in great part to the local cotton industry. One hundred sixty-two people lived there in 1916, along with Methodist, Baptist, Presbyterian, and Disciples of Christ churches and about ten businesses, including the Advance newspaper. Through the second half of the twentieth century, Turnersville's population progressively decreased. Despite the 1987 closure of the post office, a new fire station was constructed in 1988. The town had four enterprises and 155 persons by 1989. A functioning cemetery society still existed in Turnersville at the time, and it organized an annual homecoming on the fourth Sunday in May. A grain elevator, a community center, and a seed and fertilizer company were also present in the town at that time. In 2004, about 350 people were living in the area.

== Geography ==
Turnersville is located on Farm to Market Road 182, 12 mi (19 km) northeast of Gatesville and 40 mi (64 km) west of Waco in northeastern Coryell County.

== Education ==
A Presbyterian church served as the community's school in 1868. It continued to operate in 1885 and closed in 1968. Today, the community is served by the Jonesboro Independent School District.

== Geology ==
Turnersville sits on the Washita geological group. Major formations within the area include Buda limestone, Del Rio clay, and Georgetown limestone, including beds equivalent to Kiamichi clay at the base.

== Notable people ==
- Ewing Y. Freeland, football and baseball player, and later coach, was born here.
- Myrtis Coltharp, nurse, foreign service agent, and federal official.
