= Myrtis Coltharp =

American nurse

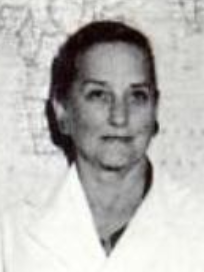
- Myrtis Coltharp, from a 1961 publication of the US Department of State
- Born: April 10, 1900; Turnersville, Texas
- Died: September 18, 1993 (aged 93); Austin, Texas
- Occupation(s): Nurse, federal official

Myrtis May Coltharp (April 10, 1900 – September 18, 1993) was an American nurse, foreign service officer, and federal official. In 1946, she became the first foreign service nurse employed by the United States Department of State, and she worked as a staff nurse at American embassies in Europe, Africa, and Latin America. From 1962 to 1963, she was the second Director of Foreign Service Nurses at the State Department.

== Early life and education ==
Myrtis Coltharp was born in Turnersville, Texas, the daughter of Marcellus Coltharp and Amanda Dove Blankenship Coltharp. She graduated from Gatesville High School in 1917. In 1921 she completed training at the Baylor University School of Nursing. She earned a bachelor's degree at Montezeuma College in New Mexico in 1927, and had American Red Cross training as a hygiene instructor.

== Career ==
Coltharp was a school nurse in Utah, taught at a Texas hospital, and was a public health nurse in Mississippi. She worked as a field agent and regional director of the American Red Cross before and during World War II, before joining the State Department in 1946, as the department's first foreign service nurse. She was staff nurse at the American embassies in Belgrade (1946–1950), Rome (1950–1955), Addis Ababa (1955–1959), Mexico City (1959–1961), and Conakry (1961). Late in 1962 she succeeded the first Director of Foreign Service Nurses, Evelyn Weigold Crane. Coltharp supervised foreign service nurses around the world as director, and retired from the State Department in 1963.

== Personal life ==
Coltharp died in Austin, Texas, in 1993, aged 93 years.
