= American Museum of Tort Law =

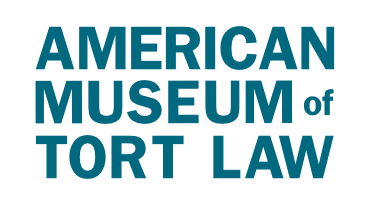

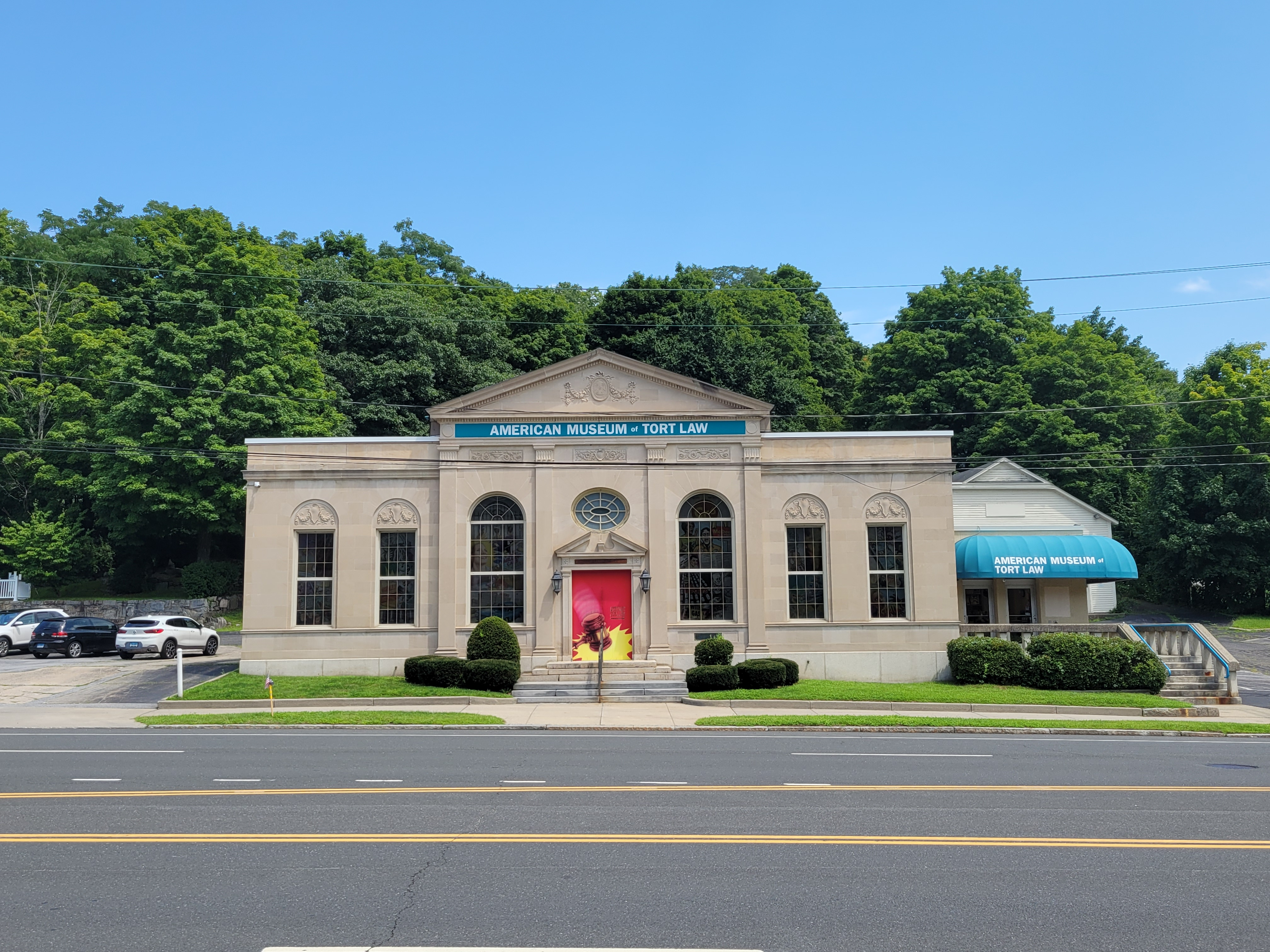
- American Museum of Tort Law

- Location in Connecticut
- Established: 2015
- Location: 654 Main Street; Winsted, Connecticut
- Coordinates: 41°55′25″N 73°4′32″W
- Type: Law museum
- Founder: Ralph Nader
- Website: tortmuseum.org

The American Museum of Tort Law is a museum developed by Ralph Nader, located in his hometown of Winsted, Connecticut. The museum focuses on topics of civil justice and "aspects of the legal system that handle wrongful actions that result in injury". The museum opened to the public in September 2015. It is the first law museum in the United States.

== Exhibits ==
The museum offers displays regarding the evolution of tort law, precedent setting cases, and cases that made a difference. Eisterhold Associates designed the museum's exhibits. That firm also lent its efforts to a number of museums across the nation, including the National Civil Rights Museum in Memphis, Tennessee, and the Jurassic Park Discovery Center at Universal's Islands of Adventure in Orlando, Florida. The main exhibit at the museum is a cherry red 1963 Chevrolet Corvair. Other exhibits which display information about historic personal injury cases which set precedents for tort law are on display as well.

== History ==
Originally announced in 1998, at an expected cost of $5 million or $10 million, Nader sought a way to turn abstract legal cases, on which he has spent significant time working, into interesting displays for the public. The museum planned to include exhibitions on some famous cases including McDonald's' scalding coffee, flammable pajamas, asbestos, breast implants, medical malpractice, the pollution of Love Canal, and a Ford Pinto with the exploding gas tank. Nader later removed plans to include the Pinto and instead settled for documentation of the Grimshaw v. Ford Motor Company lawsuit. Apart from the Corvair and the Ford lawsuit, exhibits about dangerous toys, toxic tobacco, and McDonald's scalding coffee cups were on display when the museum opened as well.

The museum's concept faced criticism from a number of sources, including questions on whether it would attract an audience outside of legal scholars and whether it would be anything more than Nader's tribute to himself. It was anticipated that the museum would open in late 2006 following eight years of planning and at a cost of more than $4 million. By 2006, Nader had raised more than half the funds necessary, despite some funders leaving the project, and the plans to use a former factory on Winsted's Main Street had been approved by the town.

In 2013, Ralph Nader purchased the former Winsted Savings Bank building at 654 Main Street. This 6,500-square-foot (600 m^{2}) building was approved by the Winsted Zoning Commission as the new site for the proposed museum. Building renovation and interior construction began in July 2014 and was completed in July 2015.

In June 2015, the museum hired Richard Newman as its first head. Newman is the co-author of the standard treatise on Connecticut Law of Torts and served as president of the Connecticut Trial Lawyers Association from 2004 to 2005.
