= John Groppo =

American politician (1921–2013)

John G. Groppo

Member of the Connecticut House of Representatives
- In office 1959–1985

Mayor of Winsted, Connecticut
- In office 1965–1975

Personal details
- Born: August 14, 1921 Winsted, Connecticut, U.S.
- Died: June 12, 2013 (aged 91) Winsted, Connecticut, U.S.
- Party: Democratic

John Groppo (August 14, 1921 – June 12, 2013) was an American mason contractor, businessman, and politician.

Born in Winsted, Connecticut, Groppo served in the United States Marine Corps during World War II. Groppo was awarded the Purple Heart Medal for wounds received as a result of enemy action in Guam on July 22, 1944. He was a stonemason and was the owner of Leo Groppo & Son Mason Contractors. He served as mayor of Winsted, Connecticut 1965 to 1967. From 1959 to 1985 he served in the Connecticut House of Representatives as a Democrat and was majority leader. In 1985–1987, Groppo was commissioner of the Connecticut Department of Revenue Services. He died in Winsted, Connecticut.
