= Winchester Public Schools (Connecticut) =

School district in Connecticut, United States

Winchester Public Schools (WPS) is the school district for the town of Winchester, Connecticut. It includes Winsted.

The district serves elementary grades (K-6) while middle and high school students are sent to Gilbert School. The district previously served middle school grades. In 2011 Gilbert School agreed to take middle school students. The district no longer took middle school students effective 2011.

In 2017 Melony Brady-Shanley became the superintendent of the district.

By 2018 enrollment in the district had declined.

== Schools ==
- Batcheller Early Learning Center a.k.a. Batcheller Elementary School (preschool-1st grade)
- Oak Street School (grades 2–3)
- Isabelle Pearson School (formerly Pearson Middle School) (grades 4–6)

Former schools:

- Mary P. Hinsdale School
  - The school was built in 1950. By 2017 its grade span was grades 2–4. By 2017 it had about 240 students. Hinsdale was scheduled to close in 2018. There were concerns over mold from warm weather and proximity to a river.
- Winchester Alternate High School
