= Northwestern Connecticut Transit District =

Northwestern CT Transit District

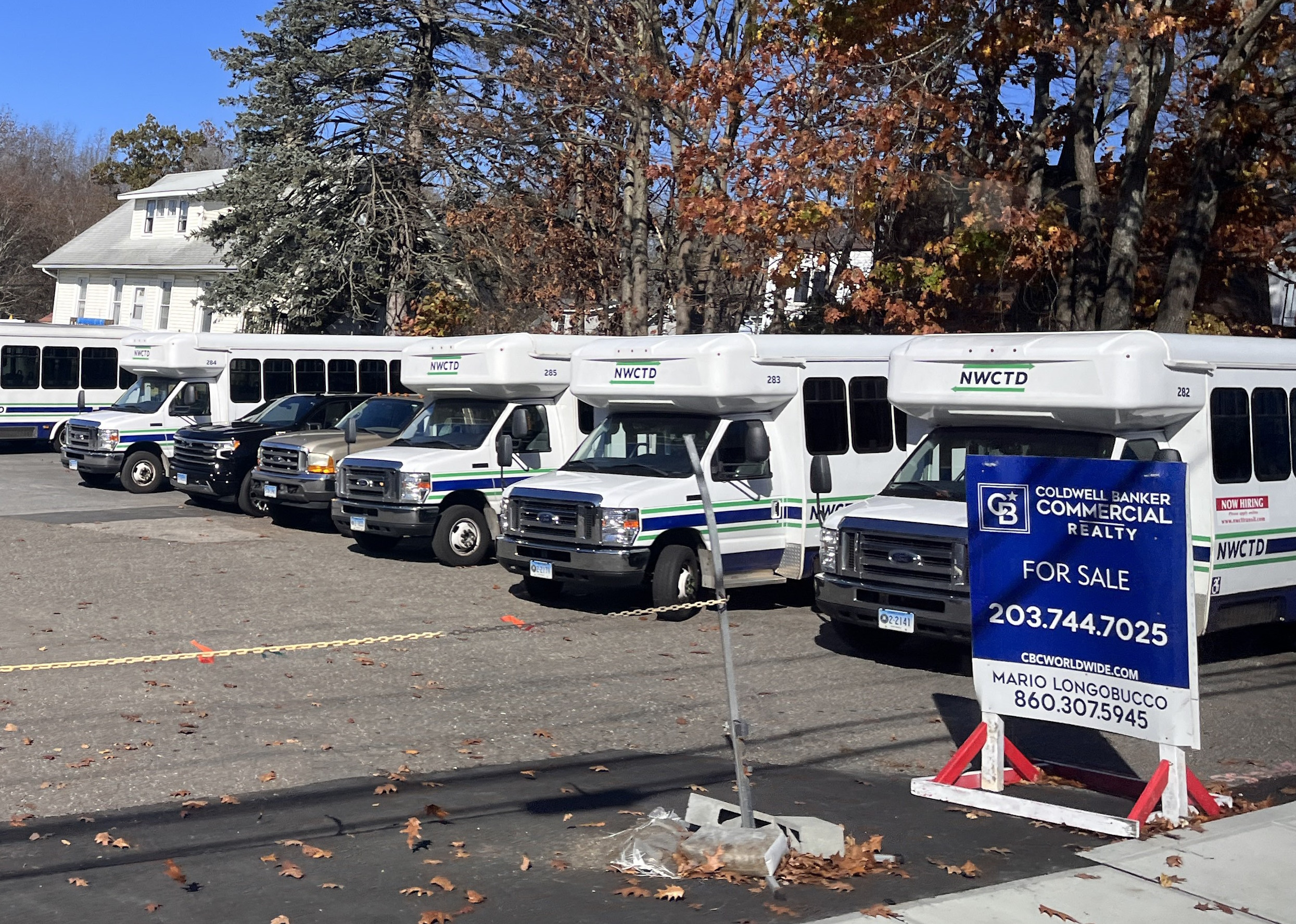
- NWCTD buses at the Torrington yard in November 2023
- Founded: 1987
- Headquarters: 281 Church St Torrington, CT 06790
- Service area: Torrington, and surrounding areas
- Service type: Local and shuttle bus service
- Routes: 5
- Website: www.nwcttransit.com

The Northwestern Connecticut Transit District (NWCTD) is an agency that provides local service in Litchfield County, Connecticut. It provides local bus service in Torrington, and Winsted, Monday through Saturday. The system operates four regular routes and one Saturday-only route. It is operated directly by the District after the failure of their contractor, Kelley Transit. It also offers dial-a-ride service.

== Bus routes ==
=== Route 1 ===
Route 1 is a route serving Winsted, which includes stops at Northwestern Connecticut Community College and other stops in the community.

=== Route 1b ===
Route 1b is a route serving Winsted, which only stops at Northwestern Connecticut Community College buildings. Operating Monday thru Thursday evenings.

=== Route 2 ===
Route 2 served the town of Litchfield. Service ended in 2023.

=== Route 3 ===
Route 3 serves the city of Torrington.

=== Route 5 ===
Route 5 serves the city of Torrington, and also includes service to the Charlotte Hungerford Hospital.

=== Saturday Torrington ===
The district also operates a Saturday-only route in the city of Torrington.
