= Ewing Y. Freeland =

American sportsman and coach (1887–1953)

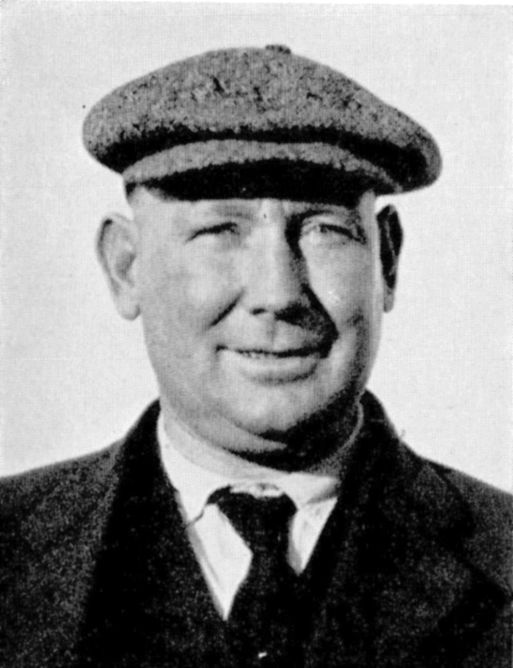
- Freeland pictured in the 1929 La Ventana, Texas Tech yearbook

Biographical details
- Born: January 1, 1887; Turnersville, Texas, U.S.
- Died: August 15, 1963 (aged 76); Brownwood, Texas, U.S.

Playing career

Football
- 1904–1906: Daniel Baker
- 1908–1911: Vanderbilt
- Positions: Tackle (football); First baseman (baseball)

Coaching career (HC unless noted)

Football
- 1912–1914: Daniel Baker
- 1915: TCU
- 1919–1920: Austin
- 1921: Millsaps
- 1922–1923: SMU
- 1925–1928: Texas Tech
- 1936–1938: Austin

Basketball
- 1915–1916: TCU
- 1921–1922: Millsaps

Baseball
- 1916: TCU
- 1923–1924: SMU
- 1926–1927: Texas Tech

Administrative career (AD unless noted)
- 1925–1927: Texas Tech
- 1935–1938: Austin

Head coaching record
- Overall: 77–49–16 (football); 2–11 (basketball); 50–47–3 (baseball)

Accomplishments and honors

Championships
- Football; 1 TIAA (1920); 1 SWC (1923)

Awards
- 3× All-Southern (1909, 1910, 1911)

Ewing Young "Big 'un" Freeland (January 1, 1887 – August 15, 1953) was an American football and baseball player and coach of football, basketball, and baseball. He served as the head football coach at Daniel Baker College (1912–1914), Texas Christian University (1915), Austin College (1919–1920, 1936–1938), Millsaps College (1921), Southern Methodist University (1922–1923, with Ray Morrison), and Texas Tech University (1925–1928), compiling a career college football record of 77–49–16. Freeland was also the head basketball coach at TCU for one season in 1915–16 and at Millsaps for one season, in 1921–22. In addition, he was the head baseball coach at TCU (1916), SMU (1923–1924), and Texas Tech (1926–1927), amassing a career college baseball record of 50–47–3.

== Biography ==
Freeland was born on January 1, 1887, in Turnersville, Texas and died on August 15, 1953, in Brownwood, Texas. He played football and baseball at Vanderbilt University, from which he graduated in 1912. He weighed some 200 pounds. He was nominated though not selected for an Associated Press All-Time Southeast 1869-1919 era team. In 1915, Freeland coached football at TCU, compiling a 4–5 record. In 1922 and 1923, Freeland co-coached the SMU Mustangs football team with his former teammate at Vanderbilt, Ray Morrison. The two effectively shared the heading coaching duties, with Morrison focusing on the backfield and ends, and Freeland mentoring the linemen. In 1925, Freeland became the first coach of the Texas Tech Red Raiders football team, then known as the Matadors. He coached football at Texas Tech from 1925 to 1928, where he had a 21–10–6 record. Freeland was also the first head coach of the Texas Tech Red Raiders baseball team and Texas Tech's first athletic director. He is credited with designing Texas Tech's Double T logo and had it put on the sweaters of football players.

The older version of Texas Tech's Double-T logo

== Head coaching record ==
=== Football ===
Year	Team	Overall	Conference	Standing	Bowl/playoffs
Daniel Baker (Texas Intercollegiate Athletic Association) (1912–1914)
1912	Daniel Baker	4–1–2			
1913	Daniel Baker	1–3–3			
1914	Daniel Baker	7–2			
Daniel Baker:		12–6–5			
TCU Horned Frogs (Texas Intercollegiate Athletic Association) (1915)
1915	TCU	4–5	2–0		
TCU:		4–5	2–0		
Austin Kangaroos (Texas Intercollegiate Athletic Association) (1919–1920)
1919	Austin	4–3–1			
1920	Austin	6–3		1st	
Millsaps Majors (Southern Intercollegiate Athletic Association) (1921)
1921	Millsaps	1–5–1	0–3	T–26th	
Millsaps:		1–5–1	0–3		
SMU Mustangs (Southwest Conference) (1922–1923)
1922	SMU	6–3–1	2–2	T–3rd	
1923	SMU	9–0	5–0	1st	
SMU:		15–3–1	7–2		
Texas Tech Matadors (Independent) (1925–1928)
1925	Texas Tech	6–1–2			
1926	Texas Tech	6–1–3			
1927	Texas Tech	5–4			
1928	Texas Tech	4–4–1			
Texas Tech:		21–10–6			
Austin Kangaroos (Texas Conference) (1936–1938)
1936	Austin	4–4–2	3–3	4th	
1937	Austin	8–2	6–1	2nd	
1938	Austin	2–8	2–5		
Austin:		24–20–3	11–8		
Total:		77–49–16			
National championship Conference title Conference division title or championship game berth

=== Baseball ===
Record table
Season	Team	Overall	Conference	Standing	Postseason
TCU Horned Frogs (1916)
1916	TCU	9–7			
TCU:		9–7			
SMU Mustangs (Southwest Conference) (1923–1924)
1923	SMU	16–10	14–6	2nd	
1924	SMU	10–19	5–16	6th	
SMU:		26–25	19–22		
Texas Tech Matadors (1926–1927)
1926	Texas Tech	11–2–1			
1927	Texas Tech	4–9–1			
Texas Tech:		15–11–2			
Total:		50–43–2			
