= American Mural Project =

Art mural

Image of the artist Ellen Griesedieck circa 2005.

The American Mural Project (AMP) is a nonprofit arts center located in Winsted, Connecticut, that offers exhibits, events, and educational programs. Its central exhibit is an indoor three-dimensional mural—a tribute to American workers measuring 120 feet long and five stories high. AMP was founded by artist Ellen Griesedieck in 2001.

== 3D mural ==
The mural was inspired by Griesedieck's work as a painter documenting Americans at work, as well as by the collaborative aspects used in the creation of the Watts Towers. It is considered to be the largest indoor collaborative artwork in the world, with more than 15,000 students and adults across the country contributing to its creation with Griesedieck.

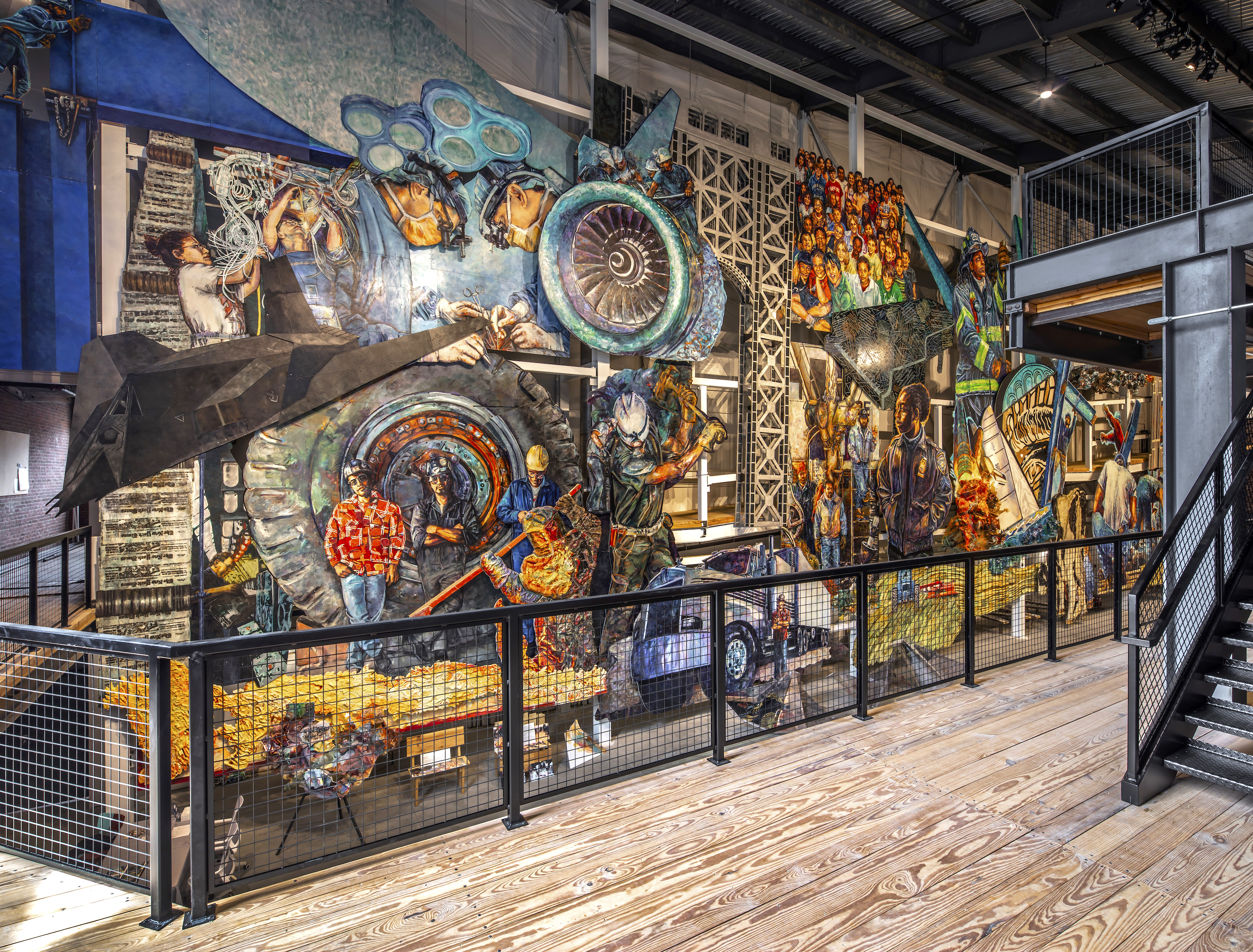
Image of the mural circa 2022.

The mural is viewable from the 5,000-square-foot ground floor and via the 3,000-square-foot second- and third-level platforms.

AMP opened in June 2022. In 2023, the organization began hosting live music and arts events, as well as art exhibits. AMP also offers education programs year-round centered on the themes of work and collaboration.

The three-dimensional mural depicts people at work. Professions include construction, printing, military, mechanics, aviation, medicine, smelting, mining, entertainment, transportation, fishing, glass blowing, music, law enforcement, firefighting, ironwork, aerospace, stone cutting, farming, automotive, education, communications, literature, agriculture, and electronics.

Some professions and worker depictions are literal and others are implied. Some professions are honored and symbolized by the materials used to create the mural. Other professions are represented by names or donated items.

The mural is primarily composed of paintings created by Griesedieck, with other multimedia pieces created from artistic materials attached to sections of the mural. Griesedieck created most of the three-dimensional elements, and students and other participants across the country constructed others. The sections of the mural displayed in the “Ramp Gallery” (opening anticipated in 2025) include pieces that were created during Griesedieck's travels across the country to work on collaborative projects in each U.S. state.

The first collaborative project took place in 2003 at Monument Mountain High School in Great Barrington, Massachusetts. The project involved students from eight rural and urban public and independent schools in Connecticut, Massachusetts, and New York and served as the model for future collaborative projects in additional states. To date, Griesedieck and her team have traveled to 17 states to create elements of the mural, with the goal to reach all 50 states. Griesedieck is still constructing and installing sections of the mural.

AMP has partnered with schools, nonprofits, and professionals—including NASA, Boeing, Habitat for Humanity, and HealthCorps—on projects that involve people from multiple states. These states are not included in the overall count of 17 collaborative state projects, but the people who worked on these multi-state projects are included in the 15,000 total collaborators.

Materials used in the creation of the mural include honeycomb aluminum panels, blown glass, copper, ceramics (two tons of ceramic tile), fabric, muslin, marble (6,480 lbs.), fiberglass, paint, Makrolon (polycarbonate), resin, fishing nets, lobster traps, lawn ornaments, bait bags, wire, shells, driftwood, watches (11,645 total), mesh, spackle, leaves, sand, dirt, bark, pinecones, feathers, plants, seeds, indigo, glue, tongue depressors, markers, photos, drawings, action figures, shoes, jewelry, medals, pencils, wood (128 sq. feet of scrap), and more.

== Events and education programs ==
As an arts center, AMP offers year-round events, concerts, and education programs for all ages. Past performers include musician Paul Winter, gospel singer Theresa Thomason, and poet Taylor Mali. Education programming includes school field trips, after-school programs, summer arts and innovation programs for children and teenagers, workshops, and professional development for educators. Visitors to the mural exhibit may also enjoy Family Days, lectures, and special presentations.

== History ==
AMP purchased two mill buildings in 2006 on Whiting Street in Winsted, Connecticut, located next to Whiting Mills, a 115,000 square-foot complex that houses fifty studios, craftspeople, and specialty shops.

AMP then began offering off-site education programs focused on the theme of work.

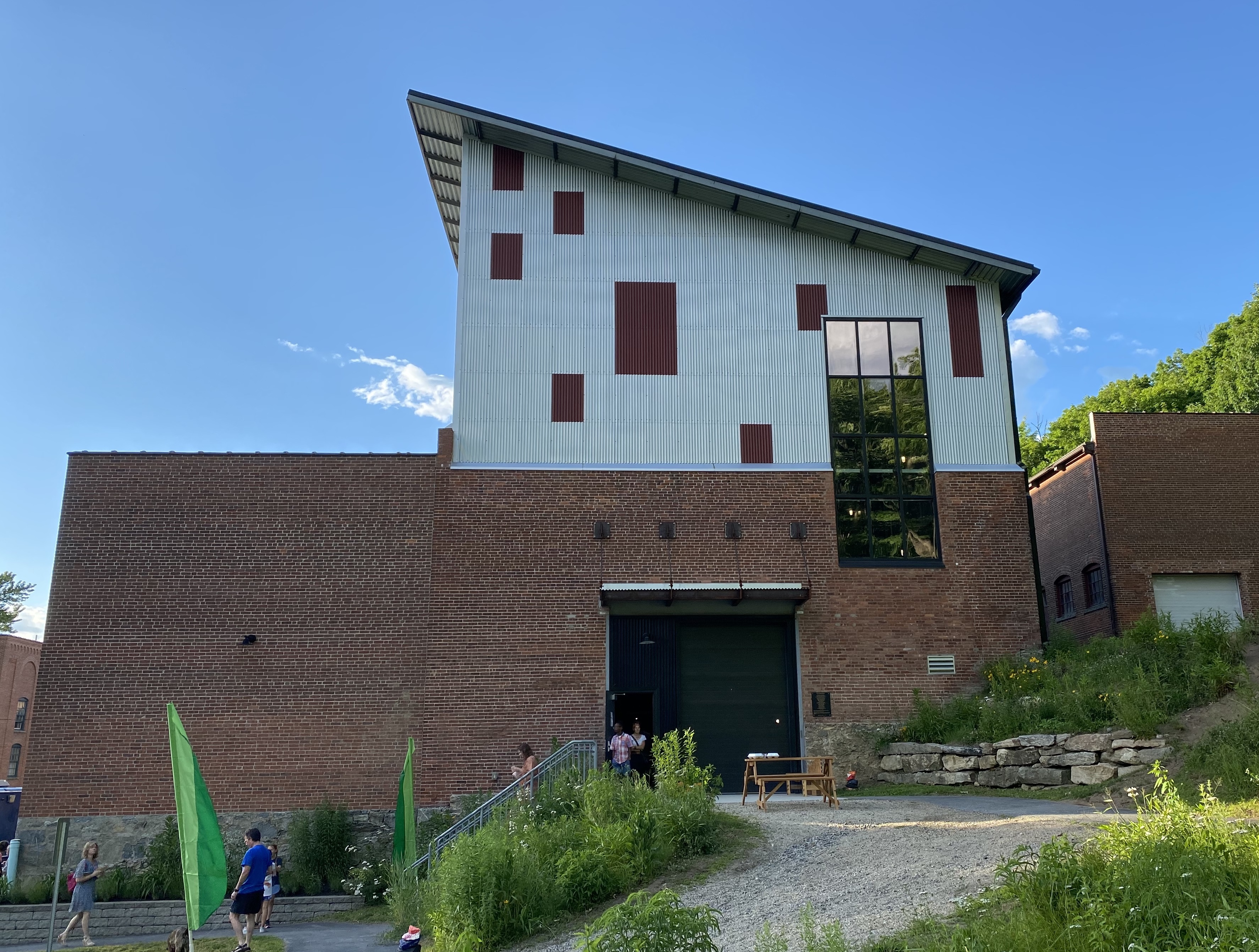
AMP's renovated mill building, circa 2022.

In 2008, AMP received an EPA Brownfields grant for extensive cleanup of the property, allowing the next phases of renovation to occur. The State of Connecticut pledged $1 Million in matching funds for the renovation of the first of two mill buildings, which AMP obtained after raising the required $1.4 Million from local residents, supporters across the country, and businesses. Renovations to the first building, which included raising the roof 25 feet and affixing nearly 120 tons of steel armature to support the five-story mural, began in 2017. The process of assembling and installing the mural started in 2019 and still continues, with approximately 95 percent of the installation complete.

AMP opened its doors to the public with regular hours in June 2022. On-site education programs now include school programs and field trips, summer enrichment camps, after-school activities, internships, and professional development workshops. Programs and art activities are also offered

Renovations to the exterior of the mill buildings are ongoing. The second mill building, which has not been renovated, will house the visitor and education center.

=== History of the mill buildings ===
Winsted was one of the first mill towns in Connecticut and one of the largest industrial employers in the late 1800s and early 1900s. In addition to being a manufacturing center for more than twenty factories for scythes, clocks, hardware, and electrical appliances, the town was also home to Winsted Hosiery Company. Founded in 1882 and occupying six buildings built in 1900–01 on the east bank of the Still River, the company was the largest hosiery manufacturer in Connecticut by 1936, also making underwear and other knit goods, primarily from wool. In the 1950s, Winsted Hosiery Company shifted to manufacturing wool sweaters and later changed its name to Winchester Spinning Company. The company moved all operations to North Carolina in 1965.

AMP occupies two mill buildings that were originally used for shipping, as well as storing scoured bales of wool, primarily from Australia. The Winsted Hosiery mill buildings were added to the National Register of Historic Places listings in 1985.

== See also ==
- National Register of Historic Places listings in Litchfield County, Connecticut
