= Northwestern Regional School District No. 7 =

School district in Connecticut, United States

Address
- 100 Battistoni Drive Winsted, Connecticut, 6098; United States

District information
- Type: Public
- Grades: 7–12
- NCES District ID: 0903720

Students and staff
- Students: 983
- Teachers: 88.26
- Staff: 117.54
- Student–teacher ratio: 11.14

Other information
- Website: www.nwr7.com

Northwestern Regional School District No. 7 (NWR7) is a school district headquartered in Winsted, Connecticut.

Its service area includes Barkhamsted, Colebrook, New Hartford, and Norfolk. Its service area does not include Winsted.

Within the total student body New Hartford residents comprise, in a given year, around 48% to 51%.

It operates two schools:

- Northwestern Regional High School
- Northwestern Regional Middle School

In 2023 the district selected Steve LePage as the superintendent.
