= Connecticut State Community College Northwestern =

Public college in Winsted, Connecticut, US

Coordinates: 41.9241°N 73.0603°W

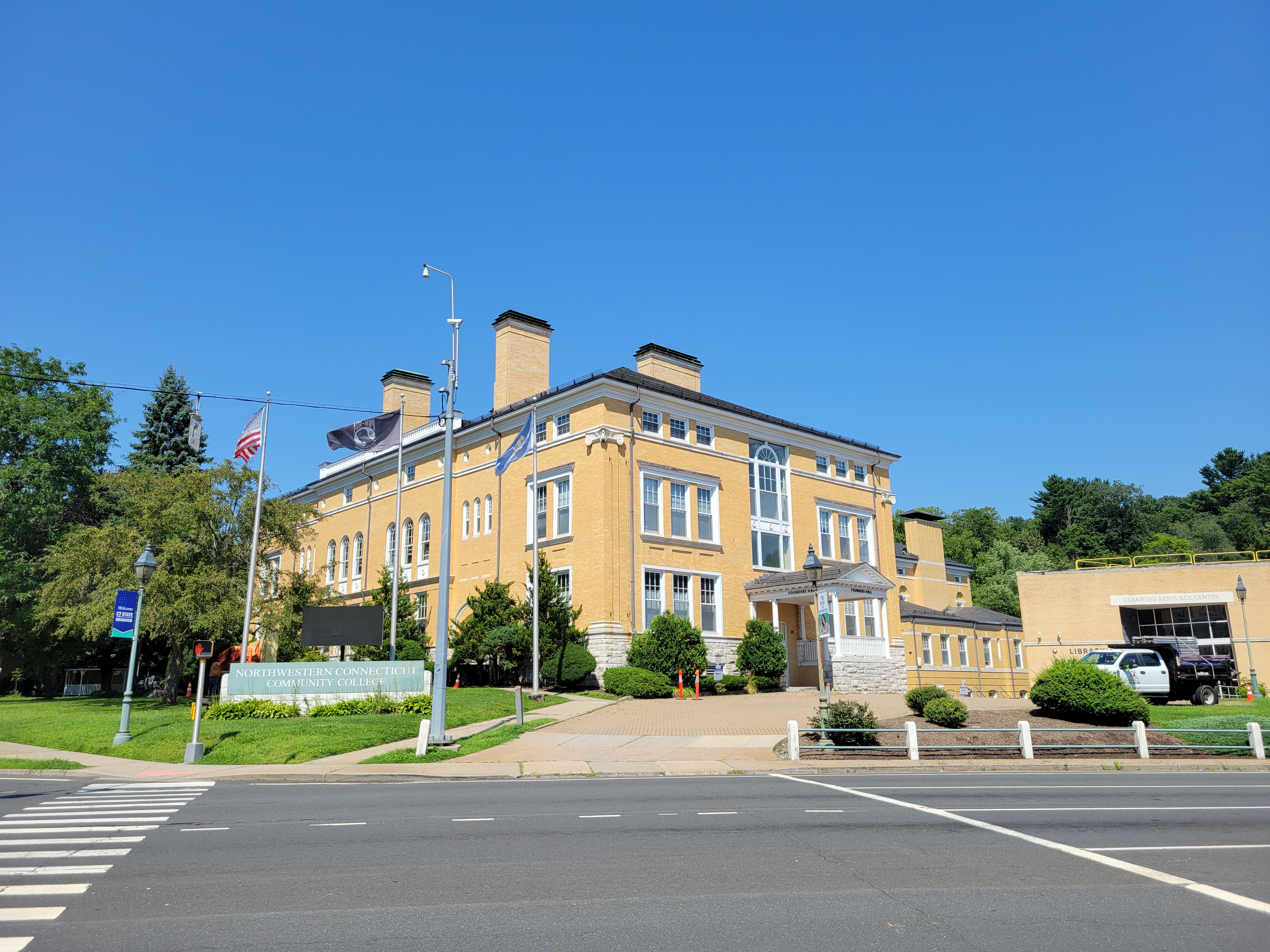
- Founders Hall
- Former name: Northwestern Connecticut Community College (1965–2023)
- Motto: The small college that does great things
- Type: Public community college
- Established: 1965
- Parent institution: Connecticut State Community College
- President: Michael Rooke
- Undergraduates: 1600
- Location: Park Place East, Winsted, Connecticut, 06098, United States
- Campus: Rural
- Website: ctstate.edu/locations/northwestern

Connecticut State Community College Northwestern, formerly Northwestern Connecticut Community College, is a public community college campus in Winsted, Connecticut, United States. First opened in 1965, it changed its name in 2023 when it merged with twelve other community colleges to form Connecticut State Community College. It is now a campu of that larger institution.

== History ==
Former seal

The Northwestern Connecticut Community College was founded in 1965 by Winsted residents, including Ralph Nader's older brother, Shafeek Nader, and Norfolk native Ralph H. Keiller. It opened in September 1965. It started as a private institution but the state took over funding and operation by November 19, 1965. The Northwestern Community College Foundation was incorporated in 1981.

A commuter school with no dormitories, the college's primary service area includes twenty towns in Litchfield County.

== Campus ==
The college is located on a rural town campus in Winsted, on Park Place East. It occupies the original Gilbert School building which was completed in 1895.

The 24,000-square-foot (2,200 m^{2}) Learning Resource Center was completed in 2003. The Library in the Learning Resource Center holds 41,000 volumes and subscribes to 180 periodicals, along with various audiovisual materials.

The 32,000 square-foot Arts and Science Center, completed in 2007, houses chemistry, microbiology, biology, physics, and general science laboratories on the first floor. The second floor consists of classrooms and lecture halls. On the third floor, there are art spaces for drawing, painting, ceramics, and graphic arts.

The newest building on campus, Joyner Health Sciences Center, opened in September 2017. The building consists of two floors and encompasses 24,400 gross square feet. The first floor is occupied by the Veterinary Technology Program and the second floor is home to the Allied Health program.

== Academics ==
=== Programs ===
The college grants associate degrees and certificates in 32 fields, including business administration, general studies, liberal arts and sciences, liberal studies, registered nursing. It also offers an honors program for students who meet the prerequisites.

The college conducts the state's only Veterinary Technology Program and it also runs an Interpreter Training Program for interpreters for the Deaf and the Deaf Studies Program. It was the sixth community college in the state to offer the Connecticut Community College Nursing Program (CT-CCNP).

=== Students ===
In 2021, the college has 1,228 students, including 457 full-time and 771 part-time students. Of those, 68 percent were female and 32 percent were male, described as 75 percent White, 16 percent Hispanic/Latino, 3 percent Black, 2 percent two or more races, and 1 percent Asian.

=== Faculty ===
In 2021, the college had a student-to-faculty ratio of fourteen to one. Michael Rooke is the campus president.

=== Accreditation ===
The college is accredited by the New England Commission of Higher Education through its parent institution.

== Student life ==
The campus has a chapter of the Phi Theta Kappa honor society. The college also has a student newspaper, The Jabberwocky.
