= Gilbert School =

Coordinates: 41.9304°N 73.0725°W

The Gilbert School
- The front of the school on May 23, 2012

Location
- 200 Williams Avenue; Winsted, Litchfield County, Connecticut 06098; United States

Information
- Founded: 1895 (131 years ago)
- Founder: William L. Gilbert
- CEEB code: 070960
- Principal: Debra Lewis
- Head of school: Michael Susi
- Grades: 7–12
- Colors: Blue and gold
- Slogan: Heritage. Innovation. Opportunity.
- Athletics conference: Berkshire League
- Mascot: Yellowjacket
- Rival: Northwestern Regional High School; Housatonic Valley Regional High School
- Yearbook: Miracle
- Communities served: Winsted
- Alumni: Ralph Nader
- Website: www.gilbertschool.org

The Gilbert School is a privately endowed secondary school that serves as the public high school for the towns of Winchester and Hartland, Connecticut and the public middle school for Winchester. The Gilbert School serves grades 7–12 and was founded in 1895.

== History ==
The Gilbert School was founded in 1895 as the result of the bequest of William L. Gilbert who, in his will, made provision for the "establishment and maintenance of an institution of learning to be known as The Gilbert School." He directed that the school should give instruction "for the improvement of mankind by affording such assistance and means of educating the young as will help them to become good citizens."

Gilbert named 16 trustees who were to establish the school. Seven trustees were chosen to govern the school, forming The Gilbert School Committee. This committee was to be responsible for the day-to-day operation of the new institution. Gilbert died in June 1890, leaving over half a million dollars for the school.

The school was opened on September 10, 1895, with Dr. John E. Clark as its principal, a faculty of seven teachers, and a student body of 143 pupils. It was located on Park Place East, the current site of Northwestern Connecticut Community College. In September 1959, a new school was built on Williams Avenue on the site of the former W. L. Gilbert Home with funds from the Gilbert Trust at no cost to the town.

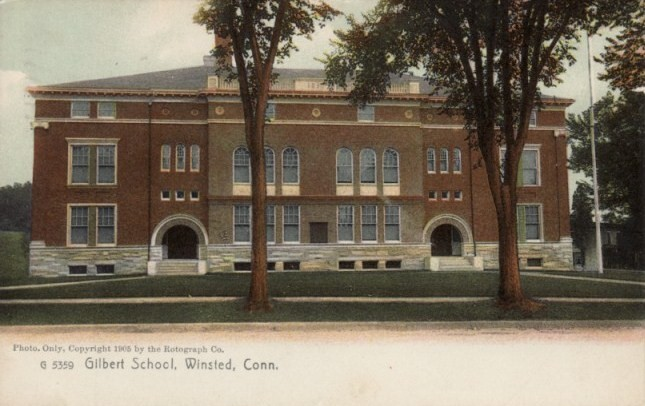
The Gilbert School in 1910

Gilbert is known as an endowed New England town academy—a private school that accepts public school students, with the town paying an annual tuition for each pupil. There are two similar schools left in the state of Connecticut—Norwich Free Academy and Woodstock Academy—and several others in northern New England. For 52 years, from 1895 to 1947, the school operated tuition-free for the residents of the town of Winchester. However, since 1947 it has been necessary to charge tuition to each town that sends students to Gilbert.

In 1991, Gilbert was restructured into two separate corporations: the W. L. Gilbert Trust Corporation and the W. L. Gilbert School Corporation. The School Corporation increased to three the public representatives on its board from Winchester and added one representative from Hartland. This change brought the school into a new era of school governance, whereby the State of Connecticut was able to provide direct funding for building and educational projects.

In 2010, the town of Winchester reached an agreement with the school to send its 7th- and 8th-graders to Gilbert beginning in September 2011.

== The Gilbert School today ==
Today, The Gilbert School is a six-year comprehensive middle and secondary school offering a variety of challenging academic programs designed to meet the needs of all its students. The head of school/superintendent is Greg Shugrue. There is a faculty and support staff of 70 and a student body of approximately 540 students.

Gilbert continues to maintain a tradition of strong interscholastic athletics, as well as student extracurricular activities including music, drama, yearbook and newspaper. The program is geared to provide students with the essential knowledge and skills to be successful in postsecondary study and/or entry into the world as productive citizens.

Gilbert is fully accredited by the Connecticut State Department of Education and the New England Association of Schools and Colleges.

The school has boarding facilities for international students.

== Athletics ==
The Gilbert School athletics logo.

Gilbert supports a number of sports, and has won a large number of Berkshire League Championships.

The Gilbert mascot is the Yellowjacket, and its colors are royal blue and gold. It is a member of the Berkshire League. The school has the following sports:

=== Boys sports ===
Fall:

- Football (League Champions, 1972)
- Soccer
- Cross country

Winter:

- Basketball (Berkshire League Champions, 2008, 2012)
- Swimming
- Wrestling (Berkshire League Champions, 2009)

Spring:

- Baseball (1973, 1976, 1979, CIAC Class "M" and 1989 & 1993 Class "S" State Champions)
- Track and field
- Tennis
- Golf

=== Girls sports ===
Fall:

- Soccer
- Cross country

Winter:

- Basketball
- Swimming

Spring:

- Softball
- Track and field
- Tennis
- Golf

Wins in CIAC State Championships
Sport	Class	Year(s)
Baseball	S	1989, 1993
Baseball	M	1973, 1976, 1979
Basketball (boys)	S	1998, 1999
Cross country (girls)	SS	1996
Volleyball (girls)	S	1986, 2000
Wrestling	S	2019

== Notable alumni ==
- Ralph Nader '51, author, lawyer, political activist, and four-time presidential candidate.
- Evelyn Weigold Crane '37, army nurse in WWII, chief of foreign service nurses for US State Department, 1955-1962

== See also ==
Other Connecticut private academies acting as public high schools:

- Norwich Free Academy
- Woodstock Academy

Other private academies acting as public high schools:

- Coe-Brown Northwood Academy
- Pinkerton Academy
- St. Johnsbury Academy
- Fryeburg Academy
- John Bapst Memorial High School
- Burr and Burton Academy

Private high schools in Maine which take students with public funds (from unorganized areas and/or with agreements with school districts):

- Foxcroft Academy
- Lee Academy
- Lincoln Academy
- George Stevens Academy
- Washington Academy
- Waynflete School
