= Winsted, Connecticut =

CDP in Connecticut, United States

- Census-designated place
- City of Winsted
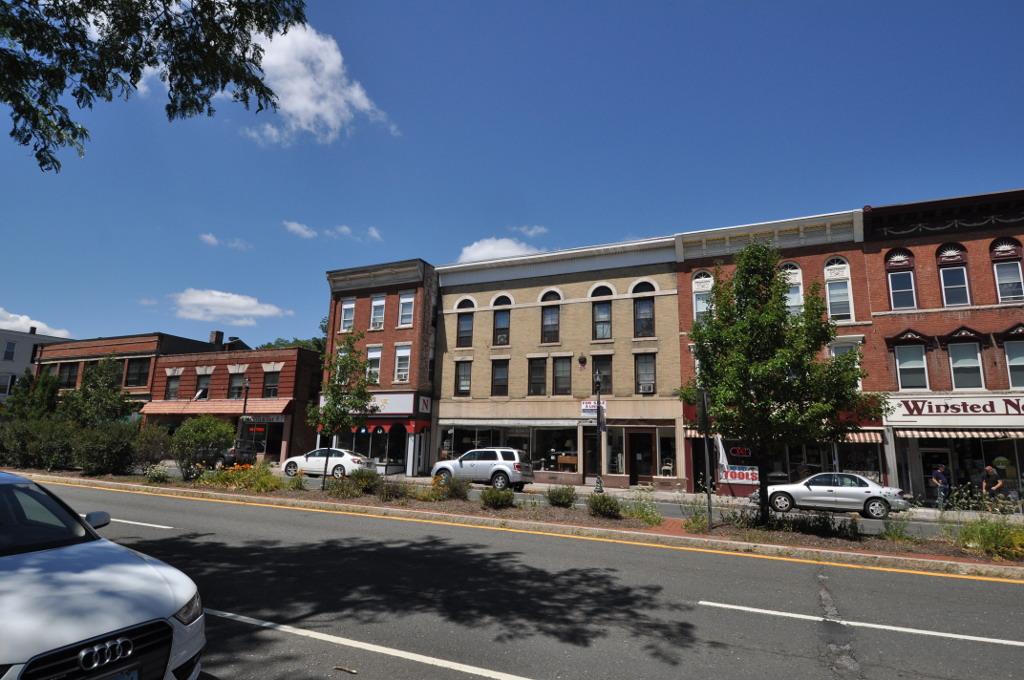
- West End Commercial District
- Nickname: Laurel City
- Coordinates: 41°55′15″N 73°3′33″W
- Country: United States
- State: Connecticut
- County: Litchfield
- Region: Northwest Hills
- Town: Winchester
- Established: 1858 (borough); 1917 (city)

Government
  - Type: New England town (Winchester)
  - Board of selectmen: Todd Arcelaschi, Mayor (R); William Hester (R); Troy Lemere (R); Paul Marino (R); Althea C. Perez (D); William Pozzo (R); Linda Groppo (D)
  - Town Manager: Paul Harrington

Area
  - Total: 4.8 sq mi (12.4 km^{2})
  - Land: 4.6 sq mi (12.0 km^{2})
  - Water: 0.19 sq mi (0.5 km^{2})
- Elevation: 713 ft (217 m)

Population (2010)
  - Total: 7,712
  - Density: 1,668/sq mi (644.2/km^{2})
- Time zone: UTC-5 (Eastern (EST))
  - Summer (DST): UTC-4 (EDT)
- ZIP codes: 06363, 06098
- Area codes: 860/959
- FIPS code: 09-87350
- GNIS feature ID: 0212198
- Website: www.townofwinchester.org

Winsted is a census-designated place and an incorporated city in Litchfield County, Connecticut, United States. It is part of the town of Winchester. The population of Winsted was 7,192 at the 2020 census, a decrease from 7,712 at the 2010 census. It comprises the majority of the town of Winchester's 10,224 population. Winsted is part of the Northwest Hills Planning Region.

== History ==
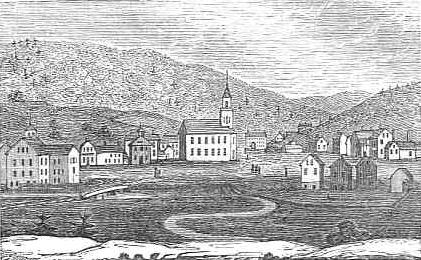
Winsted in 1836, a woodblock print drawn by John Warner Barber

Settled in 1750, the city of Winsted was formed at the junction of the Mad River and Still River and was one of the first mill towns in Connecticut. Manufactured products started with scythes at the Winsted Manufacturing Company in 1792. The city is within the town of Winchester, and its name derives from the fact that it is the business center for the towns of Winchester and Barkhamsted.

Winsted, along with New Haven, Connecticut, was a center for the production of mechanical clocks in the 1900s. The Gilbert Clock Company, located along the Still River north of town, was founded in 1871 by William L. Gilbert (1806–1890) and became one of the largest clock companies in the world around the start of the 20th century.

Panoramic map of Winsted with building images inset and sights listed (1908)

The Winsted post office contains an oil on canvas mural, Lincoln's Arbiter Settles the Winsted Post Office Controversy, painted by muralist Amy Jones in 1938. Federally commissioned murals were produced from 1934 to 1943 in the United States through the Section of Painting and Sculpture, later called the Section of Fine Arts, of the Treasury Department.

The Gilbert School, originally endowed with more than $600,000 by William L. Gilbert, is a private secondary school that serves as the public high school for the town of Winchester.

In 1955, Hurricane Connie and Hurricane Diane passed over Connecticut within one week, flooding the Mad River and Still River through downtown. The Mad River, which parallels Main Street, caused flooding up to 10 feet (3.0 m) deep through the center of town. This damaged the buildings between Main Street and the river such that all buildings on that side of Main Street through the center of town were subsequently removed and Main Street widened to four lanes. The buildings on the north side of Main Street for the most part survived and were repaired. Further downstream, the Still River flowed between the buildings of the Gilbert Clock Company. The flooding caused extensive damage to their buildings, and this was the final blow to a company which was already in poor financial condition.

Northwestern Connecticut Community College was founded in 1965 by Winsted residents, including Ralph Nader's older brother, Shafeek. It occupies the original Gilbert School building. NCCC was one of the first four community colleges in Connecticut, and is accredited by both the Connecticut Board of Governors for Higher Education and by the New England Association of Schools and Colleges. The Northwestern Community College Foundation was incorporated in 1981 to support the mission of Northwestern Connecticut Community College. NCCF generates private funds for the purpose of benefiting the students attending NCCC and the community of Winsted.

In 2013, Henry Centrella, the former city finance director, was served a complaint which stated that over $2.2 million was misappropriated during his 30-year tenure.

Ralph Nader opened the American Museum of Tort Law in 2015, inside the former Winsted Savings Bank building at 654 Main Street.

== Pictures ==
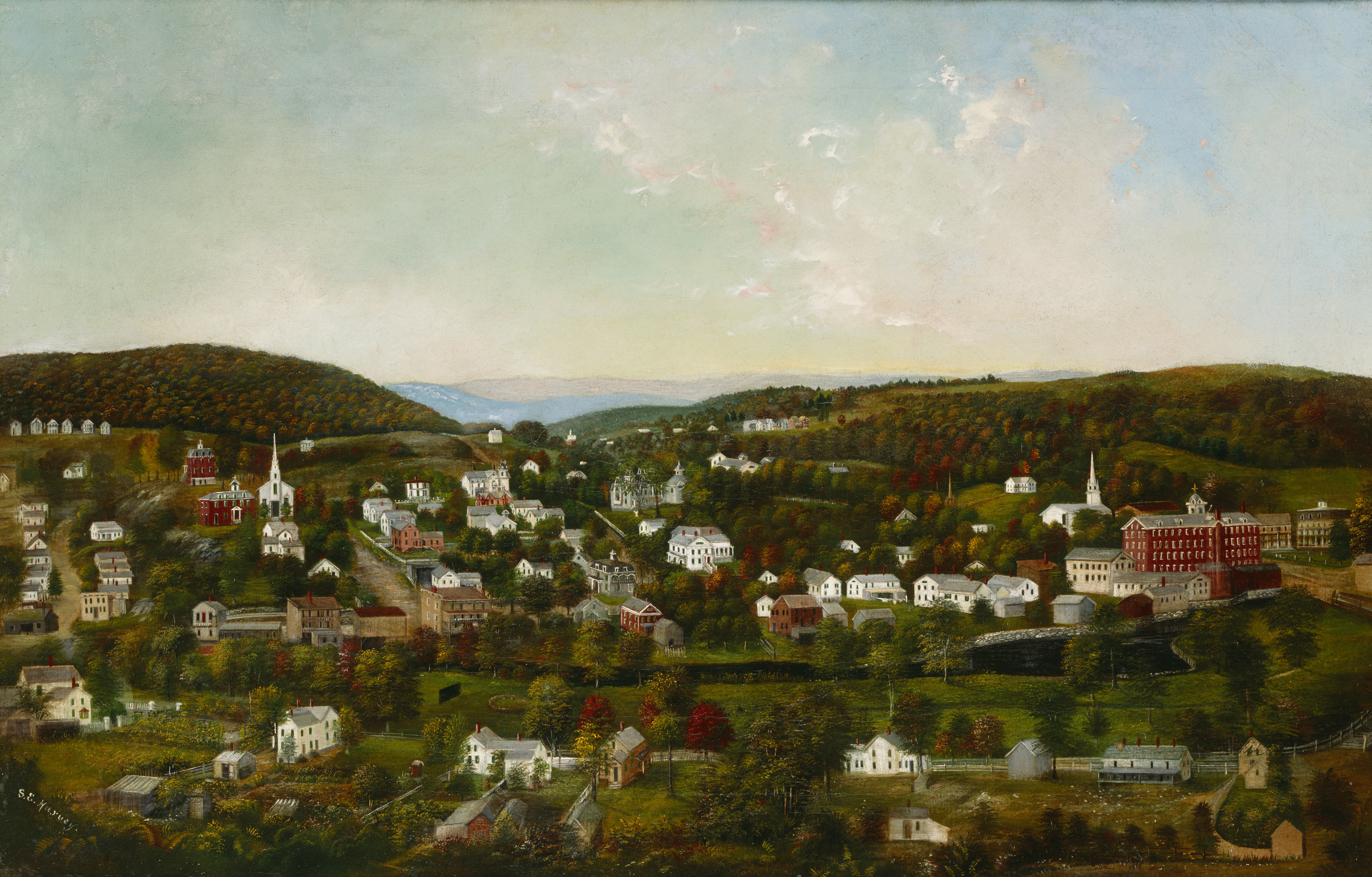
Sarah E. Harvey, Winsted, Connecticut, c. 1877, Princeton University Art Museum

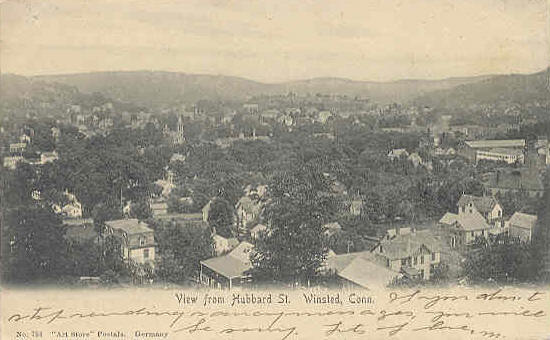
View from Hubbard Street, c. 1906

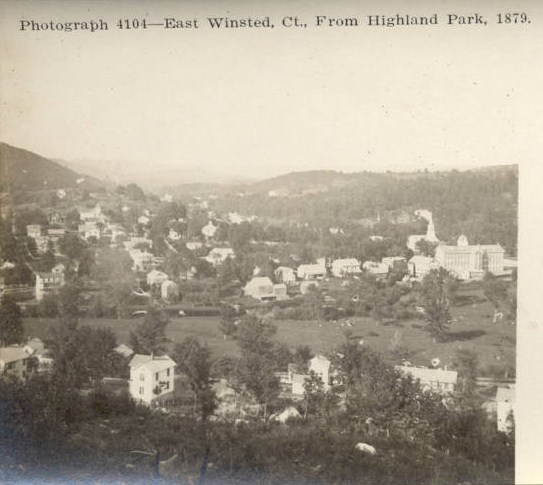
View from Highland Park, 1879

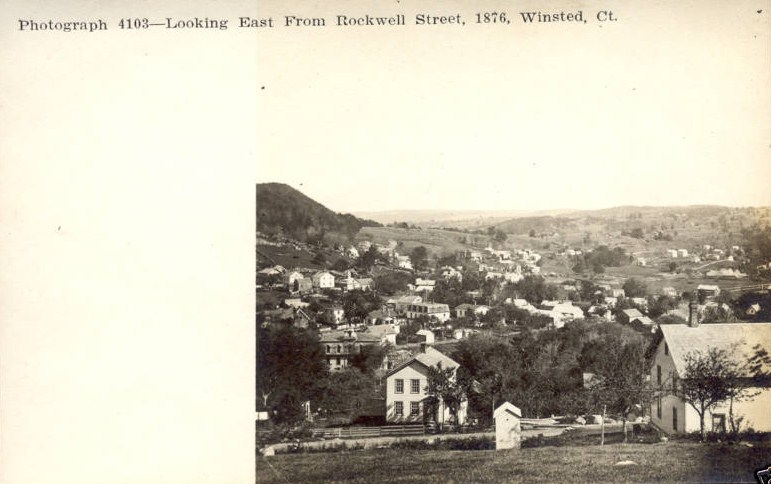
View east from Rockwell Street, 1876

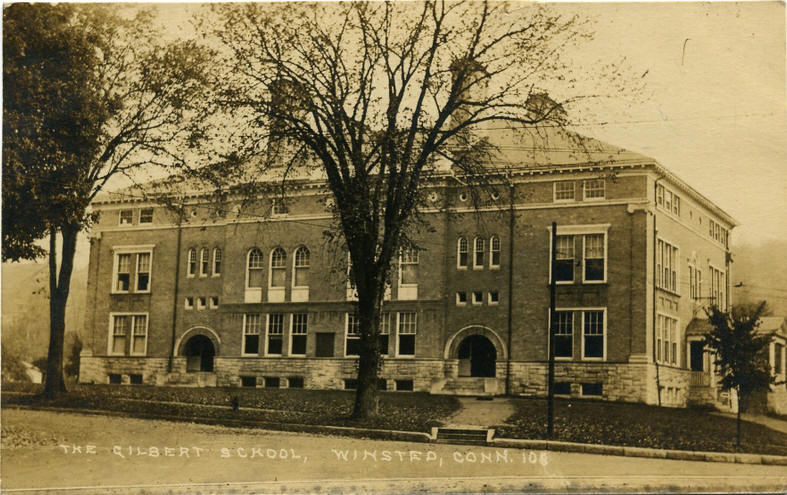
The Gilbert School, c. 1921

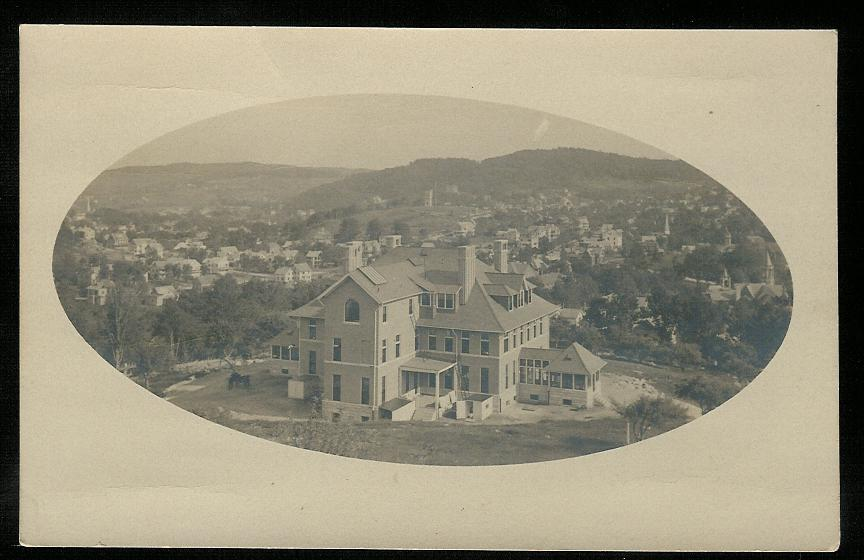
Litchfield County Hospital, c. 1904

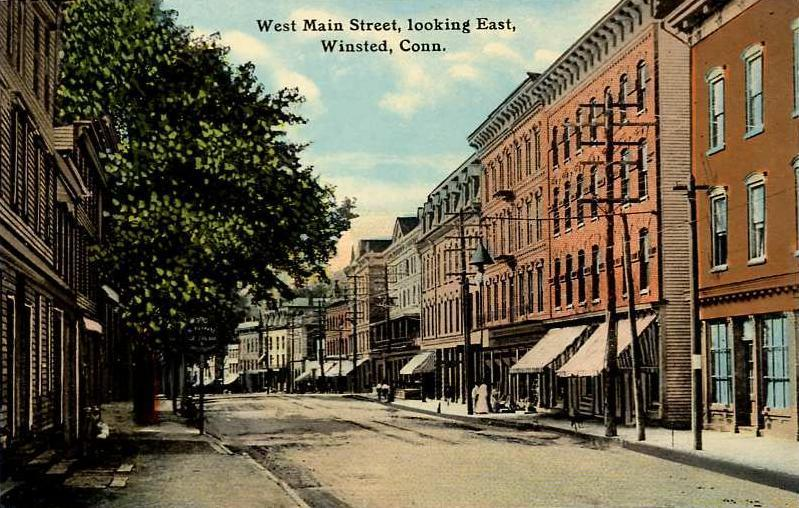
West Main Street, c. 1912

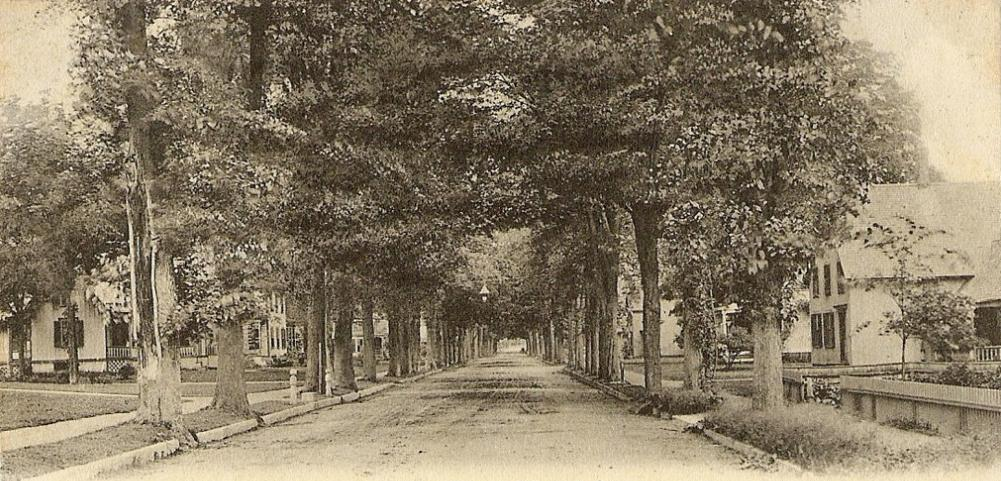
Meadow Street, c. 1906

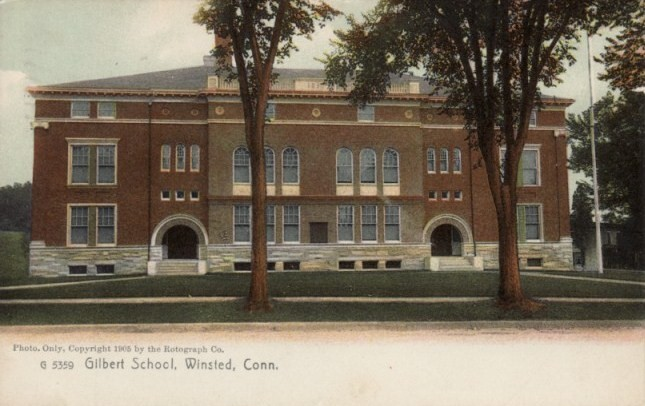
The Gilbert School, c. 1910

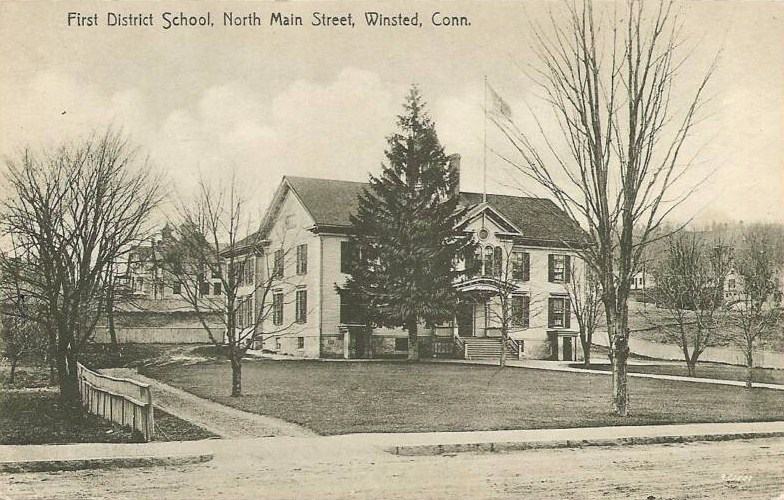
First District School, c. 1908

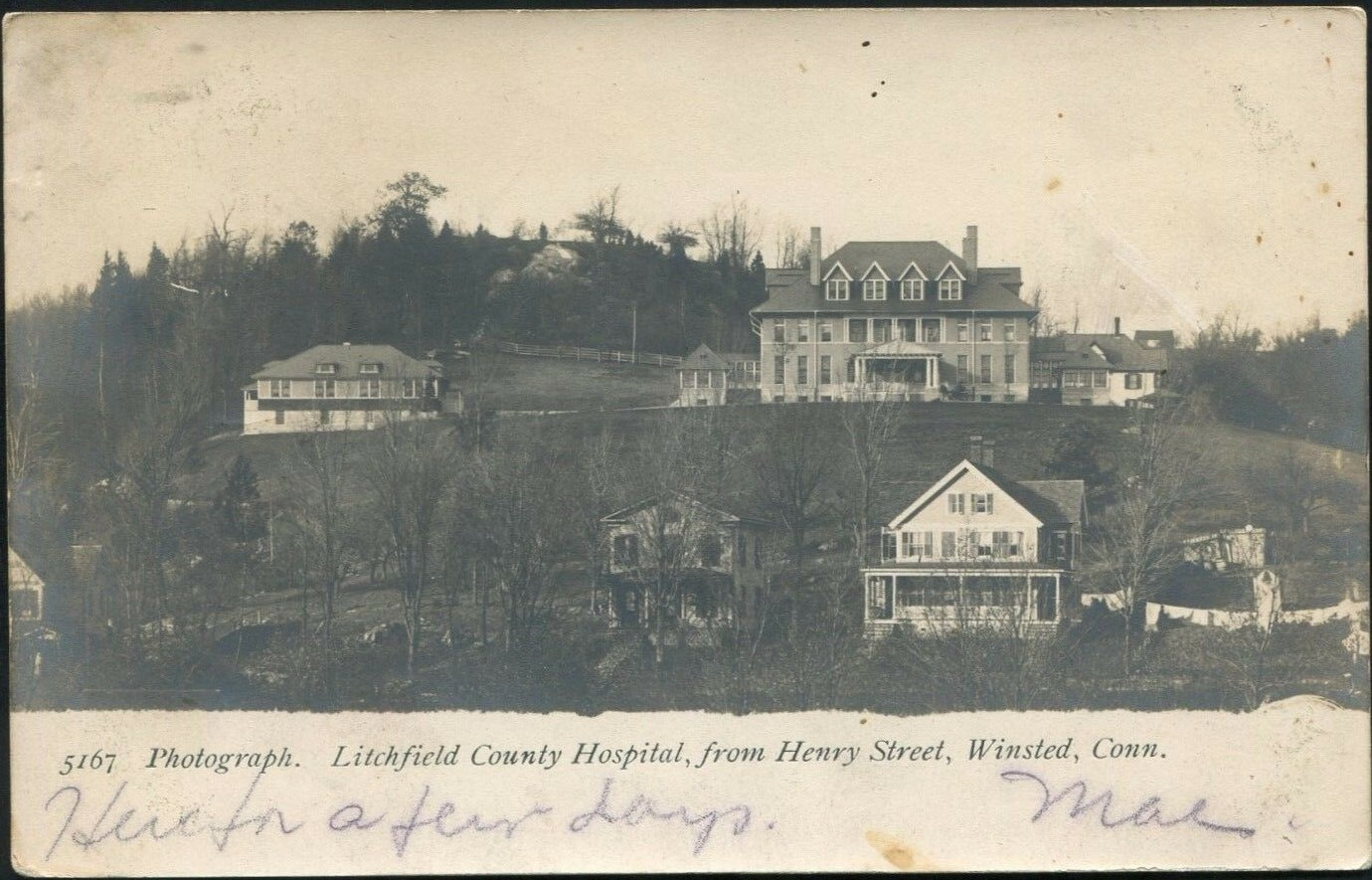
County hospital as seen from Henry Street, c. 1910

== Geography ==
According to the United States Census Bureau, the CDP has a total area of 4.8 square miles (12.4 km^{2}), of which 4.6 square miles (12.0 km^{2}) are land and 0.19 square miles (0.5 km^{2}), or 3.73%, are water.

Winsted sits in the eastern part of the town of Winchester at the confluence of the Still and Mad Rivers. This Mad River is one of seven rivers with the same name in New England, one other of which is also in Connecticut. The Still River continues north as a tributary of the Farmington River and is part of the Connecticut River watershed.

The city is laid out in a horseshoe-shaped valley ringed by seven hills; two other hills stand amid this, comprising a total of nine named hills.

There are five stone churches in a crescent from east to west. In their exact center is the Castle Tower Civil War monument, a stone tower of over 40 feet erected in 1890.

The city is crossed by U.S. Route 44, Route 8, Route 183 and Route 263. US 44 leads southeast 25 miles (40 km) to Hartford, the state capital, and northwest 17 miles (27 km) to North Canaan. Route 8 leads south 9 miles (14 km) to Torrington and 28 miles (45 km) to Waterbury, and north 26 miles (42 km) to U.S. Route 20 in West Becket, Massachusetts.

== Demographics ==
Historical population
Census	Pop.	Note	%±
2000	7,321		—
2010	7,712		5.3%
2020	7,192		−6.7%
Population 2000–2020.

As of the census of 2010, there were 7,712 people, 3,346 households, and 1,920 families residing in the CDP. The population density was 1,668 inhabitants per square mile (644/km^{2}). There were 3,828 housing units, of which 482, or 12.6%, were vacant. The racial makeup of the CDP was 91.6% White, 2.2% African American, 0.3% Native American, 1.3% Asian, 2.7% some other race, and 2.0% from two or more races. Hispanic or Latino people of any race were 6.5% of the population.

Of the 3,346 households in the community, 28.3% had children under the age of 18 living with them, 38.7% were headed by married couples living together, 13.6% had a female householder with no husband present, and 42.6% were non-families. 35.2% of all households were made up of individuals, and 13.4% were someone living alone who was 65 years of age or older. The average household size was 2.28, and the average family size was 2.95.

21.5% of the CDP population were under the age of 18, 8.7% were from 18 to 24, 24.6% were from 25 to 44, 30.1% were from 45 to 64, and 15.1% were 65 years of age or older. The median age was 41.3 years. For every 100 females, there were 94.4 males. For every 100 females age 18 and over, there were 92.2 males.

For the period 2013–2017, the estimated median annual income for a household in the CDP was $45,597, and the median income for a family was $58,962. Male full-time workers had a median income of $41,842 versus $45,208 for females. About 20.1% of families and 23.5% of the population were living below the poverty line, including 31.8% of people under the age of 18 and 13.0% of those age 65 or over.

== Public transportation ==
The closest major airport is Bradley International Airport (BDL), 24 miles (39 km) to the east in Windsor Locks, Connecticut. Amtrak stations within a 30-mile radius include Windsor (WND), Hartford (HFD), Berlin (BER), and Springfield, Massachusetts (SPG). Greyhound Lines also has a bus station.

Public transportation service is provided by the Northwestern Connecticut Transit District, which operates a weekday bus service and a dial-a-ride service.

== Arts and culture ==
Winsted is home to a growing number of arts and cultural organizations, including the arts and education center the American Mural Project, which holds the record for the largest indoor, collaborative mural in the world. Known in the 1800s as Winsted Hosiery, the largest hosiery manufacturer in the state, Whiting Mills is now home to 56 artisans, small businesses, and retail shops. Since its renovation in 2004, the mill received recognition from New England's Yankee Magazine as the "2016 Best Artists' Community in Connecticut,”"establishing the former factory building as a vibrant platform for the area's most creative artisans. Also here are the Ralph Nader's nonprofit American Museum of Tort Law, and the Winchester Historical Society.

== Education ==
Winchester Public Schools is the public school district, taking grades K-6, while the Gilbert School serves as the public school for grades 7–12. Prior to 2011, middle school students went to schools operated by the Winchester district.

Northwestern Regional School District No. 7 maintains Northwestern Regional High School, which is partly in Winsted. However, the school does not act as the public school for Winsted. Students who live in Winchester can attend Northwestern Regional High School through their Agricultural Education Program.

Also located in the town is Explorations Charter School. Created to serve a diverse body of students, the school was designed to accommodate the unique educational, social, and emotional needs of its students.

Prior to closing in 2020, the town also had a parochial Catholic school called St. Anthony School, of the Roman Catholic Diocese of Hartford. The school opened in 1865, and maintained a class of around 200 students. Experiencing a large decrease in enrollment, the school dropped from serving around 200 students, to just 90. When in operation, it was the oldest school continually operated by the archdiocese.

Northwestern Connecticut Community College is also located in Winsted.

Beardsley Library and the Memorial Library is the local public library. Mrs. Eliot Beardsley donated $10,000 to establish the library. The buying of the land was funded by Jenison Whiting, who submitted a bequest in 1898, with the first building built the following year.

== Notable people ==
- Crane Brinton, historian
- James J. Casey, politician
- Guy Gilchrist, cartoonist
- James P. Glynn, congressman
- John Groppo, businessman and politician
- David Halberstam, journalist and author
- Mason Hale, educator
- Samuel B. Horne (1843–1928), Medal of Honor recipient in the American Civil War, entered service in Winsted and is buried there
- Arphaxed Loomis, congressman
- Ralph Nader, author and activist
- Rose Nader, activist
- Henry R. Pease, senator
- Charles H. Smith, historian of science
- James Wakefield (1825–1910), congressman
