= Creep =

Creep, Creeps, CREEP, or Creeping may refer to:

== Arts, entertainment, and media ==
=== Films ===
- Creeps (film), a 1956 short starring the Three Stooges
- The Creeps (film), a 1997 film directed by Charles Band
- Creep (2004 film), a 2004 British-German horror film
- Creep (2014 film), an American found-footage horror film
  - Creep 2, a 2017 American found-footage horror film; sequel to the 2014 film
- The Creeping (film), a 2022 British horror film

=== Television ===
- "The Creeps", an episode of the TV series Adventure Time

=== Gaming ===
- "Creep", a carpet of bio-matter Zerg colonies produce in the StarCraft video game franchise
- The Creeps!, a 2008 tower defense video game

=== Literature ===
- Creeps (novel), a 2013 young adult novel by Darren Hynes
- The Creeping (novel), a 2015 young adult novel by Alexandra Sirowy

=== Music ===
==== Groups ====
- Creep (band), an American electronic music band
- The Creeps, a 1980s Swedish band that won the Rockbjörnen prize in 1990
- The Creeps, a 1960s South African band featuring David Kramer

==== Albums ====
- Creeps, 2015 album from Indian Handcrafts

==== Songs ====
- "Creep" (Mobb Deep song)
- "Creep" (Radiohead song)
- "Creep" (Stone Temple Pilots song)
- "Creep" (TLC song)
- "The Creep" (song), by the Lonely Island
- "The Creeps" (Camille Jones song), remixed by, among others, Fedde le Grand
- "The Creeps (Get on the Dancefloor)", song by the Freaks
- "Creeping" (song), a 2018 single by Lil Skies featuring Rich the Kid
- "Creepin'" (Eric Church song), 2011
- "Creepin'", (Kingswood song), 2016
- "Creepin'" (Metro Boomin, the Weeknd and 21 Savage song), 2023
- "Creep", a song by Dannii Minogue on the album Neon Nights
- "C.R.E.E.P.", a song by the Fall
- "The Creep", a 1950s instrumental by Ken Mackintosh
- "Creepin'", a 1974 song by Stevie Wonder from his album Fulfillingness' First Finale
- "Creeps Like Me", a 1994 song by Lyle Lovett (from I Love Everybody)

=== Theatre ===
- Creeps (play), a 1971 play by David E. Freeman

== Project management ==
- Feature creep, the gradual and unmanaged addition of features to software
- Instruction creep, the gradual and unmanaged addition of unnecessary instructions
- Job creep, the gradual and unmanaged addition of job responsibilities
- Mission creep, the gradual and unmanaged addition of additional tasks in a mission
- Scope creep, the gradual and unmanaged addition of additional tasks in a project

== Science ==
- Creep (deformation), the tendency of a solid material to slowly move or deform permanently under the influence of stresses
  - Coble creep
  - Diffusion creep
  - Dislocation creep
  - Nabarro–Herring creep
- Creep, the advancing of a railway wheel more or less than is expected from rolling, without large-scale slip; see rail adhesion
  - Idle creep, the tendency of a car with an automatic transmission to roll without the brakes engaged or the gear set to neutral
- Creeping wave, a type of electromagnetic diffraction
- Aseismic creep, a slow, steady movement along an earthquake fault
- Chip creep, phenomenon of chips moving out of sockets
- Downhill creep, the slow progression of soil and rock down a low-grade slope
- Location creep, an erratic effect in real-time locating systems
- Superfluid creep, the tendency for a superfluid to "crawl" up the walls of its container; see Superfluidity

== Other ==
- Creepiness, causing a feeling of unease
- Creeping attack, war tactic used against submarines
- Creeping normality, process by which a change can be accepted through happening slowly
- Creeping Jesus, pejorative term for someone making public display of religiosity or piety in a manner which seems hypocritical and simply for show
- Ad creep, process of increasing advertising over time
- Cattle creep, a type of accessway between fields for livestock
- Christmas creep, phenomenon of Christmas merchandising before the holiday season
- Committee for the Re-Election of the President (CRP), mockingly abbreviated as CREEP, a fundraising organization for Richard Nixon's 1972 re-election campaign
- Concept creep, the expansion of a concept to include increasing amounts of topics
- Creep feeding, method of supplementing the diet of nursing livestock
- Fader creep, sound engineering phenomenon
- Lifestyle creep, social phenomenon through which former luxuries become perceived as necessities due to a higher standard of living
- Zoom creep, photography phenomenon

== See also ==
- Creeper (disambiguation)
- Creepshow (disambiguation)
- Creepy (disambiguation)
- KREEP (coined from abbreviations for "potassium", "rare-earth elements", and "phosphorus"), component of some lunar rocks
