= Creeper =

Creeper, Creepers, or The Creeper may refer to:

== Plants and animals ==
- Creepers, birds of several songbird families:
  - the Certhiidae treecreepers
  - the Climacteridae Australasian treecreeper
  - the Mohouidae Brown creeper (New Zealand)
  - the Rhabdornithidae Philippine creeper
    - Long-billed creeper
    - Stripe-breasted creeper
    - Stripe-headed creeper
- Creepers, various vines, particularly species in the genus Parthenocissus

== Arts, entertainment, and media ==
=== Fictional characters ===
- Creeper (DC Comics), a DC Comics character
- Creeper (Minecraft), creatures found within the video game Minecraft
- Creeper, a fictional hard rock band from 2002 Canadian film Fubar
- Creeper, a spirit character in the 2005 video game The Suffering: Ties That Bind
- Creepers, mechanical monsters in the Shannara fantasy novels
- Creepers, fictional caterpillar-like creatures featured in the film Mickey 17
- The Creeper, a character played by Rondo Hatton in several horror movies
- The Creeper, a creature in the 2001 horror film Jeepers Creepers
- The Creeper, a monster disguise in the Scooby-Doo franchise

=== Films ===
- The Creeper (film), a 1948 horror film
- Phenomena (film), a 1985 horror film by Dario Argento, also released as Creepers
- The Crawlers (film), a 1993 Italian horror film by Joe D'Amato and Fabrizio Laurenti, also called Creepers
- Do Not Enter (upcoming film), an American horror film in production since 2022, directed by Marc Klasfeld, originally titled Creepers

=== Music ===
==== Groups ====
- Creeper (band), an English horror punk band
- The Creepers, an English rock band

==== Recordings ====
- Creeper (EP), by the band Creeper
- The Creeper (album), a 1981 jazz album by trumpeter Donald Byrd
- "The Creeper", a song on the 2002 album Safety, Fun, and Learning (In That Order) by We Are Scientists
- "Creepers", a song by Kid Cudi from the album Cruel Summer, 2012

=== Other uses in arts, entertainment, and media ===
- Creepers (novel), a 2006 novel by David Morrell
- Creepers (video game), by Psygnosis
- The Creeper (novel), a 2024 crime novel by Margaret Hickey
- "The Creeper", a 2009 episode of Midsomer Murders

== Other uses ==
- Creeper (program), a 1971 early self-replicating computer program
- Creeper (tool), a low-profile, wheeled platform used by auto mechanics
- Creeper, an infant bodysuit, a one-piece article of infant clothing
- Brothel creepers or creepers, a type of shoe
- CREEPER (Curbing Realistic Exploitative Electronic Pedophilic Robots), a US Act about sex robots

== See also ==
- Creep (disambiguation)
- The Kreeper, a nickname given to the American rapper and record producer Kirk Knight
