= Ratchet effect =

Restrained ability of human process reversal

A mechanical ratchet moving in its "forward" direction and unable to move backward.

The ratchet effect is a concept in sociology and economics illustrating the difficulty with reversing a course of action once a specific thing has occurred, analogous with the mechanical ratchet that allows movement in one direction and seizes or tightens in the opposite. The concept has been applied to multiple fields of study and is related to the phenomena of scope creep, mission creep, and feature creep.

== Background ==
The ratchet effect first came to light in Alan Peacock and Jack Wiseman's 1961 report "The Growth of Public Expenditure in the United Kingdom." Peacock and Wiseman found that public spending increases like a ratchet following periods of crisis.

The term was later expanded upon by American historian Robert Higgs in the 1987 book Crisis and Leviathan, highlighting Peacock and Wiseman's research as it relates to governments experiencing difficulty in rolling back huge bureaucratic organizations created initially for temporary needs, such as wartime measures, natural disasters, or economic crises.

The effect may likewise afflict large businesses with myriad layers of bureaucracy which resist reform or dismantling. In workplaces, "ratchet effects refer to the tendency for central controllers to base next year's targets on last year's performance, meaning that managers who expect still to be in place in the next target period have a perverse incentive not to exceed targets even if they could easily do so."

== Applications ==
=== Famine cycle ===
Garrett Hardin, a biologist and environmentalist, used the phrase to describe how food aid keeps people alive who would otherwise die in a famine. They live and multiply in better times, making another bigger crisis inevitable, since the supply of food has not been increased.

=== Production strategy ===
Jean Tirole used the concept in his pioneering work on regulation and monopolies. The ratchet effect can denote an economic strategy arising in an environment where incentive depends on both current and past production, such as in a competitive industry employing piece rates. The producers observe that since incentive is readjusted based on their production, any increase in production confers only a temporary increase in incentive while requiring a permanently greater expenditure of work. They therefore decide not to reveal hidden production capacity unless forced to do so.

=== Game theory ===
The ratchet effect is central to the mathematical Parrondo's paradox.

=== Anthropology ===
In 1999 comparative psychologist Michael Tomasello used the ratchet effect metaphor to shed light on the evolution of culture. He explains that the sharedness of human culture means that it is cumulative in character. Once a certain invention has been made, it can jump from one mind to another (by means of imitation) and thus a whole population can acquire a new trait (and so the ratchet has gone "up" one tooth). Comparative psychologist Claudio Tennie, Tomasello, and Josep Call call this the "cultural ratchet" and they describe it, amongst primates, as being unique to human culture.

=== Developmental biology ===
Receptors which initiate cell fate transduction cascades, in early embryo development, exhibit a ratchet effect in response to morphogen concentrations. The low receptor occupancy permits increases in receptor occupancy which alter the cell fate, but the high receptor affinity does not allow ligand dissociation leading to a cell fate of a lower concentration.

=== Technology regulation ===
The ratchet effect is reflected in the Collingridge dilemma.

=== Consumer products ===
The ratchet effect can be seen in long-term trends in the production of many consumer goods. Year by year, automobiles gradually acquire more features. Competitive pressures make it hard for manufacturers to cut back on the features unless forced by a true scarcity of raw materials (e.g., an oil shortage that drives costs up radically). University textbook publishers gradually get "stuck" in producing books that have excess content and features.

In software development, products that compete often will use specification lists of competitive products to add features, presuming that they must provide all of the features of the competitive product, plus add additional functionality. This can lead to "feature creep" in which it is considered necessary to add all of a competitor's features whether or not customers will use them.

Airlines initiate frequent-flyer programs that become ever harder to terminate. Successive generations of home appliances gradually acquire more features; new editions of software acquire more features; and so on. With all of these goods, there is ongoing debate as to whether the added features truly improve usability, or simply increase the tendency for people to buy the goods.

=== Trade legislation ===
The term was included by the MAI Negotiating Group in the 1990s as the essence of a device to enforce legislative progress toward "free trade" by preventing legislative rollback with the compulsory assent of governments as a condition of participation.

Rollback is the liberalisation process by which the reduction and eventual elimination of nonconforming measures to the MAI would take place. It is a dynamic element linked with standstill, which provides its starting point. Combined with standstill, it would produce a "ratchet effect", where any new liberalisation measures would be "locked in" so they could not be rescinded or nullified over time.

== See also ==
- Argument to moderation
- Muller's ratchet
- Tragedy of the commons
- Collingridge dilemma
- Brownian ratchet
- Maxwell’s demon
