= Creepshow (disambiguation) =

Creepshow is a 1982 American comedy horror anthology film.

Creepshow may also refer to:

== Film and television ==
- Creepshow 2, a 1987 American comedy horror anthology film
- Creepshow 3, a 2006 American horror film, and a sequel to the horror anthology classics Creepshow and Creepshow 2
- Creepshow (TV series), a 2019 horror anthology web television series

== Music ==
- The Creepshow, a band from Burlington, Ontario, Canada
- Creepshow, an album by Xiu Xiu and Grouper
- Creepshow (soundtrack), 1982 soundtrack album for the film
- Creepshow 2 (soundtrack), 1987 soundtrack album for the film
- "Creepshow", a single by Kerli from the album Love Is Dead
- "Creepshow", a song by Skid Row from the album Slave to the Grind

== Other uses ==
- Creepshow (comics), a graphic novella based on the film of the same name

== See also ==
- Creep (disambiguation)
- Freakshow (disambiguation)
