= Legislation =

Legislative or parliamentary law

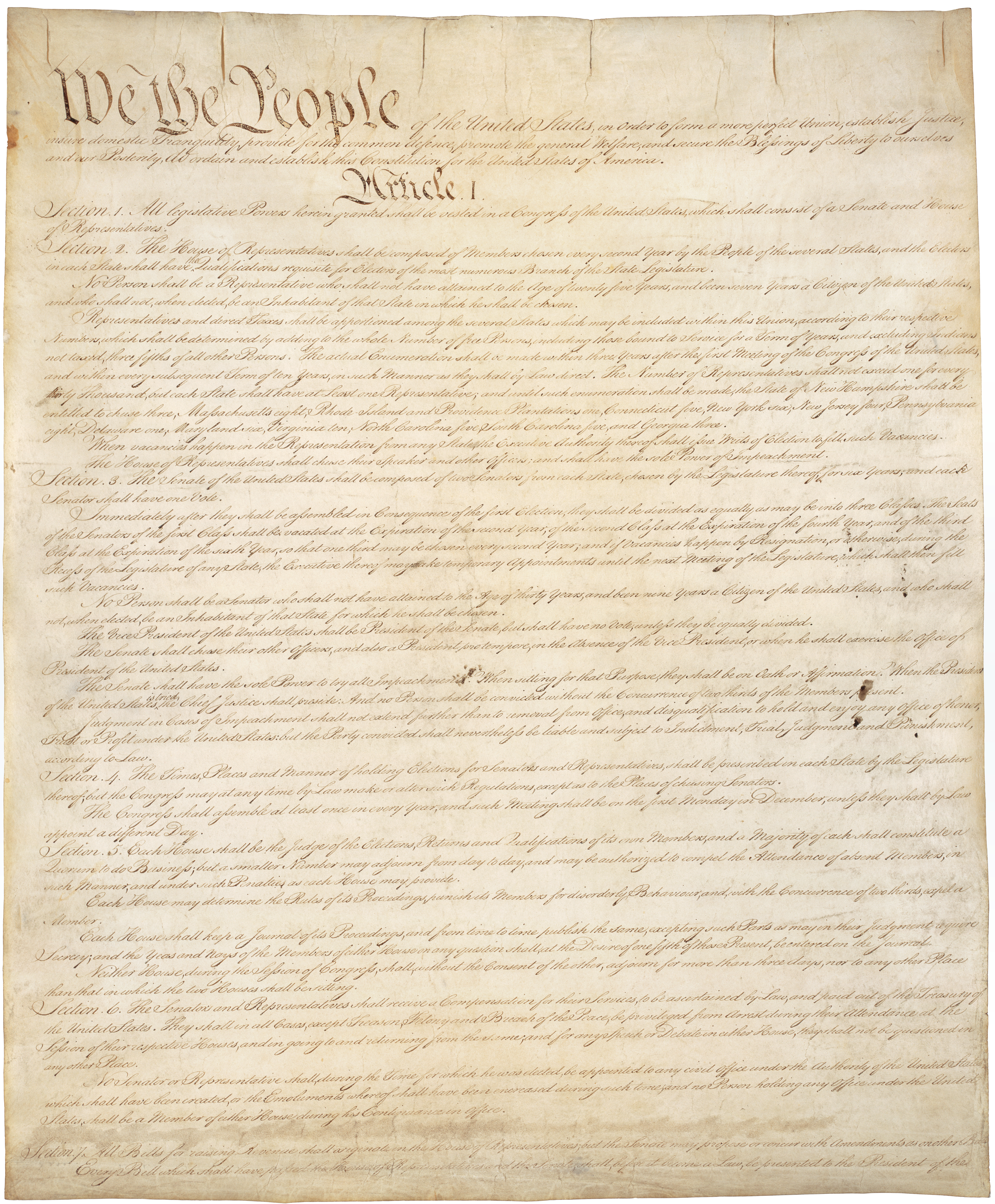
Constitution of the United States, page 1

Legislation is the process or result of enrolling, enacting, or promulgating laws by a legislature, parliament, or analogous governing body. Before an item of legislation becomes law it may be known as a bill, and may be broadly referred to as "legislation" while it remains under consideration to distinguish it from other business. Legislation can have many purposes: to regulate, to authorize, to outlaw, to provide (funds), to sanction, to grant, to declare, or to restrict. It may be contrasted with a non-legislative act by an executive or administrative body under the authority of a legislative act.

== Overview ==
Legislation to design or amend a bill requires identifying a concrete issue in a comprehensive way. When engaging in legislation, drafters and policy-makers must take into consideration the best possible avenues to address problem areas. Possible solutions within bill provisions might involve implementing sanctions, targeting indirect behaviors, authorizing agency action, etc.

Legislation is usually proposed by a member of the legislature (e.g. a member of Congress or Parliament), or by the executive, whereupon it is debated by members of the legislature and is often amended before passage. Most large legislatures enact only a small fraction of the bills proposed in a given session. Whether a given bill will be proposed is generally a matter of the legislative priorities of the government.

Legislation is regarded as one of the three main functions of government, which are often distinguished under the doctrine of the separation of powers. Those who have the formal power to create legislation are known as legislators; a judicial branch of government will have the formal power to interpret legislation (see statutory interpretation); the executive branch of government can act only within the powers and limits set by the law, which is the instrument by which the fundamental powers of government are established.

The function and procedures are primarily the responsibility of the legislature. However, there are situations where legislation is made by other bodies or means, such as when constitutional law or secondary legislation is enacted. Such other forms of law-making include referendums, orders in council or regulations. The term legislation is sometimes used to include these situations, or the term primary legislation may be used to exclude these other forms.

=== Public participation in legislation ===
All modern constitutions and fundamental laws contain and declare the concept and principle of popular sovereignty, which essentially means that the people are the ultimate source of public power or government authority. The concept of popular sovereignty holds simply that in a society organized for political action, the will of the people as a whole is the only right standard of political action. It can be regarded as an important element in the system of checks and balances and representative democracy. Therefore, the people are implicitly entitled even to directly participate in the process of law-making. This role of linking citizens and their government and legislators is closely related to the concept of legitimacy. The exercise of democratic control over the legislative system and the policy-making process can occur even when the public has only an elementary understanding of the national legislative institution and its membership. Civic education is a vital strategy for strengthening public participation and confidence in the legislative process.

== Dead letter ==
The term "dead letter" refers to legislation that has not been revoked, but that has become inapplicable or obsolete, or is no longer enforced. In more simple terms, it means that the legislation is gone. There are several types of dead letter laws. Some laws become obsolete because they are so hateful to their community that no one wishes them to be enforced (e.g., slavery). Similarly, some laws are unenforced because a majority wishes to circumvent them, even if they believe in the moral principle behind the law (e.g., prohibition). Finally, some laws are unenforced because no mechanism or resources were provided to enforce them. Such laws often become selectively enforced or tacked onto other crimes in the judicial process.

== See also ==
- Rollback (legislation)
- Rule according to higher law
