= Freakshow =

Freakshow most commonly refers to freak show, an exhibition of rarities.

Freakshow or Freak show may also refer to:

== Arts, entertainment, and media ==
=== Fictional characters ===
- Freakshow (comics), a Marvel Comics character
- Freakshow (Danny Phantom), a character from the TV show Danny Phantom
- Freakshow, a character played by Christopher Meloni from the film Harold & Kumar Go to White Castle

=== Films ===
- Freak Show (film), a 2017 American LGBT drama film
- Freakshow (1989 film), a Canadian horror film starring Dan Gallagher
- Freakshow (film), a 2007 horror film

=== Music ===
==== Albums and soundtracks ====
- Freak Show (album), a 1997 album by Silverchair
- Freek Show, a 2000 album by horrorcore rap group Twiztid
- Freakshow (BulletBoys album), a 1991 album by BulletBoys
- Freakshow (The Killer Barbies album), a 2004 DVD/CD set released by The Killer Barbies
- Freak Show (G-Eazy album), a 2024 album by G-Eazy
- Freak Show/Freak Show Soundtrack, a 1991 album and interactive CD by The Residents

==== Songs ====
- "Freakshow" (The Cure song), a 2008 single by The Cure
- "Freakshow", song by Britney Spears from the album Blackout
- "Freakshow", song by The Gothic Archies from the album The Tragic Treasury
- "Freak Show", song by Ingrid Michaelson from the album Stranger Songs
- "Freak Show", song by Zebrahead from the album Walk the Plank

=== Television ===
- Freak Show (TV series), a cartoon series
- Freakshow (TV series), a reality series
- American Horror Story: Freak Show, fourth season of American Horror Story
- "Freakshow" (Legends of Tomorrow), an episode of Legends of Tomorrow
- "Freak Show" (Space Ghost Coast to Coast), an episode of Space Ghost Coast to Coast

=== Other uses in arts, entertainment, and media ===
- Freak Show, a 2007 novel about a teenage drag queen by James St. James
- Freakshow (audio drama), a Doctor Who audio drama

== Other uses ==
- Freak Show, a nickname for the 1997 Pittsburgh Pirates season

== See also ==
- Creepshow (disambiguation)
