= Creepy (disambiguation) =

Creepy is something that causes an unpleasant feeling of fear or unease.

Creepy may also refer to:

== Arts and entertainment ==
- Creepy (band), an indie rock/pop punk band
- Creepy (film), a 2016 Japanese film
- Creepy (magazine), a horror comics magazine published from 1964 to 1983

== People ==
- Creepy Crespi (1918–1990), American Major League Baseball player
- Creepy, nickname of Alvin Karpis (1907–1979), Canadian-born American gangster
- Creepy, nickname of John Crawley (born 1971), English cricketer
- "Uncle Creepy", nickname of Ian McCall (born 1984), American mixed martial artist

== See also ==
- Creep (disambiguation)
- The Creepy EP, an EP by Relient K
