= Multilateral Agreement on Investment =

Proposed OECD agreement

The Multilateral Agreement on Investment (MAI) was a draft agreement negotiated in secret between members of the Organisation for Economic Co-operation and Development (OECD) between 1995 and 1998. It sought to establish a new body of universal investment laws that would grant corporations unconditional rights to engage in financial operations around the world, without any regard to national laws and citizens' rights. The draft gave corporations a right to sue governments if national health, labor or environment legislation threatened their interests. When its draft became public in 1997, it drew widespread criticism from civil society groups and developing countries, particularly over the possibility that the agreement would make it difficult to regulate foreign investors. After an intense global campaign was waged against the MAI by the treaty's critics, the host nation France announced in October 1998 that it would not support the agreement, effectively preventing its adoption due to the OECD's consensus procedures.

== Background ==
International direct investment has been taking place in various forms and to different degrees for over a century. Attempts to establish a framework for the protection of foreign investments dates back to the 1920s, most notably negotiating a League of Nations draft convention. Starting from the second half of the twentieth century, the investment protection was developed through the bilateral investment treaties (BIT), which are signed between two countries and which state the desired conditions under which investment can take place between them. The first BIT, between West Germany and Pakistan, was signed in 1959 and their numbers have grown steadily since then, although research suggests that BITs do little to increase foreign investment. In 1965, the International Centre for Settlement of Investment Disputes (ICSID) was established in the framework of the United Nations, and in 1967, the OECD prepared the Draft Convention on the Protection of Foreign Property although this was not adopted.

The number of bilateral investment agreements increased rapidly during the 1990s as countries and investors sought more regulation for security, certainty and mobility for their investments after it became clear that the Uruguay Round's Agreement on Trade Related Investment Measures (TRIMS), Agreement on Trade-Related Aspects of Intellectual Property Rights (TRIPS) and General Agreement on Trade in Services (GATS) addressed only part of investment-related concerns and did not provide enough security for investors nor strong controls on host governments to regulate multinational corporations. In addition to these instruments, in 1992 the World Bank adopted Guidelines on the Treatment of Foreign Direct Investment. In 1994 the Energy Charter Treaty provided an example of a multilateral investment agreement, though limited to the energy sector.

Noam Chomsky argued that the OECD, as an organization made up solely of rich countries, was more susceptible to direct influence by transnational corporate forces than alternative fora with more universal membership such as United Nations Conference on Trade and Development (UNCTAD) and the World Trade Organization (WTO).

== Purposes and provisions ==
While authorizing the negotiations, the OECD Ministerial Council aimed to reach a "broad multilateral framework for international investment with high standards for the liberalization of investment regimes and investment protection and with effective dispute-settlement procedures". The aim was to create more consistent, secure and stable investment conditions and to regulate investment in a more uniform, transparent and enforceable manner. Although the agreement was to be negotiated between the member states, the intention was to have an open agreement to which non-OECD members could accede on a negotiated basis.

According to MAI supporter Sergio Marchi, who was Canada's Minister of International Trade at the time, one of the main purposes of the agreement was to eliminate the "patchwork" of investment rules enshrined in the then-1300+ bilateral investment treaties. Contrary to many critics, he argued that the MAI would help prevent a "race to the bottom" that would undermine high standards of Canadian regulation. More specifically, the agreement would:

- Minimise the diverse state regulations in governing the conditions under which investments by foreign corporations could take place. (In this connection, the agreement embodied acceptance of a compliance regime under which liberalization must proceed forward with no ability to be wound back — the so-called ratchet effect. This would be enforced by so-called rollback and standstill provisions, to ensure that investors would have access to markets. These provisions required nations to eliminate regulations that violated MAI provisions — either immediately or over a set period of time — and to refrain from passing any such laws in the future.)
- Enable compensation to corporations for proven unfair or discriminatory investment conditions causing loss of profit.
- Allow states and corporations recourse to international arbitration (for instance, through the International Centre for Settlement of Investment Disputes) to settle any disputes arising under the agreement, instead of national courts in the host state.

The MAI was supported by both the Business and Industry Advisory Committee to the OECD (BIAC) and the Trade Union Advisory Committee to the OECD (TUAC). While BIAC was interested in stable and consistent treatment of investment, TUAC was interested on setting standards on employment and industrial relations.

== Negotiations ==
The negotiations on the Multilateral Agreement on Investment were formally launched by the OECD's Ministerial Council in May 1995 and they commenced in September 1995. The negotiations were carried out by a high-level negotiating group consisting of officials from the OECD member states, but working outside the OECD committee structure consulting with the non-member countries. The chairperson of the negotiating group was Frans Engering (Netherlands) and vice-chairpersons were Al Larson (United States) and A. Saiki (Japan). The target deadline to finish the negotiations, set by the OECD Ministerial Council, was mid-1997.

There was little public awareness of the details of MAI negotiations until a draft of the agreement was leaked in March 1997. The leaked material prompted criticism from different NGOs globally. As a result, the negotiations failed in 1998 when first France and then other countries successively withdrew after pressure from a global movement of NGOs, citizens' groups and a number of governments of developing countries. In April 1998, the negotiations were formally suspended for six months. On 3 December 1998, the OECD announced that "negotiations on the MAI are no longer taking place".

== Protest movement ==
Multinational corporations (MNCs) enjoy enormous structural and resource advantages over employees and citizens. Yet when the MNCs and major governments tried to expand those advantages through the Multilateral Agreement on Investment (MAI), they were stymied by a global alliance of activists. MAI opponents made heavy use of electronic mail and the World Wide Web in raising the alert, sharing information and coordinating actions. They worked collaboratively, flexibly and imaginatively towards their goals while MNCs and governments were working secretively and within more traditional hierarchical models.

The international protests against the MAI were the first example of such mass-activism to deploy the Internet. The internet was central both in gathering information and in promulgating critical materials among members of a vast worldwide network. The movement's main argument was that the most influential mass media and politicians had vested interests in the MAI. Even their opponents ruefully acknowledged that the activists possessed highly qualified, eloquent analysts and leaders—and were able to use the new internet technology to devastating effect. French MEP Catherine Lalumière stated: "These organisations have refined and diffused to all countries an anti-MAI position which is now expressed in similar terms throughout the diverse countries of the OECD."

=== Active opposition ===
According to Theodore H. Cohn in Global Political Economy Theory and Practice (2005), "[t]he most effective opposition to the MAI was launched by a wide-ranging coalition of civil society NGOs. These NGOs argued that the MAI would threaten protection of human rights, labor and environmental standards, and least developed countries. A particular concern was that the MAI would result in a "race to the bottom" among countries willing to lower their labor and environmental standards to attract foreign investment. The origin of organised opposition was traced by Katia Tieleman in her 2000 UN case study:

[T]he start of the opposition against the MAI can be traced back to a couple of individuals, [who] remained the leading figures in its further development. By the end of 1996, Martin Khor, Director of the Third World Network based in Malaysia, obtained a document prepared for the OECD Ministerial meeting of May 1995 as well as for future WTO negotiations by the European Commission (Commission of the European Communities 1995: A Level Playing Field for Direct Investment World Wide, March 1, Brussels). From the document, Mr. Khor understood that multilateral investment negotiations, which his organisation as part of a large coalition opposed at the WTO, might be ongoing at the OECD. He informed some NGO colleagues, among whom was Tony Clarke, Director of the Polaris Institute in Canada.

Tony Clarke managed to get a copy of the MAI draft. After turning "the text into a readable document and adding an analysis and interpretation" [sourced to interview with Tony Clarke, Brussels, April 28], he posted it to an international email distribution list about globalization called le Forum international sur la globalization in February 1997.

In the United States, the NGO Public Citizen Global Watch put the draft on its web page. Lori Wallach, a graduate of Harvard Law School, became one of the strongest leading organizers of the international campaign against the MAI. Building on the credibility of her status as a lawyer, she transformed the legal OECD documents into accessible wording, often "ready for use" in the subsequent NGO campaigns. Her role as provider of information combined with her role as provider of explanation gave her a power-position in the campaign. She would launch the campaign under the name of the "Dracula Strategy" implying that simply exposing the MAI project to the light would be sufficient to kill it (sourced to an interview with Susan George). NGOs showed that they were well interconnected. In no time, the document was distributed and action was taken in different parts of the world. The campaign against the MAI was born.

Using a variety of websites, NGOs mobilized a strong and diverse opposition composed of human rights groups, labor and environmental groups, and consumer advocates.

=== Arguments ===
MAI opponents pointed to a perceived threat to national sovereignty and democracy and argued that it would involve participating nations in a "race to the bottom" in environmental and labor standards. The MAI prompted criticism that it appeared to establish a new body of universal investment laws to guarantee corporations excessive powers to buy, sell and undertake financial operations all over the world, severely diluting national laws, e.g., on environmental protection, regulation of labour standards and human rights established in developed countries. By their arguments, the draft proposed a North American Free Trade Agreement-style investor-state dispute settlement tribunal in which corporations could sue governments if legislation (e.g., for national health, labor or environment), threatened their interests or were considered to expropriate actual or potential assets and/or profits.

Mark Vallianatos, of Friends of the Earth, argued that:

- The MAI would restrict governments' ability to limit the participation of foreign multinationals in industries. "For example," he wrote, "the Philippines currently bans foreign investment in rural banking, and Honduras limits foreign investors in forestry to a minority stake". These restrictions would not be acceptable within the MAI.
- The agreement would establish the principle of "national treatment" (in which government must treat foreign companies as favorably as domestic companies) as the norm for international investment. Indeed, in some cases, foreign corporations might have stronger protections than domestic investors. "The MAI bars many types of performance requirements, or conditions, even if those conditions are imposed on local companies. Examples of forbidden conditions include requiring investors to form a partnership with a local company and requiring a minimum number of local employees—the types of policies governments use to help ensure that local people benefit from foreign investment."
- "The MAI matters because its rules can be enforced. If a foreign investor thinks a country where it has invested is violating the MAI, the investor has a choice: to complain to its own government, which can take the host country to binding international arbitration, or to directly challenge the host country. In either case, the arbitration process is closed.

== Some component country campaigns ==
=== Canada ===
Contributors to the MAI-NOT newsgroup, including Maude Barlow, mounted a campaign with the active backing of the Council of Canadians which had earlier opposed the 1994 North American Free Trade Agreement (NAFTA) between the USA, Canada and Mexico.

In Montreal, on May 25, 1998, the Montreal Conference on Globalized Economies was nonviolently blockaded for five hours by hundreds of activists in what was called Operation SalAMI, based on the French acronym of the proposed agreement, AMI, referring not only the sausage, but also to a "dirty friend". Operation SalAMI demanded that Canada withdraw from the negotiations on the MAI. The presence of one key MAI player, Donald Johnston (General Secretary of the OECD) at the conference helped to focus the action, one of the three most important anti-MAI events in the world. These mobilizations on an international scale actually led to the shelving of the agreement. The award-winning documentary Pressure Point: Inside the Montreal Blockade recorded the drama of this action where 100 people were arrested.

=== United States ===
A strong campaign was led by Lori Wallach of Public Citizen's Global Trade Watch, and a coordinated network ("50 Years is Enough') including Friends of the Earth, the Alliance for Democracy, Witness for Peace, the Sierra Club, the Preamble Center, the Democratic Socialists of America and other groups.

=== Australia ===
In November 1997, the Australian Broadcasting Corporation's radio programme "Background Briefing" presented the Quiet Debate (transcript) —a report about the silence of the Australian government and media on an issue which was arousing fierce controversy in the United States, Britain, Canada and New Zealand. However, Australian activists, including supporters of Pauline Hanson, were already studying the leaked MAI draft and corresponding with the Canadian email discussion group MAI-NOT while deciding how to organise a national campaign to link with those of other countries. In January 1998 a national "STOP MAI" coalition was formed to research issues, lobby parliamentarians and conduct public meetings. In November 1998, prior to the opening of OECD negotiations in Paris, the coalition delivered to the meeting's chairman and to the Australian prime minister a protest letter endorsed by over 500 organisations and individuals. The letter was reinforced by a prominent advertisement in The Australian newspaper on 11 November 1998.

=== France ===
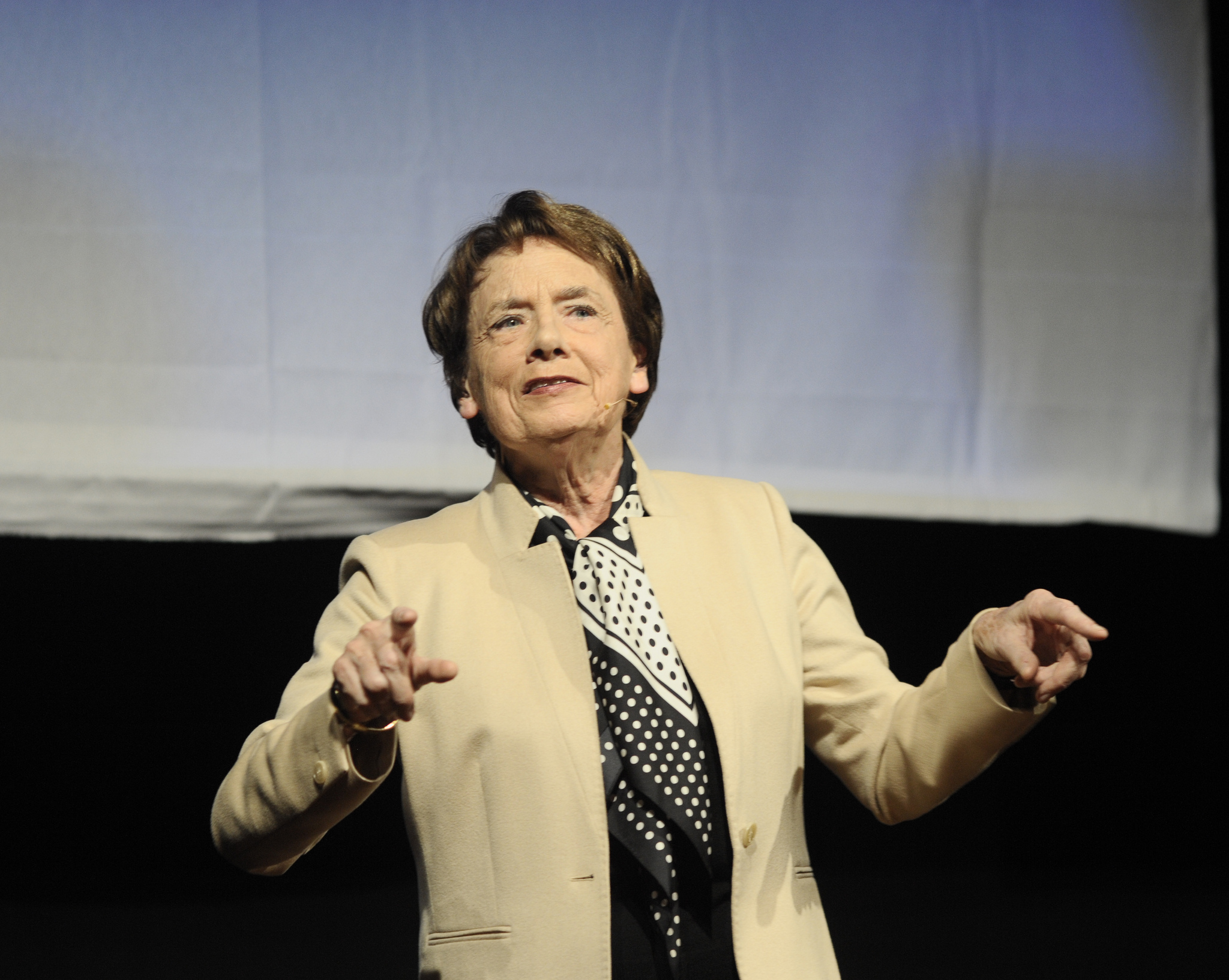
Catherine Lalumière

France's withdrawal followed consideration of a report on the negotiations drawn up by a French MEP, Catherine Lalumière. After receiving this report, prime minister Lionel Jospin addressed the Assemblée Nationale on 10 October 1998 and announced his decision to withdraw. He said the Lalumière Report had identified a number of fundamental problems with the agreement, particularly relating to matters of national sovereignty. Madame Lalumière had also concluded that so many reservations were being incorporated into the agreement that any value for French investors would be limited. M. Jospin noted that, in February 1998, the French government had identified respect for cultural differences as a requirement for French support for the agreement. In particular, he was concerned that the French film industry needed protection against US imports.

Of equal or greater significance was the importance accorded by Mme. Lalumière to the global protest movement which at that time she attributed to the work and influence of NGOs:

For the first time, one is seeing the emergence of a global civil society represented by NGOs which are often based in several states and communicate beyond their frontiers. This evolution is doubtless irreversible. On one hand, organisations representing civil society have become aware of the consequences of international economic negotiations. They are determined to leave their mark on them. Furthermore, the development of the internet has shaken up the environment of the negotiations. It allows the instant diffusion of the texts under discussion, whose confidentiality becomes more and more theoretical. It permits, beyond national boundaries, the sharing of knowledge and expertise. On a subject which is highly technical, the representatives of civil society seemed to us perfectly well informed, and their criticisms well argued on a legal level.

Mme. Lalumière argued, however, that France should continue to pursue further liberalisation of investment régimes though not in the OECD. "On the one hand, under these conditions it would be impossible to achieve the balancing of the concessions demanded by the firms and, on the other, the objections of the opponents would be just as fierce." France was followed by a succession of other nations including Canada and Australia whose governments had been under relentless pressure from civil society to abandon or radically revamp the MAI.

== Subsequent developments ==
Proponents of MAI (such as the United States, Canada, and several EU members) continue to promote investment provisions similar to MAI through regional trade agreements, bilateral investment treaties, bilateral free-trade agreements and discussion at the World Trade Organization to be incorporated into the General Agreement on Trade in Services. Before the end of 1998, the UK trade minister Brian Wilson began to announce that investment negotiations could be shifted to the WTO.

The UK Government appears to be taking a surprisingly complacent approach towards the WTO. When the MAI collapsed, then Trade Minister Brian Wilson appeared to have understood some of the concerns raised. He called for any new negotiations to start with a 'blank sheet of paper' based on objectives which should 'take full account of social and environmental concerns'. Yet despite these undertakings, the Government is pushing for the WTO to cover foreign investment according to the same principles. It is a driving force behind the EU proposal on investment. In doing so it is ignoring the widespread opposition to the MAI and the mounting evidence of the WTO's abject failings.

A senior treasury officer, cited in a 1999 Australian parliamentary report, stated that "any future work on the matter known as the MAI needed to address the OECD Ministers' requirement to protect the sovereign right to regulate and to ensure citizens were not harmed by efforts to liberalise foreign investment. There was also a need to continue to engage "civil society", and to expand participation in the process by countries that were not members of the OECD".

An attempt was made to insert the investment agenda into a new "Millennium Round" of trade liberalisation talks to be hosted by the World Trade Organization (WTO). This led to the historic "Battle of Seattle" protest actions in November 1999. At the WTO Ministerial in Cancún, Mexico, in September 2003, a group of more than twenty developing countries united to block the inclusion of the Singapore issues, including investments, in the Doha Round of trade talks. One basis of such opposition is outlined in a critical analysis prepared for Canadian universities.

The OECD promotes the Declaration on International Investment and Multinational Enterprises and the OECD Guidelines for Multinational Enterprises, last revised in 2011. In addition, from May 2006, the OECD has promoted a non-binding set of "good practices" for attracting investment, known as The Policy Framework for Investment (PFI).

== See also ==
- Bilateral investment treaty
- Foreign direct investment
- International Centre for Settlement of Investment Disputes
- United Nations Conference on Trade and Development
- General Agreement on Tariffs and Trade (GATT)
- World Trade Organization
