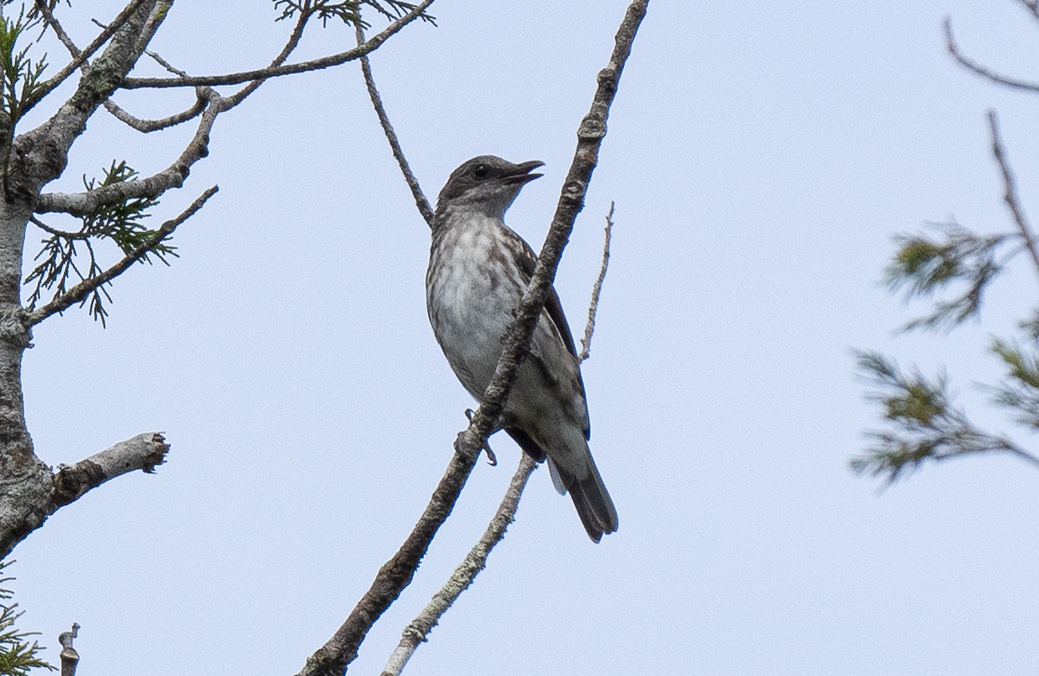

Conservation status
- Least Concern (IUCN 3.1)

Scientific classification
- Kingdom: Animalia
- Phylum: Chordata
- Class: Aves
- Order: Passeriformes
- Family: Sturnidae
- Genus: Rhabdornis
- Species: R. rabori

Binomial name
- Rhabdornis rabori Rand, 1950

= Visayan rhabdornis =

Species of bird

The Visayan rhabdornis (Rhabdornis rabori) is a species of bird currently placed in the starling family, Sturnidae. It is endemic to the central Philippines on the islands of Negros and Panay of the Visayan archipelago. It was previously considered a subspecies of the stripe-breasted rhabdornis. It lives in tropical moist montane forest and is threatened by habitat loss.

== Description ==
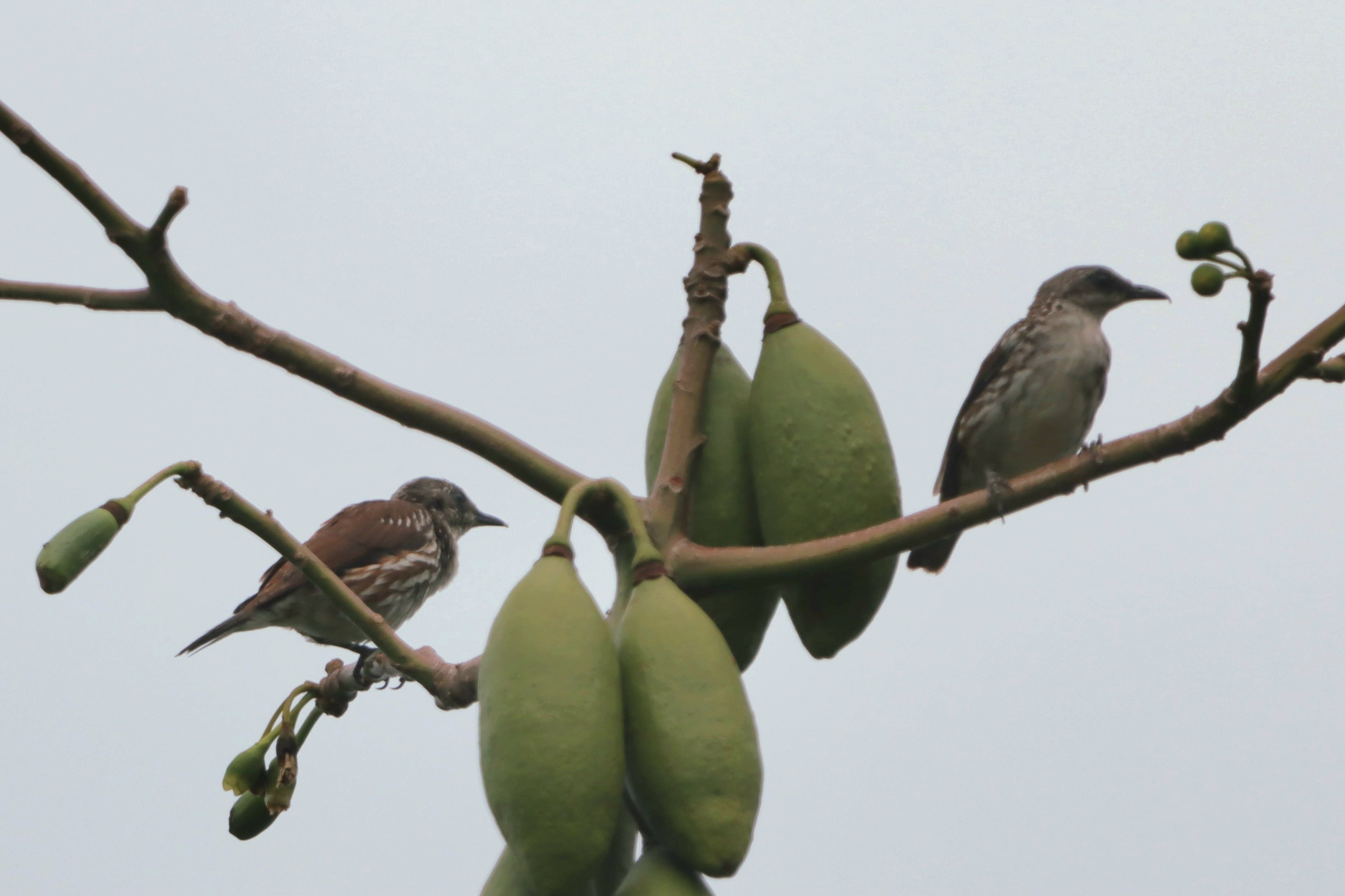
Two Visayan rhabdornis on Negros

Was formerly conspecific with the stripe-breasted rhabdornis and grand rhabdornis but is differentiated by pale brownish gray mask, paler gray crown and plainer head, brown-gray throat and black spotting on neck and a longer tail.

This species is monotypic.

== Ecology and behavior ==
The Visayan rhabdornis is a generalist in its diet as it feeds on various food sources such as insects, berries and nectar. It typically forages in the canopy and perches on dead trees.

Not much is known about its breeding habits. Season is presumed to be March to June which is around the time most other forest birds breed. Nest is made from sticks placed in a tree cavity.

== Habitat and conservation status ==
The Visayan rhabdornis lives in sub-montane and montane primary and secondary forest, forest edge and occasionally in clearings with an altitude range of 800 to 1,700 meters above sea level. It is often seen on the upper levels of the forest strata in the canopy.

IUCN Red List has assessed the Visayan rhabdornis as Least Concern, with an estimated population of 2,500 to 9,999 mature individuals. This species was previously listed as a vulnerable species due to its rarity but the assessors justified its downlisting by stating that this species was likely overlooked and its submontane habitat is less under threat than the remaining lowland forest. However, a researcher spent 51 days in Northwest Panay Peninsula Natural Park and only encountered this bird 6 times despite actively looking for this bird, highlighting its rarity.

Despite this, this bird's main threat is extensive habitat loss on Negros and Panay. Primary forests have been almost totally destroyed on Negros (where just 4% of any type of forest cover remained in 1988) and Panay (where 8% remained). Habitat degradation, through clearance for agriculture, timber and charcoal burning, continues to seriously threaten remaining fragments.

Conservation actions proposed include surveys to determine the species' status in Negros and Panay and increased forest protection.
