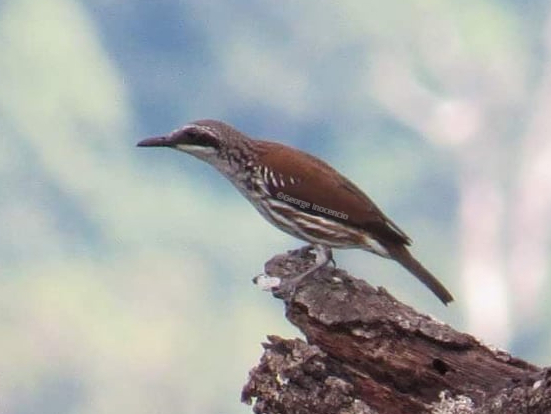

Conservation status
- Least Concern (IUCN 3.1)

Scientific classification
- Kingdom: Animalia
- Phylum: Chordata
- Class: Aves
- Order: Passeriformes
- Family: Sturnidae
- Genus: Rhabdornis
- Species: R. grandis

Binomial name
- Rhabdornis grandis Salomonsen, 1953

= Grand rhabdornis =

Species of bird

The grand rhabdornis (Rhabdornis grandis), also known as the long-billed rhabdornis or long-billed creeper, is a species of bird currently placed in the starling family, Sturnidae. It is endemic to Luzon Island in the Philippines. It was formerly conspecific with the Visayan rhabdornis and the Stripe-breasted rhabdornis

== Description ==
A medium-sized, long-billed bird of foothill and montane forest in northern Luzon with a white throat and belly, a brown back, rufous wings and tail, a black mask with a thin white eyebrow above, a gray crown, and brown sides broadly streaked white. Similar to Stripe-sided Rhabdornis, which overlaps in its range and is occasionally seen with, but usually found at higher elevations, and crown is gray rather than streaked white. Voice includes a high-pitched "tsip!"

Was formerly conspecific with the Stripe-breasted rhabdornis and Visayan rhabdornis but is differentiated by its longer bill, darker mask, gray crown, white underparts and darker brown wings.

This species is monotypic.

== Ecology and behavior ==
It is a generalist with its diet as it feeds on various food sources such as insects, berries and nectar. It typically forages in the canopy and perches on dead trees.

Males and females found to be in breeding condition with brood patches and enlarged gonads in May. Nest is described as typically 10 to 15 meters high on dead trees with bark strips used as nest material. Not much else information is known about its mating, breeding and nesting habits.

== Habitat and conservation status ==
Its natural habitat is tropical mid-elevation and high elevation montane forest. The International Union for Conservation of Nature lists it as a Least-concern species but despite this the population is still said to be declining due to habitat loss and fragmentation from illegal logging, land conversion, slash-and-burn farming and mining. It is also generally uncommon throughout its range. It is believed to be somewhat tolerant of habitat loss but more studies are required on its ecology to be able to properly assess its actual conservation status.

It is found in the Northern Sierra Madre Natural Park actual protection from habitat loss and deforestation is lax.
