= OECD Guidelines for Multinational Enterprises on Responsible Business Conduct =

Agreements on conduct by large companies in high-power countries

The OECD Guidelines for Multinational Enterprises on Responsible Business Conduct are recommendations on responsible business conduct addressed by governments to multinational enterprises operating in or from the 52 adhering countries. The Guidelines provide non-binding principles and standards for responsible business conduct in a global context that are consistent with applicable laws and internationally recognised standards. The Guidelines are an annex of the Declaration on International Investment and Multinational Enterprises.

The Guidelines are legally non-binding, but the OECD Investment Committee and its Working Party on Responsible Business Conduct encourage implementation among adherents. The most concrete manifestation of government commitment to the principles set forth in the Guidelines are the National Contact Points (NCPs), which are offices charged with promoting observance of the Guidelines by multinational enterprises. Each of the 52 adhering countries are required to set up an NCP.

Among other tasks, NCPs are charged with supporting a grievance mechanism called 'specific instances' — under this procedure, alleged non-observance of one or more of the Guidelines' recommendations is brought to the attention of an NCP, which then is responsible for helping the parties to find a resolution for the issues raised by providing access to consensual and non-adversarial procedures.

Since the mediation procedure for NCPs was established in 2000, 450 specific instances have been handled covering such areas as employment and industrial relations (about half of the specific instances), environment, human rights and disclosure of information (the database on specific instances covers the 2000-2019 period).

Originally, the Declaration and the Guidelines were adopted by the NP in 1976. The Guidelines were subsequently revised in 1979, 1982, 1984, 1991, 2000, 2011, and most recently in 2023.

== Issues covered ==
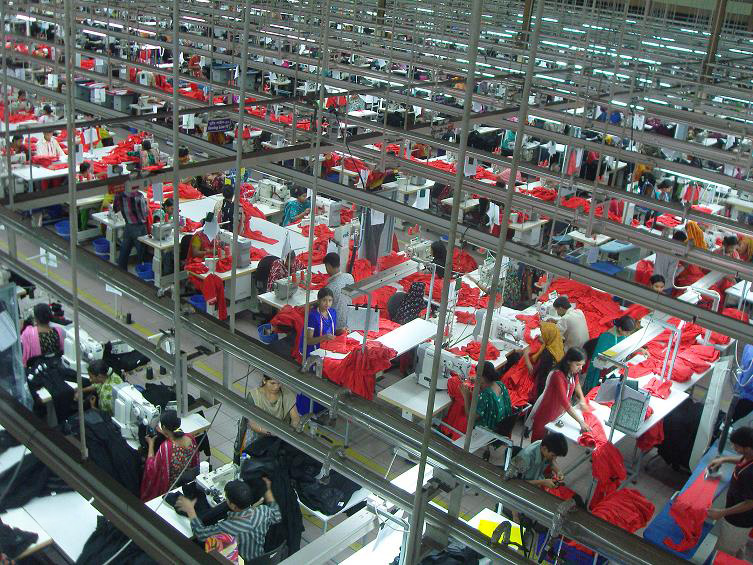
Garment factory in Bangladesh

The Guidelines cover business ethics on a range of issues, including:

- employment and industrial relations
- human rights
- environment
- information disclosure
- combating bribery
- consumer interests
- science and technology
- competition
- taxation.

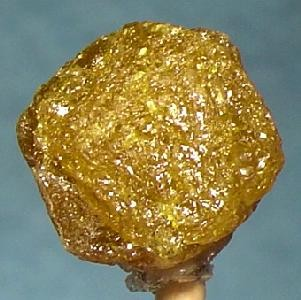
Uncut diamond from the Democratic Republic of Congo

In addition, the OECD has developed more detailed guidance in a number of sectors to help enterprises implement the Guidelines and proactively identify risks of adverse impacts. These sectors include extractives, mineral supply chains, agricultural supply chains, garment supply chains, and the financial sector. The work of the National Contact Points in support of this development is called the "proactive agenda."

== Supporting institutions ==
=== National Contact Points ===
According to the OECD Council decision each adhering country has to set up a National Contact Point (NCP), an entity responsible for the promotion of the Guidelines on a national level. It handles all enquiries and matters related to the Guidelines in that country, including investigating complaints (referred to as "specific instances") about a company operating in, or headquartered in that country. Some NCPS are based in a relevant government department; others are independent structures comprising government officials, trade unions, employers unions and sometimes non-governmental organisations.

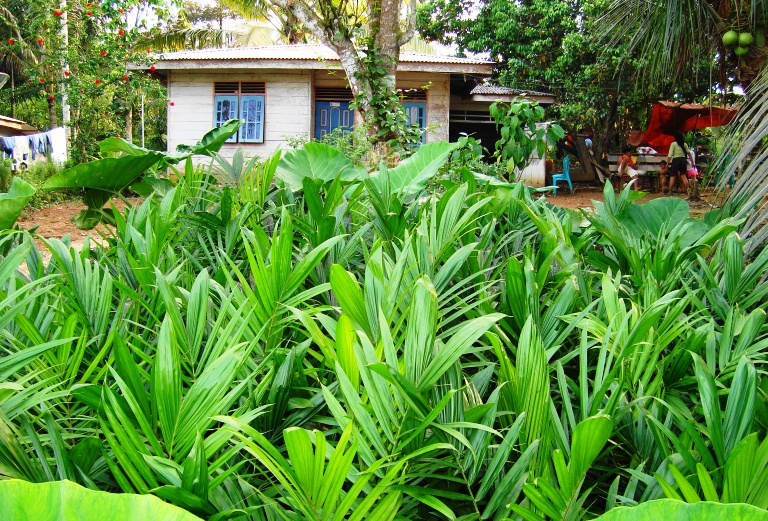
Oil palm nursery in Indonesia

The functioning of the NCPs is reviewed every year and the findings are summarised in an annual report. In order to improve their functioning and coherence across adherent countries, the NCPs established a peer review schedule in 2016 that plans 4-6 reviews annually. These peer reviews provide an in-depth focus on the functioning of individual NCPs.

=== OECD Investment Committee ===
The OECD Investment Committee is the primary body responsible for overseeing the functioning of the Guidelines and implementation of all OECD investment instruments. The Committee consists of member states' senior officials from treasuries, economics, trade and industry, and foreign affairs ministries and central banks. All OECD member states are members of the Investment Committee. Argentina and Brazil are observers and the 14 non-Members that have subscribed to the Declaration participate in the work of the committee on issues related to the Guidelines. A Working Party on Responsible Business Conduct was established in 2013 as a subsidiary body of the Investment Committee to help implement the Guidelines and strengthen the system of National Contact Points.

== Adhering countries ==
- Argentina
- Australia
- Austria
- Belgium
- Brazil
- Bulgaria
- Canada
- Chile
- Colombia
- Costa Rica
- Croatia
- Czech Republic
- Denmark
- Egypt
- Estonia
- Finland
- France
- Germany
- Greece
- Hungary
- Iceland
- Ireland
- Israel
- Italy
- Japan
- Jordan
- Kazakhstan
- Latvia
- Lithuania
- Luxembourg
- Mauritius
- Mexico
- Morocco
- Netherlands
- New Zealand
- Norway
- Peru
- Poland
- Portugal
- Romania
- Slovakia
- Slovenia
- South Korea
- Spain
- Sweden
- Switzerland
- Turkey
- Tunisia
- Ukraine
- United Kingdom
- United States
- Uruguay

== See also ==
- Multilateral Agreement on Investment
- OECD Anti-Bribery Convention
- Business at OECD, or The Business and Industry Advisory Committee to the OECD (BIAC)
- Trade Union Advisory Committee to the OECD
