= The Creeping (novel) =

2015 novel

- First edition cover
- Author: Alexandra Sirowy
- Language: English
- Genre: Thriller, mystery
- Published: 2015
- Publisher: Simon & Schuster Books for Young Readers
- Publication place: United States
- Media type: Print, e-book
- Pages: 400 pages
- ISBN: 1481418866
- Followed by: The Telling

The Creeping is a 2015 young adult suspense thriller and the debut novel of Alexandra Sirowy. It was released on August 18, 2015, through Simon & Schuster Books for Young Readers in hardback and e-book formats.

== Synopsis ==
Twelve years ago two young girls, Jeanie and Stella, went out to pick strawberries near Jeanie's home in the small town of Savage. The two girls go missing and only one of them, Stella, returns - but without any memory of the prior events, with her hair put up in a French braid, and repeatedly stating the sentence "If you hunt for monsters, you'll find them". Whatever happened to her and Jeanie was so traumatic that the memory was wiped from her mind, along with many of her other childhood memories. This puts her at odds with some of the townspeople, especially Jeanie's brother Daniel, who believes that Stella has been lying about losing her memory. Now seventeen, all Stella wants to do is move past this painful past and enjoy her summer with her friends and her crush, Taylor. Despite disliking people dwelling on the past, Stella still agrees to go to the annual "Day of Bones", a summer party held by the town's teenagers on the day of Jeanie's disappearance. During the party Stella recovers a brief memory of Jeanie prior to the teenagers discovering the body of a young girl that looks similar to Jeanie. This puts Stella on edge, especially after Jeanie's mother is found murdered only hours later. The police believe that Jeanie's father, Kent Talcott not only murdered his wife but was also responsible for the deaths of Jeanie and the unidentified victim, but Stella is convinced that he is innocent.

Stella decides to investigate the death and gain some insight over her past. She also reconnects with her former friend Sam, who she'd pushed away due to his lack of popularity. During their investigation the two of them fall in love with one another, which temporarily causes her friend Zoey to become jealous - especially after she learns that Stella was withholding information about the case. Stella and Sam are aided by Daniel, who takes them to meet Griever, an elderly woman who claims that there have been several children stolen from the town since the town's creation, all by a monster she calls the Creeper. This confuses Stella, especially after Shane, one of the detectives that handled Jeanie's disappearance, tells her that there have been no other disappearances in the town in the last sixty years other than Jeanie's. During this an unseen watcher begins to menace Stella.

The group eventually finds that Janie had been afraid of monsters shortly before she disappeared and that Stella and her friends (Zoey, Zoey's brother Caleb, Daniel, and Sam) had been hunting monsters that summer as a result. Stella also begins recalling more of her lost memories and also discovers that someone has been committing animal sacrifices, something that someone in the town has been doing since its inception. When Kent Talcott is arrested over the murders Stella is stunned, especially as Daniel has testified against his father. Stella decides to confront Shane over the Creeper, but he assures her that the only evil out there is human evil.

The book culminates with Stella venturing out into the woods to help Caleb find his sister Zoey, who he claims has run off after getting drunk at a party. While searching Stella regains a memory of gnarled hands, after which Daniel appears and the two boys attack her and drag her further into the forest. The two confess that they had accidentally murdered Jeanie years ago (and that Daniel had murdered his mother) and that they had been targeting Stella, knowing that she would eventually remember. Daniel had shot at Stella hoping to scare her, only for him to end up accidentally shooting Jeanie. Shocked, the two boys told Stella to remain with Jeanie while they went for help, only for Stella to wander off and get lost, during which time Jeanie's body went missing. This confession restores several of Stella's memories, including ones where she recalled Daniel mentally torturing his sister under the guise of "teaching her a lesson". Caleb and Daniel challenge Stella: Zoey is currently in a lake in the forest and if she can reach Zoey before she dies, they'll save her life - but will still murder Stella.

Stella manages to save Zoey, but must dive underwater to do so. When she resurfaces Caleb and Daniel are gone and Sam is there with Shane, as Stella had messaged him earlier to tell him she was going into the forest. She is taken to the hospital, during which time Caleb is discovered. He admits to the murders but also claims that they had been chased by a monster that killed Daniel. While Shane assures her that there is no monster, Stella still wonders if there is actually a Creeper out there and requests to look at the case files for the other girls that went missing in the town. Shane reluctantly agrees.

She and Sam spend time looking through the files, only for her to realize that many of the disappearances were likely due to non-supernatural causes. Stella eventually decides that although there is evidence to suggest that the Creeper exists, trying to prove its existence would become an obsession that would consume her life. With this in mind, she chooses to finally move on from the past and embrace a healthier future with Sam and Zoey.

== Reception ==
Critical reception for The Creeping has been mostly positive. The book has received praise from Publishers Weekly, Booklist, and the School Library Journal, the last of which wrote "A solid choice for horror fans, this novel will is a spook-tastic spine-tingler." Kirkus Reviews wrote "Although the story takes rather too long to tell, it delivers with a nicely suspenseful plot that builds to a crisis point. Intriguing all the way through." The Bulletin of the Center for Children's Books was slightly mixed in their review, negatively comparing it to Robin Wasserman's The Waking Dark while also stating that it would still likely please horror fans.
