= Creepers (video game) =

1993 video game

- Developer: Destiny Software Productions
- Publisher: Psygnosis
- Series: MS-DOS
- Release: 1993

Creepers is a video game developed by Canadian studio Destiny Software Productions for MS-DOS and published by Psygnosis in 1993.

== Reception ==
Scott A. May for Compute! said "Creepers plays well, but it lacks the zest and individuality needed to stand out in this popular genre."

David S. Moskowitz for VideoGames & Computer Entertainment said "Creepers is just as enjoyable and addictive as one would expect from Psygnosis [...] computer-puzzle fans have very little to complain about."

Ken Hill for Computer Gaming World said "All in all, Creepers is a disappointment. Something about the whole premise just doesn't work; the ideas here just aren't as fresh as they were in the original Lemmings."
