= Creepshow (soundtrack) =

Soundtrack album by John Harrison
- Released: 1982
- Genre: Film score
- Length: 40:58
- Label: Varèse Sarabande
- Producer: John Sutton

Creepshow (Original Motion Picture Soundtrack) is the soundtrack album to the 1982 horror film Creepshow, composed and conducted by John Harrison. The soundtrack album was released by Varèse Sarabande Records as an LP record in the United States in 1982.

== Original 1982 release ==
=== Track listing ===
First release on LP by Varèse Sarabande Records. For the original soundtrack, the time length for the score was only 40 minutes and 58 seconds.

Side one
No.	Title	Length
1.	"Prologue"	1:51
2.	"Welcome to Creepshow (Main Title)"	2:16
3.	"Father's Day"	7:31
4.	"The Lonesome Death of Jordy Verrill"	2:36
5.	"Something to Tide You Over"	5:26

Side two
No.	Title	Length
1.	"The Crate"	5:29
2.	"They're Creeping Up on You"	7:35
3.	"Epilogue"	3:44
4.	"Until the Next Time (End Title)"	4:30
Total length:		40:58

== Subsequent releases ==
=== Release history ===
Title	U.S. release date	Label	Format
Creepshow (Original Motion Picture Soundtrack)	1982	Varèse Sarabande Records	LP
Creepshow (Original Motion Picture Soundtrack)	2003	La-La Land Records	CD
Creepshow (Original Motion Picture Soundtrack)	2014	La-La Land Records	Digital
Creepshow (Expanded Original Motion Picture Soundtrack)	2014	La-La Land Records	CD, Digital

=== 2003 CD release ===
Creepshow (Original Motion Picture Soundtrack)

Film score by John Harrison
- Released: 2003
- Recorded: 1982
- Genre: Film score
- Length: 1:06:43
- Label: La-La Land Records
- Producer: John Sutton

First release on CD by La-La Land Records in 2003. It is identical in content to the LP release, except for the addition of music from Tales from the Darkside, Mansions of the Moon and Shoobie Doobie Moon.

No.	Title	Length
1.	"Prologue/Welcome to Creepshow (Main Title)"	4:07
2.	"Father's Day"	7:31
3.	"The Lonesome Death of Jordy Verrill"	2:36
4.	"Something to Tide You Over"	5:26
5.	"The Crate"	5:29
6.	"They're Creeping Up on You"	7:35
7.	"Epilogue"	3:44
8.	"Until the Next Time (End Title)"	4:30
9.	"Satanic Piano (From "Tales from the Darkside")"	4:29
10.	"Everybody Needs a Little Love (From "Tales from the Darkside")"	3:10
11.	"Sorry, Right Number (From "Tales from the Darkside")"	5:31
12.	"Overture (From "Mansions of the Moon")"	6:08
13.	"Main Title Song (From "Shoobie Doobie Moon")"	4:12
14.	"You Make Me Feel Like a Monster (From "Shoobie Doobie Moon")"	2:15
Total length:		1:06:43

=== 2014 Expanded Edition ===
Creepshow (Expanded Original Motion Picture Soundtrack)

Film score by John Harrison
- Released: 2014
- Recorded: 1982
- Genre: Film score
- Length: 1:15:09
- Label: La-La Land Records
- Producer: John Sutton

The 2014 release includes the complete film score, including expanded and unreleased tracks.

No.	Title	Artist(s)	Length
1.	"Prologue (Prologue and Opening Titles)"	John Harrison	1:37
2.	"The Creepshow Welcomes You (Prologue and Opening Titles)"	John Harrison	2:26
3.	"Henry Is Told the Family Secrets (Father's Day)"	John Harrison	1:25
4.	"She Bashed His Head in (Father's Day)"	John Harrison	0:53
5.	"Bedelia Arrives (Father's Day)"	John Harrison	0:47
6.	"Where's My Cake? I Want My Cake! (Father's Day)"	John Harrison	1:38
7.	"Nate Comes Out of the Grave (Father's Day)"	John Harrison	1:16
8.	"Henry Goes Looking (Father's Day)"	John Harrison	1:03
9.	"Henry Meets Nate and Gets Crushed (Father's Day)"	John Harrison	0:54
10.	"I Got My Cake (Father's Day)"	John Harrison	0:52
11.	"Sylvia on a Platter/A Meteor Arrives (Father's Day)"	John Harrison	1:01
12.	"Jordy Discovers His Meteor (The Lonesome Death of Jordy Verrill)"	John Harrison	1:00
13.	"Jordy Hallucinates and Takes a Bath (The Lonesome Death of Jordy Verrill)"	John Harrison	1:37
14.	"From the Farm to the Beach (Something to Tide You Over)"	John Harrison	0:29
15.	"Get in That Hole, Harry (Something to Tide You Over)"	John Harrison	1:45
16.	"If You Can Hold Your Breath (Something to Tide You Over)"	John Harrison	2:10
17.	"Richard Watches Them Drown (Something to Tide You Over)"	John Harrison	1:38
18.	"From the Beach to the College (The Crate)"	John Harrison	0:32
19.	"Mike Discovers the Crate (The Crate)"	John Harrison	0:32
20.	"Dex and Mike Move the Crate (The Crate)"	John Harrison	1:41
21.	"Dex and Mike Open the Crate (The Crate)"	John Harrison	1:50
22.	"Mike Meets Fluffy (The Crate)"	John Harrison	1:20
23.	"Henry Leaves Wilma a Note (The Crate)"	John Harrison	4:10
24.	"Wilma Goes Under the Stairs (The Crate)"	John Harrison	1:00
25.	"Wake Up! Wake Up! (The Crate)"	John Harrison	0:50
26.	"Fluffy Eats Wilma (The Crate)"	John Harrison	0:44
27.	"Henry Dumps Fluffy (The Crate)"	John Harrison	0:48
28.	"What Are Friends For (The Crate)"	John Harrison	0:32
29.	"Bastards (They're Creeping Up on You)"	John Harrison	1:21
30.	"Bugs Start Creeping Up on Pratt (They're Creeping Up on You)"	John Harrison	0:35
31.	"Blackout (They're Creeping Up on You)"	John Harrison	1:22
32.	"The End of Pratt (They're Creeping Up on You)"	John Harrison	0:35
33.	"Garbage Men Find Billy's Comic Book (Epilogue)"	John Harrison	0:57
34.	"Until Next Time (Epilogue)"	John Harrison	3:42
35.	"Don't Let Go (Music Library Cue) (Father's Day)"	Frank McDonald & Chris Rae	3:39
36.	"Graduation Day (Music Library Cue) (The Lonesome Death of Jordy Verrill)"	Gaudeamus Igitur	1:26
37.	"Spy Fingers (Music Library Cue) (The Lonesome Death of Jordy Verrill)"	Ib Glindemann	1:57
38.	"Danger Tension (Music Library Cue) (The Lonesome Death of Jordy Verrill)"	Ib Glindemann	1:52
39.	"Freedom Flight (Music Library Cue) (The Lonesome Death of Jordy Verrill)"	Jan Kennedy	3:59
40.	"Haunted Castle (Music Library Cue) (Something to Tide You Over)"	Ib Glindemann	1:37
41.	"Dramatic Eerie (Music Library Cue) (Something to Tide You Over)"	Philip Green	1:32
42.	"Space Suspense (Music Library Cue) (Something to Tide You Over)"	Erik Markman	0:59
43.	"Danger in Space (Music Library Cue) (Something to Tide You Over)"	Ib Glindemann	1:23
44.	"Mystery Hour (Music Library Cue) (The Crate)"	Ib Glindemann	2:18
45.	"Eternal Light (Music Library Cue) (The Crate)"	Roger Webb	2:09
46.	"Vaudeville (Music Library Cue) (They're Creeping Up on You)"	Neil Amsterdam	2:57
47.	"Big Band Era #4 (Music Library Cue) (They're Creeping Up on You)"	Neil Amsterdam	2:18
48.	"Dixieland (Music Library Cue) (They're Creeping Up on You)"	Dan Kirsten	2:01
Total length:			1:15:09
