= Job creep =

Adversarial employment phenomenon

Job creep is a phenomenon in which employers continually require increasing amounts of work relative to the normal requirements of their operations.
