= Creeping Jesus =

Expression in the English language

Creeping Jesus is a derogatory term to describe someone seeking to make a public display of religiosity or piety in a manner which seems hypocritical and simply for show.

== Origins of term ==
The origins of the term remain unclear. One possible meaning is of someone who creeps around a packed church to pray at each of the Stations of the Cross hanging on the walls with the intention that everyone in the pews can see them doing so, as if to say "notice how religious I am".

It is used in a rather different sense in William Blake's poem The Everlasting Gospel:

If he had been Antichrist, Creeping Jesus,
He'd have done anything to please us:
Gone sneaking into synagogues
And not us’d the Elders and Priests like dogs
But humble as a lamb or ass
Obey’d Himself to Caiaphas.

== Changing meanings ==
By the end of the 20th century, the term had evolved somewhat away from a purely religion-focused term to one levelled at any public display presumed to be hypocritical.

== Examples of usage ==
The term is used as a character nickname in the novel Morvern Callar by Alan Warner. The term likewise shows up in the novel After the fire, a still small voice by Evie Wyld. The usage in this latter instance has to deal not with the traditional meaning of the term, but as a bogeyman manifestation of the protagonist's haunting trauma. Also used in The Street by Gerry Adams in the selection "Civil War," where Catherine calls Willie out on creeping-Jesus. Also used as a character in Stephen King's novel, It.
