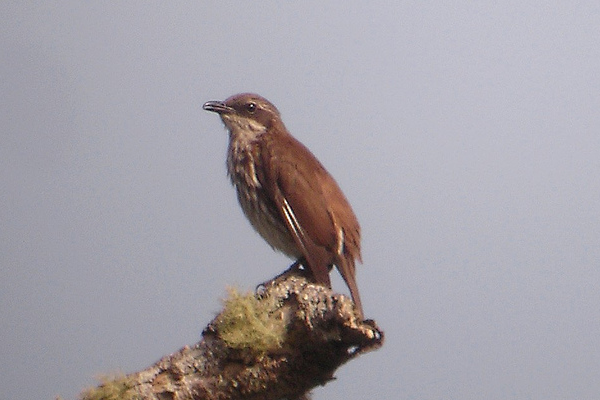

Conservation status
- Least Concern (IUCN 3.1)

Scientific classification
- Kingdom: Animalia
- Phylum: Chordata
- Class: Aves
- Order: Passeriformes
- Family: Sturnidae
- Genus: Rhabdornis
- Species: R. inornatus

Binomial name
- Rhabdornis inornatus Ogilvie-Grant, 1896

= Stripe-breasted rhabdornis =

Species of bird

The stripe-breasted rhabdornis (Rhabdornis inornatus), also known as the stripe-breasted creeper or plain-headed creeper, is a species of bird currently placed in the starling family, Sturnidae. It is endemic to the Philippines on the islands of Mindanao, Leyte, Samar and Biliran. It is typically found in tropical montane and submontane forest but has been found as low as 230 masl in Leyte. It is part of a species complex that includes the Visayan rhabdornis and the Grand rhabdornis which were formerly subspecies of this bird.

== Description and taxonomy ==
=== Subspecies ===
Three subspecies are recognized:

- R. i. inornatus – Found on Samar
- R. i. leytensis – Found on Leyte and Biliran
- R. i. alaris – Found on Mindanao

The Visayan rhabdornis (R. rabori) is now usually considered a distinct species, where previously it was considered a subspecies. The grand rhabdornis (R. grandis) of Luzon Island is sometimes regarded as a subspecies, but usually now considered a distinct species as well.

== Ecology and behavior ==
It is a generalist with its diet as it feeds on various food sources such as insects, berries, nectar and even small amphibians. It typically forages in the canopy and perches on dead trees. Typically forages in groups of up to 10 individuals but a large flock of 100 birds has been spotted during an termite larvae emergence.

Not much is known about its breeding habits but juveniles have been reported from Feb to June. Nests in tree cavities.

== Habitat and conservation status ==
It is found in tropical montane and submontane forest typically 800 to 1,750 meters above sea level but has been found as low as 230 masl in Leyte.

The IUCN has classified the species as being of Least Concern but is declining in population. It is said to be uncommon throughout its range. It is affected by habitat loss through deforestation, mining, land conversion and slash-and-burn - just not to the same extent as lowland forest.

It is found in multiple protected areas such as Mount Apo and Kitanglad Mountain Range but like all areas in the Philippines protection is lax.
