= Creeps (novel) =

2013 novel by Darren Hynes

- First edition
- Author: Darren Hynes
- Published: 2013, Razorbill
- Media type: Print, ebook
- Pages: 256 pages
- ISBN: 978-0143187141

Creeps is a 2013 young adult novel that was written by Darren Hynes. It was first published in Canada on July 30, 2013 through RazorBill.

== Synopsis ==
Wayne is a teenager growing up in a dysfunctional home. His father is an alcoholic and his mother keeps threatening to desert him all. He can't escape his home life in school either, as Wayne is constantly bullied by his schoolmate Pete "The Meat". One morning he's rescued by Marjorie, a teen girl dealing with her own problematic home life, and the two begin to befriend one another. However even as the two seek solace in one another, Pete has decided to take matters into his own hands and find a way to torment not only Wayne but Marjorie as well.

== Reception ==
Quill and Quire panned Creeps overall, criticizing Hynes for "[rehashing] familiar caricatures" and that "aside from Wayne's fear of daily menace and a subplot involving a play that almost doesn't go on, there's not a lot to the story." CM Magazine also heavily criticized Creeps, stating that "the writing style is not terribly problematic in itself—though the first-person unsent letters are a bit jarring and don't always flow with the rest of the narration—however the failure of Hynes to move beyond stereotypes and flat adult characters—with the possible exception of Mr. Rollie, the drama teacher, and Mr. Ricketts, the janitor—keeps the story from moving beyond a limited exploration of a very haunted group of young people. "
