= Rollback (legislation) =

Political-economic metaphor

In government and economic contexts, Rollback metaphorically denotes action to repeal, dismantle or otherwise diminish the effect of a law or regulation.

== Trade legislation ==
The term was utilised by the MAI Negotiating Group in the 1990s in the context of seeking to enforce legislative progress toward "free trade". Rollback of trade-protective measures was to be made compulsory under the agreement.

Rollback is the liberalisation process by which the reduction and eventual elimination of nonconforming measures to the MAI would take place. It is a dynamic element linked with standstill, which provides its starting point. Combined with standstill, it would produce a “ratchet effect”, where any new liberalisation measures would be “locked in” so they could not be rescinded or nullified over time.

== See also ==
- Ratchet effect
- Austerity Measures
