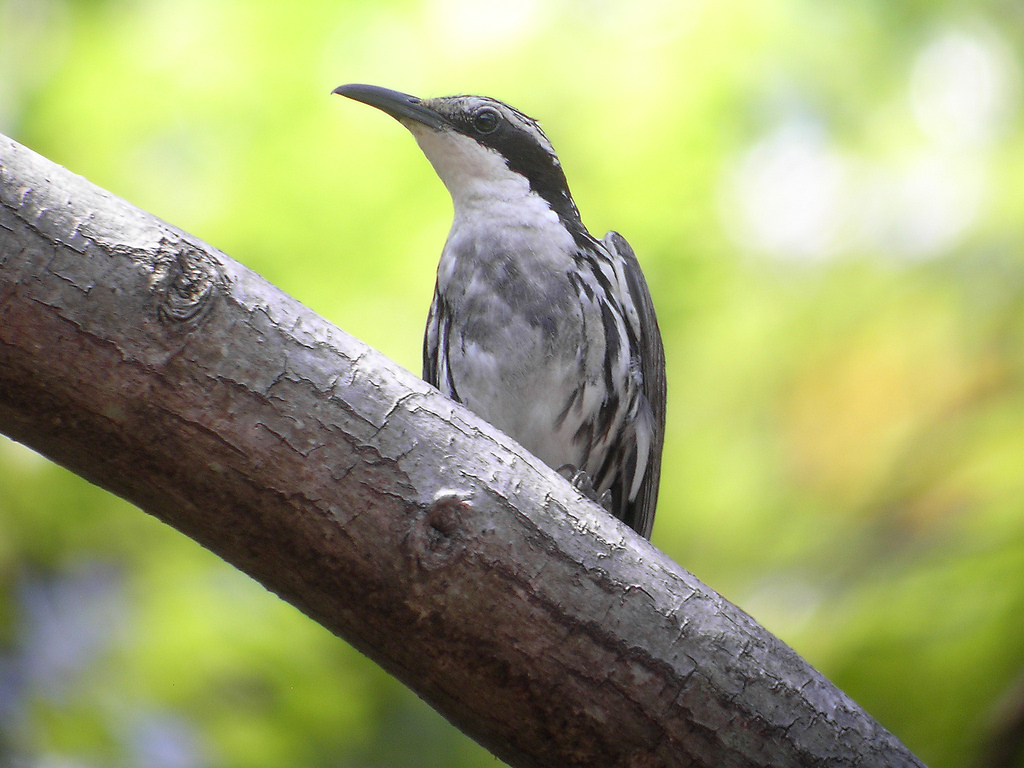
- Stripe-headed rhabdornis (Rhabdornis mystacalis)

Scientific classification
- Kingdom: Animalia
- Phylum: Chordata
- Class: Aves
- Order: Passeriformes
- Superfamily: Muscicapoidea
- Family: Sturnidae
- Genus: Rhabdornis; Reichenbach, 1853

Type species
- Meliphaga mysticalis Temminck, 1825

Species
- Rhabdornis grandis Rhabdornis inornatus Rhabdornis mystacalis Rhabdornis rabori

= Philippine creeper =

Philippine creepers

Genus of birds

The Philippine creepers or rhabdornises are small passerine birds and form the genus Rhabdornis. They are endemic to the Philippines. They do not migrate, other than to make local movements.

== Taxonomy ==
The genus Rhabdornis was introduced in 1853 by German naturalist Ludwig Reichenbach to accommodate the stripe-headed rhabdornis. The name combines the Ancient Greek rhabdos meaning "stripe" with ornis meaning "bird."

The relationship of the Philippine creepers to other bird species was formerly uncertain and the genus Rhabdornis was placed in its own family Rhabdornithinae. Molecular phylogenetic studies have revealed that the Philippine creepers are aberrant members of the starling family Sturnidae.

The genus contains the following four species:

Image	Common name	Scientific name
	Stripe-headed rhabdornis, stripe-headed rhabdornis or stripe-sided rhabdornis	Rhabdornis mystacalis
	Grand rhabdornis, long-billed rhabdornis or grand rhabdornis	Rhabdornis grandis
	Stripe-breasted rhabdornis, plain-headed creeper or stripe-breasted rhabdornis	Rhabdornis inornatus
	Visayan rhabdornis	Rhabdornis rabori

== Description ==
The Philippine creepers are similar in appearance to treecreepers (Certhiidae). They have thin pointed down-curved bills, which they can use to extricate insects from bark, but they have brush-like tongues, which enable them to also feed on nectar.
