= Claudio Tennie =

German interdisciplinary researcher

- Born: 1976 (age 49–50); Germany
- Education: 2004 - 2009 - University of Göttingen (PhD) 1999 - 2003 - University of Bielefeld (diploma) 1998 - 1999 - University of Edinburgh, UK 1996 - 1998 - Philipps Universität Marburg (pre-diploma)
- Occupations: Scientist, Research group leader
- Years active: 2004-present
- Employer(s): 2017-present - University of Tübingen, Department of Early Prehistory and Quaternary Ecology 2012 - 2017 - University of Birmingham, Faculty of Psychology, UK 2004 - 2012 - Max Plank for Evolutionary Anthropology, Leipzig
- Title: Prof. Dr.
- Awards: 2025 - DFG Cluster of Excellence ("HUMAN ORIGINS") 2017 - ERC Starting Grant ("STONECULT" project) 2015 - NERC Innovation Project Grant 2013 - ESRC Future Research Leader Grant

Claudio Tennie (born 1976) is a German professor (APL) at the University of Tuebingen. He is an evolutionary anthropologist, cognitive archaeologist and primatologist, whose research focuses on the evolution of culture, social learning, and cumulative culture in humans and non-human primates. In 2009 Tennie and colleagues proposed the Zone of Latent Solution (ZLS) theory, which outlines the main conditions for the evolution of human cumulative culture and seeks to explain differences observed between contemporary human and most animal cultures. In April 2024, Tennie successfully defended a rare triple habilitation in prehistory, psychology, and behavioral biology at the University of Tübingen. As the main focus of Tennie's research is the evolution of special types of culture within the human lineage, his experimental and theoretical studies intersect multiple research fields, including biology, psychology, archaeology and philosophy, with special emphasis on behavioural biology, comparative and developmental psychology, cognitive archaeology of early stone tools, and philosophy of science.

== Education and career ==
Tennie studied biology at the University of Marburg (1996–1998), where he obtained his intermediate diplom. He also attended biology, ethology and philosophy classes at the University of Edinburgh (1998–1999), and then completed his diplom thesis in behavioral biology and psychology at the University of Bielefeld (1999–2003). His diplom thesis topic was on the difference between imitation and emulation (types of social learning) in non-human great apes, which he tested at the Wolfgang Köhler Primate Research Centre in Leipzig. During his PhD, Tennie stayed at this centre, where he was supervised by Michael Tomasello and Josep Call. Tennie defended his PhD thesis ("Human culture versus great ape traditions: Mechanisms of observational learning in human children and great apes") on 20.11.2009. In the same year he and his two PhD supervisors published the initial version of the ZLS theory which added animal behavioural principles to the cumulative culture theories by Tomasello. In April 2024 Tennie successfully defended a rare triple habilitation in prehistory and early history, psychology, behavioural biology and comparative biocognition, at the University of Tuebingen.

After his first postdoctoral position (2009–2012) at the MPI for Evolutionary Anthropology, Leipzig, Tennie became a Birmingham Fellow and eventually a tenured faculty member with his Comparative Cognition Research Group at the University of Birmingham, UK (2012–2017). In 2013 Tennie was appointed Adjunct Scientist at Lester E. Fisher Center for the Study and Conservation of Apes, Lincoln Park Zoo, Chicago, USA. In the same year he was granted an ESRC Future Research Leader Grant. In 2017 he received a new permanent position as a group leader ("Tools and Culture among Early Hominins") at the University of Tuebingen, where he resides to this day. Tennie was awarded an ERC Starting Grant in 2016 for his "STONECULT" project, which started in 2017 testing early stone tools for the first evidence of special types of cultural evolution in the archaeological record. Starting in 2026, he serves as lead investigator for the "Human Origins" Cluster of Excellence (funded by the German Research Foundation DFG).

== Zone of Latent Solutions ==
First published in 2009, Zone of Latent Solutions (ZLS) is defined as a zone of behaviors (solutions) that can be principally achieved in suitable circumstances by motivated, typically developed individuals of a given species without the need to copy the underlying "know-how"). The exact ways in which these solutions are achieved biologically (e.g. trial and error learning or associations) are irrelevant to the ZLS account, because ZLS theory focuses on know how copying. Thus, as long as its know how, or related know how, need not be copied from others for the target behavior to come about (where it can come about with a non-zero likelihood, which can be low or high), a behavior is considered latent. Tennie and colleagues stated in 2009 that contemporary apes have cultures, but that these types of cultures are sustained by social learning types other than know-how copying. As such, and following evolutionary logic, his prediction was that ape behavioral ranges should largely or completely be restricted to latent solutions, and with it, to their zones of latent solutions. These zones can grow and change, but doing so appears to require slow evolution of behavior mainly via biological routes. Supporting the ZLS theory of apes, Tennie and his group have repeatedly shown that motivated, but naive to the target know-how, captive apes can invent tool use behavior. Similarly, Tennie and colleagues showed that even when motivated, these apes did not copy know how beyond their individual ZLS reach under controlled test conditions.

According to ZLS theory humans have some basic latent solutions, too, but in contrast to apes, humans can copy know-how beyond their realistic individual reach. Tennie suggested that human-enculturated and human-trained apes may artificially gain the ability to copy know-how (from humans), which means that the experimental data derived from such individuals cannot stand in for performances of wild apes and species in general (artificiality of cognition and test conditions). Since early 2010s Tennie has refined and extended the ZLS theory and its predictions. For example, he later proposed a clarification that a ZLS-derived resulting solution is expected to have little to no path dependent detailed variability in contrast to a solution that would require a multitude of successive transmission events ("cumulative culture") based on know-how copying.

Overall, the original hypothesis by Tennie, et al. 2009 already proposed that the behaviours exhibited by great apes can be invented and sometimes are invented by culturally unconnected individuals independently, even if some of these independent inventions happen at low frequencies. According to Tennie, ape culture exists, but is limited to the (evolving) boundaries of their species' ZLS. This proposal follows and was inspired by classical conclusions by Köhler on restricted patterns in chimpanzee social learning and by Vygotsky on special ways in which humans culturally grow. The very term zone of latent solutions is designed to act as the baseline extension of Vygotskys variously named zones of development

While documented ape cultural practices appear to sometimes be geographically restricted and are often interpreted as unique to the given populations and, with it, human-like in expression and underlying social learning demands. Tennie and colleagues suggest an alternative, parsimonious explanation. They proposed socially mediated solution (re-)invention, which, according to them, depends on three main and interacting factors: "(i) the species' cognitive and learning skills, as well as biological predispositions (where these exist); (ii) the ecologies to which the population is and were exposed; and (iii) the social situation in terms of the age and rank and number of practitioners that are and were potentially observable, as well as the general 'sociability' of the species". Social learning of various types, though absent know-how copying, can then create and maintain ape cultures in interaction with individual learning and the environment. In accordance with this view, especially with the view that know-how copying is not necessary, Tennie and colleagues were able to show that the vast majority of claims of locally unique solutions were erroneously labelled. Instead, these behaviours appear independently elsewhere, i.e. were not locally unique; just as the ZLS theory predicts.

== ZLS and human evolution ("STONECULT" project) ==
In 2017 Tennie was awarded an ERC Starting Project "STONECULT" funding to research the timeline of cumulative cultural know-how in the human lineage. Tennie proposed that time of the onset of this special type of cultural evolution in the human lineage can be tested based on a reanalysis of paleoanthropological and extant primate material artifacts and behaviours, supplemented by experiments and models. According to evolutionary theory, replication-based cultural evolution should lead to an increasing artifact variability over time, across species and across the landscape, in path-dependent manners.

However, the earliest types of stone tools, such as Oldowan and early Acheulean stone tools, show a lack of such differentiated variation over (culturally relevant) time, species and space. Tennie and his colleagues interpret these stases in the light of the ZLS theory. These patterns are expected patterns if socially mediated re-innovation of know how were responsible, in the absence or near absence of know how copying.

Similarly to the extant ape cultures, early stone tools would then have been cultural, but would have fully or partially lacked know-how copying; lacking one of the necessary factors that could have driven their cultural evolution in fast, diversifying and path-dependent ways. The STONECULT project's findings majorly supported this critical view as they showed that the earliest behavioral know-how required for the earliest stone tools does not require know-how copying. The project showed that naive, captive orangutans can spontaneously perform such know how to make artifacts resembling the earliest stone tools. An agent-based model also demonstrated that ape-like and early hominin-like cultural patterns do not require know-how copying. Even ways to shape early handaxes proved to not require special types of know-how copying in exprimental tests on naive humans. Taken all these studies into consideration, upon completion of "STONECULT" project, Tennie concluded that the emergence of special, replicatory types of cultural evolution of know-how in hominins should be attributed to a later time, i.e. to within the last million years.

== Selected works ==
- Tennie, Claudio (23 February 2023). "The Earliest Tools and Cultures of Hominins". In Tehrani, Jamshid J.; et al. (eds.). Oxford Handbook of Cultural Evolution (1 ed.). Oxford University Press. pp. 431–446. ISBN 978-0-19-886925-2.
- Tennie, Claudio; Snyder, William D.; Planer, Ronald J. (June 2025). "Costs of Early Stone Toolmaking cannot Establish the Presence of Know-how Copying". Human Nature. 36 (2): 180–218. doi:10.1007/s12110-025-09494-w.
- Planer, Ronald J.; Bandini, Elisa; Tennie, Claudio (2025). "Hominin tool evolution and its (surprising) relation to language origins". In Raviv, Limor; Boeckx, Cedric (eds.). The Oxford Handbook of Approaches to Language Evolution. pp. 553–576.
- Buskell, Andrew; Tennie, Claudio (1 March 2025). "Mere Recurrence and Cumulative Culture at the Margins". The British Journal for the Philosophy of Science. 76 (1): 123–145. doi:10.1086/717776.
- Andersson, Claes; Tennie, Claudio (17 July 2023). "Zooming out the microscope on cumulative cultural evolution: 'Trajectory B' from animal to human culture". Humanities and Social Sciences Communications. 10 (1): 402. doi:10.1057/s41599-023-01878-6. ISSN 2662-9992.
- Tennie, Claudio; Hopper, Lydia M.; Van Shaik, Carel P. (2020). "On the origin of cumulative culture: Consideration of the role of copying in culture-dependent traits and a reappraisal of the zone of latent solutions hypothesis.". In Hopper, L. M.; Ross, S. R. (eds.). Chimpanzees in Context: A Comparative Perspective on Chimpanzee Behavior, Cognition, Conservation, and Welfare. University of Chicago Press. ISBN 978-0-226-72798-1.
- Tennie, Claudio; Bandini, Elisa; van Schaik, Carel P.; Hopper, Lydia M. (October 2020). "The zone of latent solutions and its relevance to understanding ape cultures". Biology & Philosophy. 35 (5). doi:10.1007/s10539-020-09769-9. PMC 7548278.
- Bandini, Elisa; Motes-Rodrigo, Alba; Steele, Matthew P.; Rutz, Christian; Tennie, Claudio (24 June 2020). "Examining the mechanisms underlying the acquisition of animal tool behaviour". Biology Letters. 16 (6). doi:10.1098/rsbl.2020.0122. PMC 7336849.
- Henrich, J.; Tennie, C. (31 December 2017). "18. Cultural Evolution in Chimpanzees and Humans". In Muller, M.N.; Wrangham, R.W.; Pilbeam, D.R. (eds.). Chimpanzees and Human Evolution. Harvard University Press. pp. 645–702. ISBN 978-0-674-98264-2.
- Tennie, Claudio; Premo, L. S.; Braun, David R.; McPherron, Shannon P. (October 2017). "Early Stone Tools and Cultural Transmission: Resetting the Null Hypothesis". Current Anthropology. 58 (5): 652–672. doi:10.1086/693846. hdl:10261/357684.
- Acerbi, Alberto; Tennie, Claudio (February 2016). "The role of redundant information in cultural transmission and cultural stabilization". Journal of Comparative Psychology. 130 (1): 62–70. doi:10.1037/a0040094. hdl:11572/359770. PMC 4763254.
