= The Creeps! =

2008 video game

- Developer: Super Squawk Software
- Platforms: Android, iOS
- Release: December 23, 2008 (iOS)
- Genre: Tower defense
- Mode: Single-player

The Creeps! is a 2008 tower defense video game developed by Super Squawk Software for iOS and Android devices. The player must prevent monsters (referred to as 'creeps') from reaching a child's bed by placing towers that destroy them. The Creeps! was followed by sequels The Creeps! Holiday Edition and The Creeps! 2.

== Gameplay ==
Towers may be placed to destroy or slow down enemy creeps

The Creeps! is a tower defense game, and the player must prevent monsters (referred to as 'creeps') coming out of a closet from reaching a child's bed by destroying the monsters with towers placed around the level. Creeps arrive in waves, and travel along a path from the closet door to the bed; bosses appear every ten waves. The bed has ten health, and if too many creeps reach the bed, the game ends. Towers may be purchased using coins and can be upgraded by the player, increasing damage and firing speed. Coins are earned by destroying creeps. Towers will automatically attack enemies within range, or targets may be selected manually by the player. Some levels have a super tower, which has varying abilities (such as temporarily creating a UFO that damages creeps in its path) that are controlled by tilting the device using accelerometer-based controls. Obstacles such as tombstones are scattered around each map, and may be destroyed for coins, and frees the tile for building towers. The game has three levels of difficulty: easy, medium, and hard. Higher levels of difficulty increases the health of enemy creeps.

The Creeps! has three gamemodes: Survival, Endurance, and Door Buster. In Survival levels, the player must survive a given number of waves. In Endurance levels, the player must live as long as possible as the game gets progressively more difficult, and in Door Buster levels, the player must destroy the closet door that creeps spawn from. The Creeps! includes twelve survival and endurance mode levels, and six door buster levels; additional levels may be bought using cookies - cookies may be bought through in-app purchases, or earned through playing the game. Badges may be earned on each level for completing various objectives, such as beating the level on each level of difficulty or destroying all obstacles on the map.

High scores may be submitted to an online leaderboard. During play, the game can be run at double speed and toggled back to normal speed with a button.

== Development ==
References to other mobile games were added in updates to the game, including pygmies from Pocket God and a Doodle Jump themed tower.

== Reception ==
Reception

Review scores
Publication	Score
AppSpy	5/5 (iOS)
Common Sense Media	5/5 (iOS)
148Apps	4/5 (iOS)

AppSpy praised the game's graphics and sound effects, as well as its replay value, calling it "a great game with a lot of style and diversity in its gameplay". TouchArcade described the game as "surprisingly challenging".

148Apps praised the game's gameplay, noting specific features such as manual targeting & double speed, but criticized the game's UI, expressing that some buttons are too close together.

Common Sense Media called the game "excellent", praising its difficulty curve and replayability, as well as its graphics, calling its spooky theme "adorable and fun".

== Legacy ==
The Creeps! was followed by sequels The Creeps! Holiday Edition for iOS, and The Creeps! 2 for iOS & Android.
