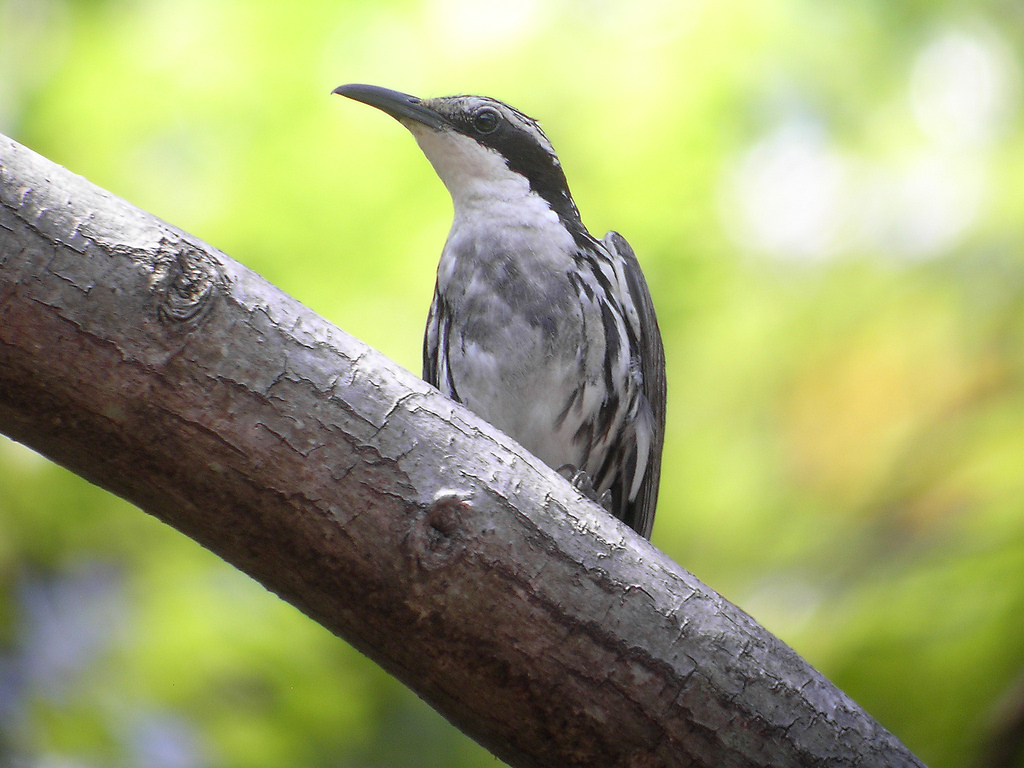
- At Subic Bay, Luzon

Conservation status
- Least Concern (IUCN 3.1)

Scientific classification
- Kingdom: Animalia
- Phylum: Chordata
- Class: Aves
- Order: Passeriformes
- Family: Sturnidae
- Genus: Rhabdornis
- Species: R. mystacalis

Binomial name
- Rhabdornis mystacalis (Temminck, 1825)

= Stripe-headed rhabdornis =

Species of bird

The stripe-headed rhabdornis or stripe-headed creeper (Rhabdornis mystacalis), also known as the stripe-sided rhabdornis, is a species of bird currently placed in the starling family, Sturnidae. It is endemic to the Philippines.

== Description and taxonomy ==
=== Subspecies ===
Three subspecies are recognized:

- R.m. mystacalis — Found on Luzon, Catanduanes Masbate, Panay and Negros
- R.m. minor —Found on Mindanao, Basilan, Samar, Leyte, Biliran, Bohol, Dinagat Islands and Calicoan Island

The subspecies minor is smaller and has a shorter bill.

== Ecology and behavior ==
Feeds on a varied diet including insects, fruits and seeds. Forages in flocks of up to 20 individuals and also joins smixed species flocks.

Birds collected in breeding condition with enlarged gonads in February to July. Nests in small tree cavities. Not much else is known about this despite its relative commonness.

== Habitat and conservation status ==
Its natural habitats at tropical moist lowland primary forest and secondary forest up to 1,000 meters above sea level.

The IUCN Red List has assessed this bird as least-concern species as it is still common throughout its large range. The population is still decreasing due to the habitat loss and deforestation in the Philippines. More studies are recommended to better understand this species, population and conservation status.
