= Scope creep =

Project management issue

In project management, scope creep is continuous or uncontrolled growth in a project's scope, generally experienced after the project begins. This can occur when the scope of a project is not properly defined, documented, or controlled. It is generally considered harmful. These harms include overruns in costs, schedule, or both. Though if scope creep is well managed, it can help projects by creating a better final product. Scope creep cannot be entirely prevented, so mitigating its harms is done by managing it after noticing it. Scope creep has at least some presence in every project, and it can endanger many of them. Scope creep is also known as requirement creep, kitchen sink syndrome, mission creep, or feature creep, with the last two relating especially to government/military projects and software projects, respectively. Sometimes, scope creep and feature creep are defined separately, with scope creep referring to scope enlargements and feature creep referring to adding extra features.

== Common causes ==
=== Poorly defined project scope ===
Ineffective project management communication between a client and the project manager is a leading effect of project scope creep. An assignment that is not understood correctly will turn out to be completely different from clients vision. With that being said clients can also be to blame as they may not possess a clear vision of what they want.

=== Project vagueness or complexity ===
A factor in scope creep is when an unexpected hurdle comes up, and arguments occur on if the scope of work document covers it. When certain documents are either too technical or lack critical details, scope creep can appear through interpreting these documents. As a project is planned to be longer or more complex, instances of scope creep are more likely, which could harm the project.

=== Failure to capture all requirements ===
Properly defining project scope requires thorough investigation by the project manager during the initial planning phase of a project. Failure to gather all information from all relevant stakeholders is a common reason for incomplete scope statements and missing requirements, which can frequently and easily lead to scope creep later in the project. It is essential that everyone on the team understands the project requirements thoroughly—and that the project sponsor and relevant stakeholders have signed off on those requirements—before execution of the project begins.

=== Lack of project management practices ===
Adopting and adhering to standardized project management practices and processes is associated with significantly lower levels of scope creep.

=== Addition of unnecessary features ===
Sometimes project teams tend to start adding additional features in order to impress the client. This may not work and tend to cause more work for such project and throw off the scope.

=== Low cost of change ===
Scope creep can more easily enter projects while presented as small, simple, and easy to implement changes. However, the volume or actual complexity of these changes can risk project failure.

=== Internal additions ===
Often, when project team members cause scope creep, they intend to improve the project, rather than having the expanded scope harm the project. One example is when team members suggest adding new features in the client's presence. Another example is a project team pushing the use of newer technologies, when management or the client may want to use older technology they are used to, which can cause scope creep through retraining and increasing complexity. However, there are some instances in which a member on the project team has a vested interest in causing scope creep. An instance is where someone fears a project will replace them, so they intentionally induce scope creep to delay the project to make its completion a non issue for them. Scope creep can also be used by a project manager seeking to look more competent by handling additional tasks or by a project team to ensure they have work when future uncertainty looms.

=== Client additions ===
Clients may request project additions, causing scope creep, in response to pre-contract agreements or seeing new potential during project development. When clients find missing items and add them to a project, that is scope creep, but there is generally no ill intent behind it. Some clients use scope creep by pointing to unclear items to try to add items they want, but are not required for the project.

=== Communication gap between project stakeholders ===
Another cause of scope creep is the communication gap between the stakeholders. Clients may not respond quickly enough to the project managers, causing the project to run into a bottleneck.

These aspects can affect the operational efficiencies of companies, especially when involved in long-term relationships. Scope creep is a risk in most projects. Most megaprojects fall victim to scope creep (see Megaprojects and Risk). Scope creep often results in cost overrun. A "value for free" strategy is difficult to counteract and remains a difficult challenge for even the most experienced project managers.

== Common effects ==
=== Risking the project by altering project foundations ===
Scope is key for defining both the physical facilities and project deliverables, and scope creep changes at least one of them. By affecting at least one, scope creep goes on to affect other parts of the project, such as project timeframe and cost. One part of how scope creep causes project delays is by creating the need for more meetings to discuss new scope parts and make decisions on if they should be implemented. Costs can go up due to these delays and new risks may emerge due to the new additions. When cost gets too high, the project goes on too long, or both, projects can fail and higher-ups may look for alternatives to the project.

=== Useful changes and advantages ===
Scope creep can give a project advantages, such as by creating a better final product from the perspective of the client or making the final product better than similar products from other projects. When scope creep is controlled, it can help the project meet its needs by allowing useful changes through. Scope changes are common in projects more than a week, and that makes managing scope creep key to avoiding its negative effects while getting the benefits of useful changes.

== Management techniques ==
=== Having clear foundational documents ===
It is critical to have documents that clearly define to both the client and project team what the project's scope is, what the goals are, and the methods for changing the scope. Such documents can help form a foundation for a project, lessening the danger of scope creep. Since requirement uncertainty can create the need for assumptions that cause scope creep, having a project's foundational documents define them can reduce this aspect of scope creep.

=== Questioning or refusing changes ===
When a change is suggested, first analyze it by predicting whether it is excessively costly, in terms of time and money, to add. If the analysis finds no excessive cost, then its implementation can be proposed. Another strategy that can be implemented when changes are proposed is questioning the suggested change to ensure it is well justified. For changes the client proposes, accepting them solely to please the client risks the project, and those changes could be a part of a follow-up project. Occasionally refusing customer requests is key for project management since it can reduce the risk of scope creep causing project cancelation.

== See also ==
- Anti-pattern
- Cost overrun
- Scope (project management)
- Planning poker
- Escalation of commitment
- Instruction creep
- Mission creep
- The Mythical Man-Month
- Second-system effect
- Software bloat
- Development hell
