= Mission creep =

Expansion of a project beyond its initial goals

Mission creep is the gradual or incremental expansion of an intervention, project or mission, beyond its original scope, focus or goals, a ratchet effect spawned by initial success. Mission creep is usually considered undesirable due to how each success breeds more ambitious interventions until a final failure happens, stopping the intervention entirely.

The term was originally applied exclusively to military operations, but has recently been applied to many other fields, making the phrase autological. The phrase first appeared in 1993, in articles published in The Washington Post and in The New York Times concerning the United Nations peacekeeping mission during the Somali Civil War.

== History ==
=== Somali Civil War ===
The first two articles to use the term in the Washington Post were both by columnist Jim Hoagland ("Prepared for Non-Combat", April 15, 1993, and Beware 'mission creep' In Somalia, July 20, 1993). The New York Times used the term for the first time in an article by correspondent John H. Cushman, Jr. written after the October 4, 1993 firefight in the capital of Somalia, Mogadishu, in which eighteen American military personnel were killed.

The U.S. and subsequent United Nations mission in Somalia (Restore Hope) would seem to be a classic example of mission creep. Begun in late 1992 as a U.S. humanitarian relief operation in the final months of the George H. W. Bush administration, the intervention was converted into a U.N. operation on June 4, 1993. While the initial Bush administration justification for entering Somalia focused on "humanitarian assistance," realities on the ground helped drive ever growing requirements. On June 5, 1993, Somali warlord Mohamed Farrah Aidid's clan forces killed 23 Pakistani peacekeepers who were part of the UNISOM II mission. This battle led to a UN Security Council decision seeking to capture those responsible for the deaths of the Pakistani peacekeepers. Along with growing objectives seeking longer term stability (rather than short-term humanitarian assistance), the search for Aidid fostered a more confrontational environment through the summer of 1993. In October 1993, 18 American soldiers died in the Battle of Mogadishu. This incident led to a much more defensive U.S. and UN presence in Somalia. U.S. forces withdrew in early 1994 and all UN forces were withdrawn in late February and early March 1995 during Operation United Shield.

=== First Libyan Civil War ===
In the context of the First Libyan Civil War, the phrase was used frequently with regard to the intervention on the part of the multi-state coalition. It appeared as early as March 7, 2011, when a Reuters article wrote that Britain's vision of a no-fly zone over the country would be "likely to experience 'mission creep' and move closer to American thinking on the need to target (Libyan leader) Gaddafi's defenses". On March 31, 2011, with the campaign in its second week, U.S. Defense Secretary Robert Gates told a Senate hearing that "I am preoccupied with avoiding mission creep and avoiding having an open-ended, very large-scale American commitment in this respect". A joint article written by the leaders of the United Kingdom, United States and France that appeared on April 14, 2011, stated that Gaddafi "must go, and for good". Some British MPs warned that this statement represented mission creep, as it exceeded the parameters of UN Resolution 1973, which stressed humanitarian objectives and did not include regime change as a stated goal.

=== Retroactive applications of the term ===
Although the term mission creep is a 1990s invention, examples can be observed throughout military history. For instance, many of the wars of Louis XIV's France began with small limited goals, but quickly escalated to much larger affairs.

Another early example of mission creep is the Korean War. It began as an attempt to save South Korea from invasion by the North, but after that initial success expanded to an attempt to reunite the peninsula, a goal that eventually proved unattainable. That attempt resulted in a long and costly retreat through North Korea after the intervention of the Chinese. NBC reporter David Gregory has cited the Vietnam War as an important example of mission creep, defining it as "the idea of, you know, gradually surging up forces, having nation-building goals, and running into challenges all along the way."

In 1956, Aneurin Bevan, politician and architect of Britain's National Health Service, gave a speech before the House of Commons on December 5 against Britain's mission creep in the Suez Crisis against Egypt. "I have been looking through the various objectives and reasons that the government have given to the House of Commons for making war on Egypt, and it really is desirable that when a nation makes war upon another nation it should be quite clear why it does so. It should not keep changing the reasons as time goes on." The speech was considered one of the 14 greatest speeches of the 20th century by The Guardian, along with speeches by Churchill, Kennedy, and Mandela. Eventually the United States, the Soviet Union, and the United Nations played major roles in forcing Britain, France and Israel to withdraw from Egypt.

=== Non-military examples ===
Another example of a non-military use of the term mission creep is in connection with fusion centers. Fusion centers were originally created as a counter-terrorism measure in the wake of the September 11 attacks in 2001 via the Department of Homeland Security. Fusion centers were intended to facilitate the collaboration and sharing of information across various levels of government and private sector entities connected with America's critical infrastructure. By 2011 there were 72 fusion centers in the United States. Fusion centers have been criticized for sharing information on crimes other than terrorism - potentially violating the civil rights of American citizens - which has been described as mission creep.

The International Monetary Fund, founded to maintain fixed exchange rates for developed countries, transitioned to funding developing countries in the 1970s. In 2005, scholars Sarah Babb and Ariel Buira remarked that the evolving goals of the IMF represented mission creep.

Within recent decades U.S. police forces (and SWAT teams in particular) have become increasingly militarized and expanded in focus in a manner described by The Economist as mission creep.

== See also ==
- Bracket creep, the slow movement of lower-income individuals to higher tax brackets as a result of inflation
- Escalation of commitment, continuing a decisive course despite negative outcomes
- Feature creep, an analogous phenomenon in software engineering
- Ratchet effect, the inability of a system to reduce its scope once it expands
- Scope creep, an analogous phenomenon in project management
