= Vanguard Group (anarchist) =

Anarchist political group

- Predecessor: Friends of Freedom
- Successor: Libertarian League
- Formation: 1932; 94 years ago
- Founders: Louis Slater; Sidney Solomon; Tommy Dolgoff; Albert Weiss
- Dissolved: 1939; 87 years ago
- Purpose: Anarcho-communism
- Location: New York City
- Leader: Mark Schmidt
- Main organ: Vanguard: Journal of Libertarian Communism

The Vanguard Group was an anarchist political group active during the 1930s, which published the periodical Vanguard: Journal of Libertarian Communism, led by Sam Dolgoff (aka Sam Weiner, editor of Vanguard). Vanguard was for a time, during the 1930s, the leading English-language anarchist youth organization in New York City.

== History ==
In 1927, the Rising Youth Group was founded in New York by Sara and Elizabeth Goodman, two young Jewish anarchists frustrated with the older generation. By 1929 the group had dissolved and were succeeded by the Bronx-based Friends of Freedom, which became the Vanguard Group in 1932. Despite this new group's inheritance of its predecessor's frustration with their elders, the articles published in their periodical still bore a resemblance to those being published by Road to Freedom and they were themselves inspired by older Jewish anarchist theoreticians such as Emma Goldman and Rudolf Rocker.

The group desired to approach anarchism from less theoretical and more concrete terms, dedicated to developing a positive program to display anarchism as a viable force for social change. An anarcho-communist group, it aimed to construct a nationwide specific anarchist federation that could gain the support of both workers and intellectuals in order to prepare for a social revolution. It supported a united front with other progressive organizations such as the Industrial Workers of the World and the Socialist Party. A split in the organization was caused by one of its leading figures Mark Schmidt, who advocated for uniting with the Communist Party and even supported the Molotov–Ribbentrop Pact. Schmidt's theses was opposed by young members of the organization, particularly by Paul Avrich and Abe Bluestein, the latter of whom broke off from the organization to found the Challenge Group. Schmidt increasingly gravitated towards Stalinism, defending the Soviet Union and even surveilling the remaining group's members, including Sam Dolgoff, who had previously sided with Schmidt. This led to some older anarchists branding the Vanguard Group as "anarcho-Bolsheviks".

The Vanguard Group had dissolved by the time of the United States' entry into World War II. Jewish anarchists, including Rudolf Rocker who had himself fled Nazi Germany, largely supported the Allied war effort out of an anti-fascist conviction. While some members of the Vanguard Group even went as far as to join the United States Army to fight in the war, others quit the group due to their anti-militarist opposition to the war, joining the Why? Group in 1942.

== See also ==
- Anarchist organizations

== Bibliography ==
- Avrich, Paul (2005) [1995]. Anarchist Voices: An Oral History of Anarchism in America. Edinburgh: AK Press. ISBN 1904859275. OCLC 475176999.
