= Libertarian Book Club and League =

Post-WWII anarchist groups in New York City

Libertarian League
- Abbreviation: LL
- Predecessor: Vanguard Group
- Formation: 1945; 81 years ago (Libertarian Book Club); 1954; 72 years ago (Libertarian League)
- Founders: Sam Dolgoff; Esther Dolgoff; Russell Blackwell
- Dissolved: 1965; 61 years ago
- Purpose: Libertarian socialism Anarcho-syndicalism
- Location: New York City, United States
- Main organ: Views and Comments

The Libertarian Book Club and Libertarian League were two postwar anarchist groups in New York City associated with Sam and Esther Dolgoff.

== Libertarian Book Club ==
The Libertarian Book Club was an anarchist circle in postwar New York City. Established by Sam and Esther Dolgoff in 1945 at the behest of Grigorii Maksimov, the group held monthly discussion fora and social events in a rented Workmen's Circle room and served as a social center for a small, aging group of immigrant radicals whom the Dolgoffs knew from their work on Road to Freedom and Vanguard. Sicilian-born anarchist Valerio Isca was one of the co-founders.

The Libertarian Book Club published multiple volumes and distributed domestically other major books and international publications from the anarchist movement. The publisher reprinted Steven T. Byington's English translation of Paul Eltzbacher's Anarchism in 1960.

== Libertarian League ==
In 1954, the Dolgoffs and anarchist Russell Blackwell formed the Libertarian League to supplement the Book Club. In their founding statement, titled "What We Stand For", the League suggested an alternative to the bipolar Cold War: a libertarian socialist society with a worldwide federation of free communities, cooperatives, and workers' councils. Sam Dolgoff described their aims as anarcho-syndicalist society with anarcho-communist sympathies.The League hosted weekly political discussions and published Views and Comments.

Only a few members joined the league at first and though others cycled in and out, attendance at group meetings rarely went above a dozen. Notably, core members of the group were librarians and printers, decidedly more professionalized than the industrial unionism for which they advocated.

Views and Comments began as a mimeographed newsletter and became a monthly journal between 20 and 40 pages. Its aesthetic predated that of the 1980s zines. Contributors were commonly anonymous or used pseudonyms, given fears stemming from McCarthyism.

The League dissolved in mid-1965.

== Bibliography ==
- Avrich, Paul (1995). "Introduction to Part Six". Anarchist Voices: An Oral History of Anarchism in America. Princeton: Princeton University Press. pp. 415–. ISBN 978-0691034126. OCLC 68772773.
- Cornell, Andrew (2016). Unruly Equality: U.S. Anarchism in the Twentieth Century. Oakland: University of California Press. ISBN 978-0520286757.
