= Abe Bluestein =

American anarchist (1909–1997)

- Born: November 1, 1909; Philadelphia, United States
- Died: December 3, 1997 (aged 88); Croton-on-Hudson, New York, United States

Abraham Bluestein (1909–1997) was an American anarchist who participated in the Spanish Civil War.

== Life and career ==
Abraham Bluestein, known as Abe, was born in Philadelphia on November 1, 1909, to Russian immigrants Mendel (Max) and Esther Bluestein. His parents had been active Russian revolutionaries and fled the country after his father killed a tsarist soldier. In the United States, they were involved in the organization of the International Ladies Garment Workers Union (ILGWU) and often discussed anarchism at home. While in grade school, his parents transferred him to the Stelton Modern School on the anarchist Ferrer Colony in New Jersey. He attended public high school in New Brunswick, New Jersey and graduated from City College of New York. In college, he joined the anarchist Vanguard Group, where he met Selma Cohen, who became his wife. In the 1930s, he edited Vanguard's self-titled Vanguard publication and Challenge. After college, Bluestein worked as a teacher.

Bluestein and Cohen, a visual artist, were anarchist activists and together traveled to Spain during its Civil War to support the antifascist Republicans in 1937. Based in Barcelona and Catalonia, Bluestein reported for the Canadian Broadcasting Company and served as an information officer for the Republican-aligned, anarcho-syndicalist labor union Confederación Nacional del Trabajo. While in Spain, he met the anarchists Emma Goldman and Augustin Souchy.

After the war, Bluestein and Cohen settled in Croton-on-Hudson, New York, where they raised four children. As a pacifist during World War II, Bluestein became alienated from the antifascist anarchists. He wrote for The Jewish Daily Forward and American Labor Union Journal after the war. Bluestein participated in the Libertarian Book Club and edited the 1983 memorial volume, Fighters for Anarchism: Mollie Steimer and Senya Fleshin. He continued to speak and translate works on Spanish anarchism, such as Souchy's With the Peasants of Aragón, and edited two publications on Spanish anarchism after the fall of fascist Spain. Bluestein was heavily involved in New York's cooperative housing movement and managed ILGWU's Manhattan cooperative houses and the Bronx Amalgamated and Co-op City houses. He became less active as an anarchist, though he retained prominent anarchist friends, and continued to advocate for labor unions and cooperatives through his death on December 3, 1997, in a Croton nursing home.

== Bibliography ==
- Avrich, Paul (1995). "Abe Bluestein". Anarchist Voices: An Oral History of Anarchism in America. Princeton: Princeton University Press. pp. 435–439. ISBN 978-0-691-03412-6. OCLC 68772773.
- Cornell, Andrew (2016). Unruly Equality: U.S. Anarchism in the Twentieth Century. Oakland: University of California Press. ISBN 978-0-520-28675-7.
- Gay, Kathlyn; Gay, Martin (1999). "Bluestein, Abraham (1909–1997)". Encyclopedia of Political Anarchy. ABC-CLIO. p. 32. ISBN 978-0-87436-982-3.
- Glaberman, Martin; Rawick, George P. (1974). "Challenge". In Conlin, Joseph R. (ed.). The American Radical Press, 1880–1960. Westport, Connecticut: Greenwood Press. pp. 420–422. ISBN 0-8371-6625-X.
- Thomas, Robert McG. Jr. (December 14, 1997). "Abraham Bluestein, 88, Dies; An Advocate of Anarchism". The New York Times. ISSN 0362-4331.
