= Yvette Charpentier =

Quebec seamstress and labour organizer, 1901–1976

Yvette Charpentier OC
- Born: 1901; Montreal, Quebec, Canada
- Died: 15 October 1976 (aged 74–75)
- Occupations: Seamstress; Union executive
- Organization: International Ladies Garment Workers Union (ILGWU)

Yvette Charpentier (1901–1976) was a French-Canadian seamstress and labour organizer. She worked as a seamstress in Montreal from the age of 13, living in poverty. In 1937, she was the first garment worker at her factory to sign a union contract, and that same year she rallied thousands of workers on a 25-day strike. Charpentier helped to form a grievance committee and provided education for the female workers, and in 1945 was elected to the local executive board of the International Ladies Garment Workers Union (ILGWU). When Charpentier retired in 1970, the newspapers called her "the godmother of 10,000 shop girls". She was invested as an Officer of the Order of Canada for her work to improve the working conditions of women.

== Early life ==
Yvette Charpentier was born in 1901, the daughter of Alfred Charpentier and Celina Girard. She started working at age 10, selling paper flowers and stirring chocolate, and in 1914 began factory work in the textile industry, called the rag trade.

In the workshops on Saint Catherine Street, Charpentier worked more than 60 hours a week for a meagre wage. In her first eleven years of factory work, she was hospitalized three times for illnesses brought on by working and living conditions. She was regularly visited by hunger, exhaustion, the demands of foremen, and factory closings. Charpentier stated, "Because of this degrading and vile system, I felt humiliated and devoid of any human worth."

== Union activism ==
With the 1934 passing of the Arcand Act in Quebec, there was a structure for legally sanctioned collective agreements in the province's textile industry. However, the manufacturers and their syndicates used ethnic prejudice to divide French Canadian workers from other workers, who were mostly Jewish and Jewish-led. The New York-based International Ladies Garment Workers Union (ILGWU; French: l'Union Internationale des ouvriers du vêtement pour dames, UIOVD) entered the scene with a focused recruitment drive to attract workers and register a collective agreement with the government before the Catholic unions could do so.

In 1937, ILGWU organizers came to the factory Charpentier worked at and held a recruitment meeting. Charpentier was initially wary of the unions: "Like most girls in the shops, I was suspicious, confused. After all, which of us knew the meaning of a union? To sign up with the union meant to be a pioneer and most people aren't interested in pioneering – particularly if it might cost them their bread and butter."

Charpentier asked the organizers:

Serez-vous capables, si nous adhérons à l'union, de mettre fin aux injustices que nous devons subir pour gagner notre vie?

Translation:

If we join the union, will you be able to put an end to the injustices we have to endure to earn a living?

Her question was answered by Claude Jodoin, who promised to fight to see that such would never happen again. Charpentier noted this as the moment her life changed. Emboldened by Jodoin's promise, Charpentier turned to the other women and declared:

Okay, vous autres, il faut nous décider: ou bien nous demeurons des esclaves ou bien nous devenons des femmes libres.

Translation:

Okay, everyone, we have to decide: either we remain slaves, or we become free women.

Charpentier was the first garment worker at her factory, and the first in haut de la ville (uptown Montreal), to sign a union contract. Her entire workshop followed her and joined the union.

The next morning, when her foreman tried his usual intimidation tactics, she rebuffed him and demanded her rights. Resenting their continued denial of basic dignity, the women pushed the union to call for a strike which began in mid-April 1937.

=== Ragpickers' Strike of 1937 ===
The 25-day strike, called the grève de la guenille (Ragpickers' Strike), resulted in better working conditions, a 44-hour work week and a substantial pay increase. The strike received a Canadian heritage designation in 2007 as a national historic event, noting Charpentier's leadership alongside that of Rose Pesotta and Léa Roback in rallying more than 5,000 female workers and demonstrating the ability of Jewish and French-Canadian workers to cooperate. The strike was also notable for being the first action to defy the Padlock Law, provincial anti-Communist legislation which was used to persecute trade unionists.

While the strike was successful in achieving the union leadership's demands, it failed to address the female workers' demands regarding sexual harassment by their superiors. Despite the vast majority of ILGWU members being women, important positions in the union leadership were held by men and the union negotiators were disinterested in female empowerment. Roback and Charpentier continued where the leadership had failed, forming a grievance committee and providing education for the female workers, to help them understand dignified working conditions.

=== Union executive ===
In 1945, Charpentier was elected to the ILGWU executive board. She later became head of the education department.

When she retired in 1970, the newspapers called her La Marraine de dix mille midinettes (Note: The term midinette, literally "midday dinner", was first used for the seamstresses of Paris who, when the clock struck noon, would flood the boulevards and parks to eat a few bites of food on the tiny lunch break allowed to them. See definition on Wiktionary.) (English: the godmother of 10,000 shop girls), this being the estimated number of female garment workers who benefitted from the education classes she initiated.

== Later life ==
On 31 March 1971, Charpentier was invested as a Officer of the Order of Canada for her lifelong work "to improve the working conditions of women in plants and factories."

Charpentier died on 15 October 1976, in Montreal.
