= Russell Blackwell =

American anarchist

- Born: March 24, 1904
- Died: August 1969 (aged 65)
- Occupation: Cartographer
- Known for: Anarchist and Trotskyist activism

Russell Blackwell (March 24, 1904 – August 1969) was an American anarchist and former communist.

== Life ==
Russell Blackwell was a communist in the 1920s and a Trotskyist in the 1930s. He left the United States to establish a communist organization for children, the Pioneers, in Mexico, where he adopted the pseudonym Rosario Negrete. Working with Manuel Rodriguez, Blackwell founded the Mexico's first Trotskyist organization, Oposición Comunista de Izquierda ("Communist Left Opposition", or OCI) in 1933. Teachers Luciano Galicia and Octavio Fernandez withdrew from the Communist Party to join the group in 1934. The organization became the Liga Comunista Internacionalista in late 1934 and published Nueva Internacional, which published works by Trotsky and fundraised for artists.

In the United States, following fallout in the Trotskyist Workers Party, a faction known as Oehler-Stamm broke off to found the Revolutionary Workers League. Blackwell was a major personality in the League. The group sent Blackwell to become a POUM combatant at the outbreak of the Spanish Civil War. In Spain, he converted to anarchism and was a member of the Friends of Durruti Group. Upon his return, he retreated into his family and cartography career in the 1940s. In 1954, he sought to return to activism with fellow anarchists and friends Sam and Esther Dolgoff with the founding of the Libertarian League.

== Bibliography ==
- Alexander, Robert Jackson (1991). International Trotskyism, 1929-1985: A Documented Analysis of the Movement. Duke University Press. ISBN 978-0-8223-1066-2.
- Cornell, Andrew (2016). Unruly Equality: U.S. Anarchism in the Twentieth Century. Oakland: University of California Press. ISBN 978-0-520-28675-7.
