= The Anarchist Collectives =

1974 book by Sam Dolgoff

- Subject: Anarchism, Spanish Civil War, collective settlements
- Published: 1974 (Free Life Editions)
- Pages: 192
- ISBN: 0919618219

The Anarchist Collectives: Workers’ Self-Management in the Spanish Revolution, 1936–1939 is a collection of essays about the Spanish Revolution of 1936. Edited by Sam Dolgoff, it features contributions by Murray Bookchin, Isaac Puente, Gaston Leval, Augustin Souchy, José Peirats, Alardo Prats and H.E. Kaminski. It was initially published in 1974 by Free Life Editions. By arrangement with Free Life Editions, Black Rose Books subsequently published a Canadian edition in 1990.
