= Anarcho-Syndicalist Review =

American anarchist magazine

- Cover of the Winter 2017 issue
- Editor(s): Jon Bekken; Mike Hargis; Mike Long; Iain McKay; Jeff Stein
- Frequency: Biannually/Quarterly
- Founder: Sam Dolgoff
- Founded: May 1, 1986; 39 years ago
- First issue: May 1, 1986
- Country: United States
- Based in: Philadelphia, Pennsylvania, U.S.
- Language: English
- Website: syndicalist.us
- ISSN: 1069-1995

Anarcho-Syndicalist Review (also known as ASR, formerly the Libertarian Labor Review) is an American anarchist magazine published multiple times per year that focuses on anarcho-syndicalist theory and practice. It is headquartered in Philadelphia.

== History and scope ==
The magazine was co-founded in 1986 by Sam Dolgoff, and the first issue was published on May 1, 1986. The first 24 issues were published as Libertarian Labor Review in the United States. The editors decided to rename the magazine to Anarcho-Syndicalist Review for the 25th edition in order to avoid confusion with right-libertarian views. ASR is an independent publication unaffiliated with any organizations and distributed by AK Press. The headquarters is in Philadelphia.

ASR publications largely consist of news reports, essays, editorials, and articles; letters, and reviews. The magazine's website includes complete listings of contents for all issues since their first publication, and some contents are available through the site's archive.

Frequently discussed topics in the Anarcho-Syndicalist Review include anarchist history, anarchist economics, worker's unions, environmentalism, international news, antifascism, and racial justice. Over time, the publication has developed a standard format for each magazine. Each issue begins with editorial essays, union news, and international anarchist news, sections that became standard for the magazine in 1999 after the publication's name change. When necessary, ASR includes obituaries for anarcho-syndicalists that have passed since their previous issue. The first of these appeared in Issue 8 of Winter 1990, which included obituaries for Esther Dolgoff, Minnie Corder, and José Peirats. The magazines also include book reviews on subjects relevant to the scope of anarcho-syndicalism.
