= Anarchist communism =

Political school of thought

Anarchist communism (Note: Also known as anarcho-communism or libertarian communism.) is an anarchist school of thought that advocates a form of communism where society is organized through horizontal networks of voluntary associations. It calls for the abolition of hierarchies, as well as private property but retention of personal property and collectively owned items, goods, and services. It supports common ownership of property and the free distribution of resources under the principle of "from each according to his ability, to each according to his needs".

Anarchist communism was first formulated as such in the Italian section of the International Workingmen's Association. The theoretical work of Peter Kropotkin took importance later as it expanded and developed pro-organizationalist and insurrectionary anti-organizationalist section. Examples of anarchist communist societies are the anarchist territories of the Makhnovshchina during the Russian Revolution, and those of the Spanish Revolution, most notably revolutionary Catalonia.

== History ==
=== Forerunners ===
The modern current of communism was founded by the Neo-Babouvists of the journal L'Humanitaire (published in mid-1841), who drew from the "anti-political and anarchist ideas" of Sylvain Maréchal. The foundations of anarcho-communism were laid by Théodore Dézamy in his 1843 work Code de la Communauté, which he formulated as a critique of Étienne Cabet's utopian socialism. In his Code, Dézamy advocated the abolition of money, of the division of labour and of the state. He also championed the introduction of common ownership of property and the distribution of resources "from each according to their ability, to each according to their needs". In anticipation of anarchist communism, Dézamy rejected the need for a transitional stage between capitalism and communism, instead calling for immediate communisation through the direct cessation of commerce.

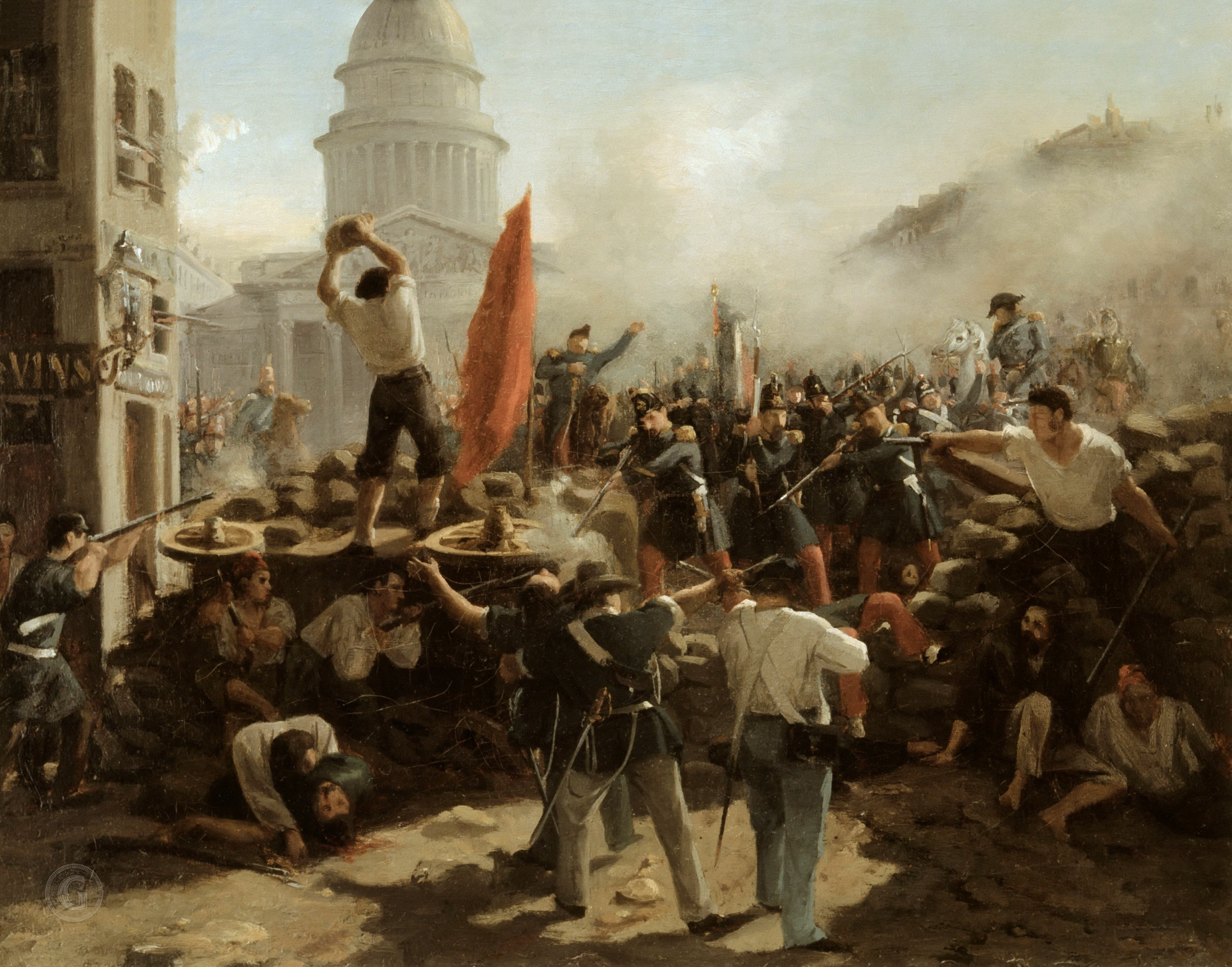
Painting of the June Days uprising of 1848, which Joseph Déjacque considered to be a social revolution by the proletariat

Following the French Revolution of 1848, Joseph Déjacque formulated a radical form of communism that opposed both the revolutionary republicanism of Auguste Blanqui and the mutualism of Pierre-Joseph Proudhon. Déjacque opposed the authoritarian conception of a "dictatorship of the proletariat" as discussed by Joseph Weydemeyer and by Karl Marx from 1852 onwards; he regarded it as inherently reactionary and counter-revolutionary. Instead, he upheld the autonomy and self-organisation of workers, which he saw expressed during the 1848 June Days uprising in Paris against the representative politics of governmentalism. Opposed not just to government, but to all forms of oppression, Déjacque advocated for a social revolution to abolish the state, as well as religion, what would become known as the nuclear family, and private property. In their place, Déjacque upheld a form of anarchy based on the free distribution of resources.

Déjacque particularly focused his critique on private commerce, such as that espoused by Proudhon and by the Ricardian socialists of the 1820s and 1830s. He advocated workers' right to the satisfaction of their needs, rather than to keep the product of their own labour, as he felt the latter would inevitably lead to capital accumulation. He thus advocated for all property to be held under common ownership and for "unlimited freedom of production and consumption", subordinated only to the authority of the "statistics book". In order to guarantee the universal satisfaction of needs, Déjacque saw the need for the abolition of forced labour through workers' self-management, and the abolition of the division of labour through integrating the proletariat and the intelligentsia into a single class. In order to achieve this vision of a communist society, he proposed a transitionary period in which direct democracy and direct exchange would be upheld, positions of state would undergo democratization, and the police and military would be abolished.

Déjacque's communist platform, outlined in his Humanisphere (1859), preceded the program of the 1871 Paris Commune, and anticipated the anarcho-communism later elaborated by Errico Malatesta, Peter Kropotkin and Luigi Galleani.

Anarchist theoretician Peter Kropotkin claimed William Godwin was a proto-anarchist communist.

=== Formulation in the International Workingmen's Association ===
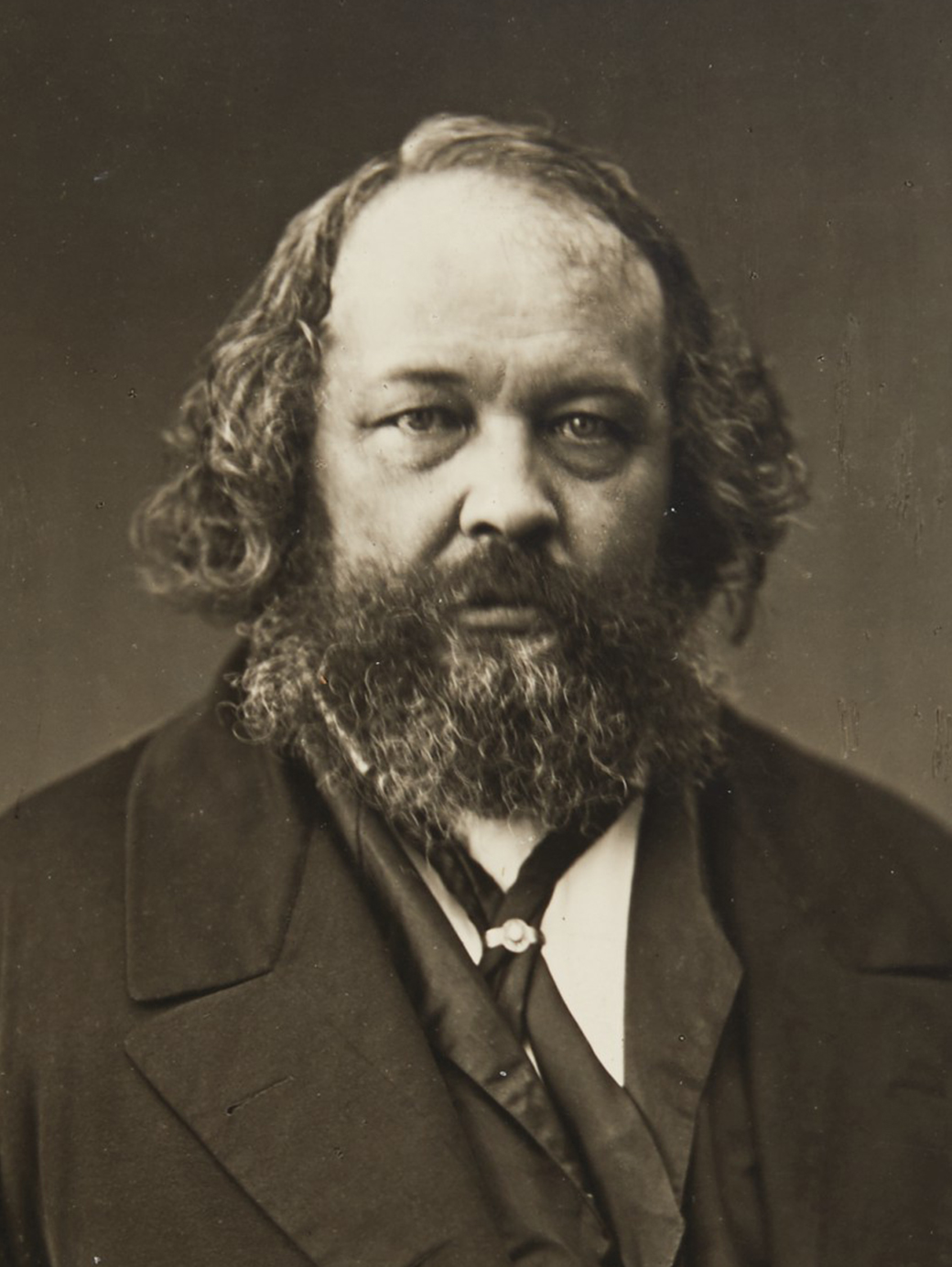
Mikhail Bakunin led the anti-authoritarian faction within the International Workingmen's Association.

The International Workingmen's Association (IWA) was established in 1864, at a time when a formalised anarchist movement did not yet exist. Of the few individual anarchists who were influential at this time, it was Pierre-Joseph Proudhon, with his conception of federalism and his advocacy of abstentionism, who inspired many of the French delegates who founded the IWA and laid the groundwork for the growth of anarchism. Among the French delegates were a more radical minority that opposed Proudhon's mutualism, which held the nuclear family as its base social unit. Led by the trade-unionist Eugène Varlin, the radicals advocated for a "non-authoritarian communism", which upheld the commune as the base social unit and advocated for the universal access to education. The entry of Mikhail Bakunin into the IWA in 1868 first infused the federalists with a programme of revolutionary socialism and anti-statism, which agitated for workers' self-management and direct action against capitalism and the state.

By this time, the Marxists of the IWA had begun to denounce their anti-authoritarian opponents as "anarchists", a label previously adopted by Proudhon and Déjacque and later accepted by the anti-authoritarians themselves. Following the defeat of the Paris Commune in 1871, the IWA split over questions of socialist economics and the means of bringing about a classless society. Karl Marx, who favoured the conquest of state power by political parties, banned the anarchists from the IWA. The anarchist faction around the Jura Federation resolved to reconstitute as their own Anti-Authoritarian International, which they constructed as a more decentralised and federal organisation. Two of the IWA's largest branches, in Italy and Spain, repudiated Marxism and adopted the anti-authoritarian platform.

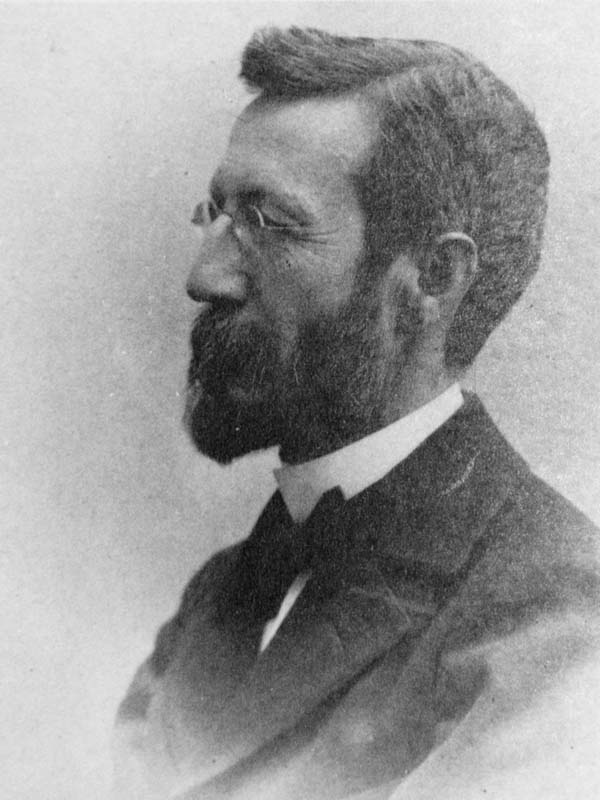
James Guillaume's work set the foundation for the development of communism from collectivism.

As a collectivist, Bakunin had himself opposed communism, which he regarded as an inherently authoritarian ideology. But with Bakunin's death in 1876, the anarchists began to shift away from his theory of collectivism and towards an anarchist communism. The term "anarchist communism" was first printed in François Dumartheray's February 1876 pamphlet, To manual workers, supporters of political action. Élisée Reclus was quick to express his support for anarchist communism, at a meeting of the Anti-Authoritarian International in Lausanne the following month. James Guillaume's August 1876 pamphlet, Ideas on Social Organisation, outlined a proposal by which the collective ownership of the means of production could be used in order to transition towards a communist society. Guillaume considered a necessary prerequisite for communism would be a general condition of abundance, which could set the foundation for the abandonment of exchange value and the free distribution of resources. This program for anarcho-communism was adopted by the Italian anarchists, who had already begun to question collectivism.

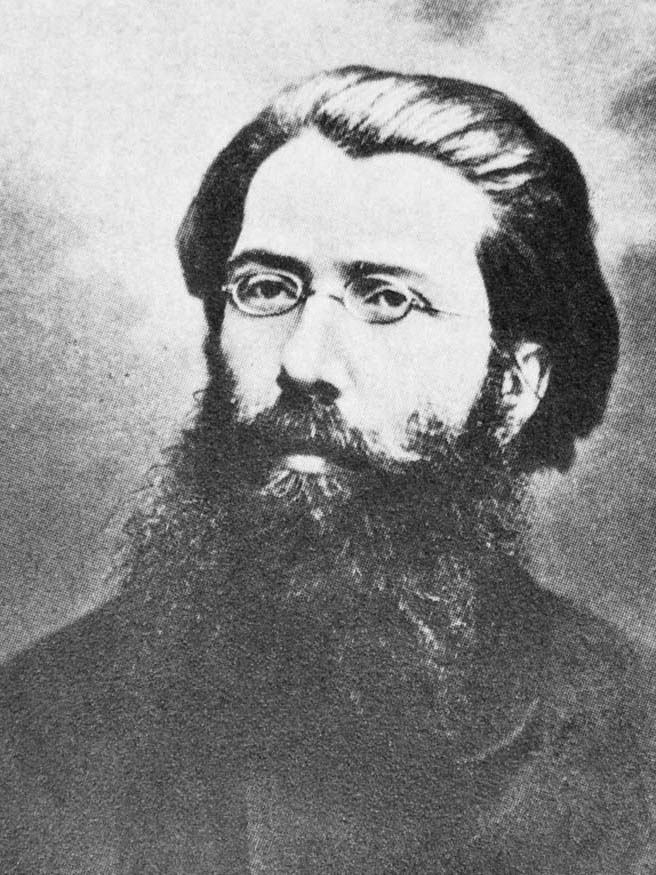
Carlo Cafiero led the break from collectivist anarchism with the first programme for anarchist communism.

Although Guillaume had himself remained neutral throughout the debate, in September 1877, the Italian anarcho-communists clashed with the Spanish collectivists in Verviers at what would be the Anti-Authoritarian International's final congress. Alongside the economic question, the two factions were also divided by the question of organisation. While the collectivists upheld trade unions as a means for achieving anarchy, the communists considered them to be inherently reformist and counter-revolutionary organisations, prone to bureaucracy and corruption. Instead, the communists preferred small, loosely-organised affinity groups, which they believed closer conformed to anti-authoritarian principles.

In October 1880, a Congress of the defunct International's Jura Federation adopted Carlo Cafiero's programme of Anarchy and Communism, which outlined a clear break with Guillaume's collectivist programme. Cafiero rejected the use of an exchange value and the collective ownership of industry, which he believed would lead to capital accumulation and consequently to social stratification. Instead, Cafiero called for the abolition of all wage labour (which he saw as a relic of capitalism) and for the distribution of resources "from each according to their ability, to each according to their needs".

=== Organizationalism vis-à-vis insurrectionarism and expansion ===
As anarcho-communism emerged in the mid-19th century, it had an intense debate with Bakuninist collectivism and, within the anarchist movement, over participation in the workers' movement, as well as on other issues. So in Kropotkin's anarcho-communist theory of evolution, the risen people themselves are meant to be the rational industrial manager rather than a working class organized as enterprise.

Between 1880 and 1890, with the "perspective of an immanent revolution", which was "opposed to the official workers' movement, which was then in the process of formation (general Social Democratisation) [anarchist communists] were opposed not only to political (statist) struggles but also to strikes which put forward wage or other claims, or which were organised by trade unions." However, "[w]hile they were not opposed to strikes as such, they were opposed to trade unions and the struggle for the eight-hour day. This anti-reformist tendency was accompanied by an anti-organisational tendency, and its partisans declared themselves in favor of agitation amongst the unemployed for the expropriation of foodstuffs and other articles, for the expropriatory strike and, in some cases, for 'individual recuperation' or acts of terrorism."

Even after Peter Kropotkin and others overcame their initial reservations and decided to enter labor unions, anti-syndicalist anarchist-communists remained, such as Sébastien Faure's Le Libertaire group and Russian partisans of economic terrorism and expropriations.

Most anarchist publications in the United States appeared in Yiddish, German, or Russian. However, the American anarcho-communist journal The Firebrand was published in English, permitting the dissemination of anarchist communist thought to English-speaking populations in the United States.

According to the anarchist historian Max Nettlau, the first use of the term "libertarian communism" came with the 1880 Le Havre anarchist congress used the phrase to identify its doctrines more clearly. The French anarchist journalist Sébastien Faure, later founder and editor of the four-volume Anarchist Encyclopedia, started the weekly paper Le Libertaire (The Libertarian) in 1895.

=== Methods of organizing: platformism vis-à-vis synthesism ===
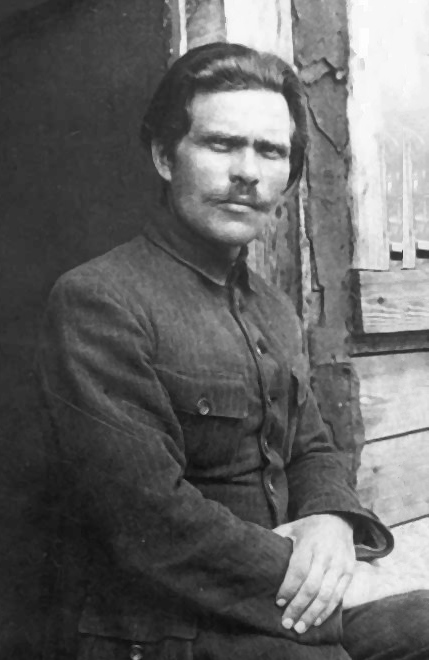
Nestor Makhno, 1921

In Ukraine, the anarcho-communist guerrilla leader Nestor Makhno led an independent anarchist army from 1918 to 1921 during the Russian Civil War of 1917–1923. A commander of the Revolutionary Insurgent Army of Ukraine, Makhno led a guerrilla campaign opposing both the Bolshevik "Reds" and monarchist "Whites". The Makhnovist movement made various tactical military pacts while fighting various reactionary forces and organizing an anarchist society committed to resisting state authority, whether capitalist or Bolshevik.

The Delo truda platform in Spain also met with strong criticism. Miguel Jimenez, a founding member of the Iberian Anarchist Federation (FAI, founded in 1927), summarized this as follows: too much influence in it of Marxism, it erroneously divided and reduced anarchists between individualist anarchists and anarcho-communist sections, and it wanted to unify the anarchist movement along the lines of the anarcho-communists. Jimenez saw anarchism as more complex than that, that anarchist tendencies are not mutually exclusive as the platformists saw it and that both individualist and communist views could accommodate anarcho-syndicalism. Sébastian Faure had strong contacts in Spain, so his proposal had more impact on Spanish anarchists than the Delo truda platform, even though individualist anarchist influence in Spain was less intense than it was in France. The main goal there was reconciling anarcho-communism with anarcho-syndicalism.

=== Spanish Revolution of 1936 ===
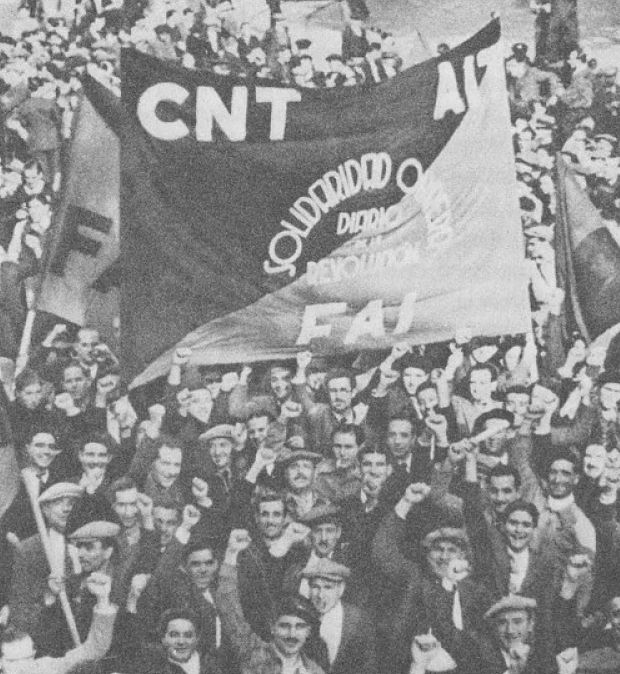
CNT-FAI Anarchists during the Spanish Revolution of 1936

The most extensive application of anarcho-communist ideas happened in the anarchist territories during the Spanish Revolution of 1936.

In Spain, the national anarcho-syndicalist trade union Confederación Nacional del Trabajo (CNT) initially refused to join a popular-front electoral alliance, and abstention by CNT supporters led to a right-wing election victory. In 1936, the CNT changed its policy, and anarchist votes helped bring the popular front back to power. Months later, the former ruling class responded with an attempted coup, which led to the outbreak of the Spanish Civil War of 1936–1939. In response to the army rebellion, an anarchist-inspired movement of peasants and industrial workers, supported by armed militias, took control of Barcelona and of large areas of rural Spain, where they collectivized the land. However, even before the fascist victory in 1939, the anarchists were losing ground in a bitter struggle with the Stalinists, who controlled the distribution of military aid from the Soviet Union to the Republican cause. The events known as the "Spanish Revolution" was a workers' social revolution that began during the outbreak of the Spanish Civil War in 1936 and resulted in the widespread implementation of anarchist and, more broadly, libertarian socialist organizational principles throughout various portions of the country for two to three years, primarily in Catalonia, Aragon, Andalusia, and parts of the Levante. Much of Spain's economy was put under worker control; in anarchist strongholds like Catalonia, the figure was as high as 75%, but lower in areas with heavy Communist Party of Spain influence, as the Soviet-allied party actively resisted attempts at collectivization-enactment. Factories were run through worker committees, and agrarian areas became collectivized and ran as libertarian communes.

Anarchist Gaston Leval estimated that about eight million people participated directly or at least indirectly in the Spanish Revolution, which historian Sam Dolgoff claimed was the closest any revolution had come to realizing a free, stateless mass society. Stalinist-led troops suppressed the collectives and persecuted both dissident Marxists and anarchists.

=== Post-war years ===
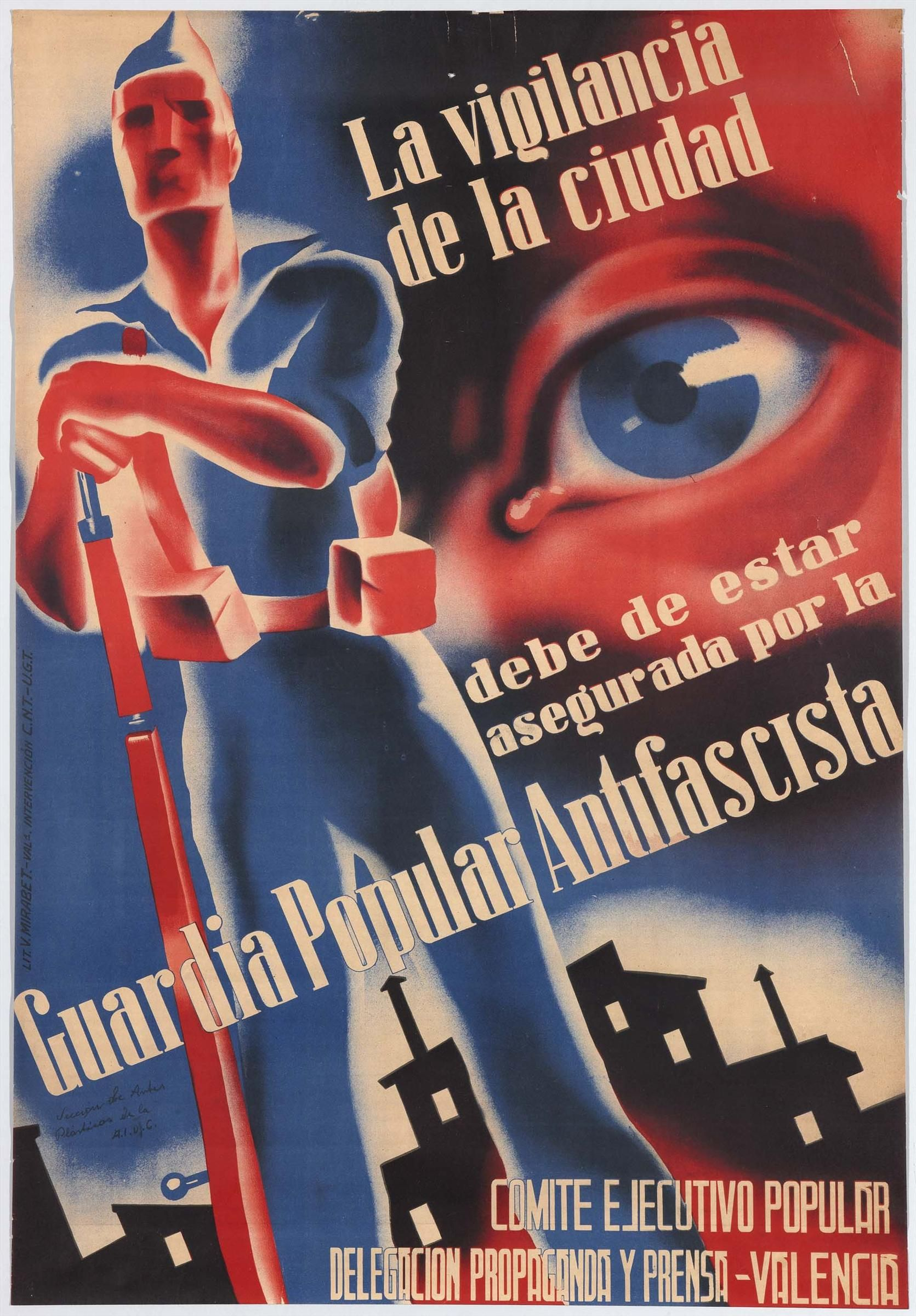
An anti-fascist poster from the libertarian socialist factions of Madrid, reading "The surveillance of the city must be ensured by the Antifascist Popular Guard" as a warning against Nationalist terrorism

Anarcho-communism entered into internal debates over the organization issue in the post-World War II era. Founded in October 1935, the Anarcho-Communist Federation of Argentina (FACA, Federación Anarco-Comunista Argentina) in 1955 renamed itself the Argentine Libertarian Federation. The Fédération Anarchiste (FA), founded in Paris on 2 December 1945, elected the platformist anarcho-communist George Fontenis as its first secretary the following year. It was composed of a majority of activists from the former FA (which supported Volin's Synthesis) and some members of the former Union Anarchiste (which supported the CNT-FAI support to the Republican government during the Spanish Civil War), as well as some young Resistants. In 1950 a clandestine group formed within the FA called Organisation Pensée Bataille (OPB), led by George Fontenis.

The new decision-making process was founded on unanimity: each person has a right of veto on the orientations of the federation. The FCL published the same year Manifeste du communisme libertaire. Several groups quit the FCL in December 1955, disagreeing with the decision to present "revolutionary candidates" to the legislative elections. On 15–20 August 1954, the Ve intercontinental plenum of the CNT took place. A group called Entente anarchiste appeared, which was formed of militants who did not like the new ideological orientation that the OPB was giving the FCL seeing it was authoritarian and almost Marxist. The FCL lasted until 1956, just after participating in state legislative elections with ten candidates. This move alienated some members of the FCL and thus produced the end of the organization. A group of militants who disagreed with the FA turning into FCL reorganized a new Federation Anarchiste established in December 1953. This included those who formed L'Entente anarchiste, who joined the new FA and then dissolved L'Entente. The new base principles of the FA were written by the individualist anarchist Charles-Auguste Bontemps and the non-platformist anarcho-communist Maurice Joyeux which established an organization with a plurality of tendencies and autonomy of groups organized around synthesist principles. According to historian Cédric Guérin, the new Federation Anarchiste identity included the unconditional rejection of Marxism, motivated in significant part by the previous conflict with George Fontenis and his OPB. In the 1970s, the French Fédération Anarchiste evolved into a joining of the principles of anarchist synthesis and platformism.

== Philosophical debates ==
=== Motivation ===
Anarchist communists reject the belief that "wage labour is necessary because people are selfish by human nature." Most would point to examples of humans being willing to sacrifice time or resources for others and believe that systems of wage labor and state taxation serve more to restrict that instinct to help others rather than ensuring a society continues to function. Anarcho-communists generally do not agree with the belief in a pre-set "human nature", arguing that human culture and behavior are primarily determined by socialization and the mode of production. Many anarchist communists, like Peter Kropotkin, also believe that the human evolutionary tendency is for humans to cooperate for mutual benefit and survival instead of existing as lone competitors, a position that Kropotkin argued for at length.

While anarchist communists such as Peter Kropotkin and Murray Bookchin believed that the members of such a society would voluntarily perform all necessary labour because they would recognize the benefits of communal enterprise and mutual aid, other anarchist communists such as Nestor Makhno and Ricardo Flores Magón argue that all those able to work in an anarchist communist society should be obligated to do so, excepting groups like children, the elderly, the sick, or the infirm. Kropotkin did not think laziness or sabotage would be a significant problem in an authentically anarchist-communist society. However, he did agree that a freely associated anarchist commune could, and probably should, deliberately disassociate from those not fulfilling their communal agreement to do their share of work. Peter Gelderloos, based on the Kibbutz, argues that motivation in a moneyless society would be found in the satisfaction of work, concern for the community, competition for prestige, and praise from other community members. However, he does acknowledge the potential need for social coercion, and in fact uses it to defend against many common critiques of potential anarchist societies.

=== Freedom, work, and leisure ===
Anarchist communists believe communism can be used to achieve the greatest freedom and well-being for everyone, rather than only the wealthy and powerful.

Kropotkin said that the main authoritarian mistakes in communist experiments of the past were their being based on "religious enthusiasm" and the desire to live "as a family" where the individual had to "submit to the dictates of a punctilious morality". For him, anarcho-communism should be based on the right of free association and disassociation for individuals and groups and on significantly lowering the number of hours each individual dedicates to necessary labor. He says that "to recognise a variety of occupations as the basis of all progress and to organise in such a way that man may be absolutely free during his leisure time, whilst he may also vary his work, a change for which his early education and instruction will have prepared him—this can easily be put in practice in a Communist society—this, again, means the emancipation of the individual, who will find doors open in every direction for his complete development".

=== Individualism and collectivism ===
Peter Kropotkin argued that individuals sacrificing themselves for the "greater", or being ruled by the "community" or "society", is not possible because society is composed of individuals rather than being a cohesive unit separate from the individual and argue that collective control over the individual is tyrannical and antithetical to anarchism. Others such as Lucien van der Walt and Michael Schmidt argue that "[t]he anarchists did not [...] identify freedom with the right of everybody to do exactly what one pleased but with a social order in which collective effort and responsibilities—that is to say, obligations—would provide the material basis and social nexus in which individual freedom could exist." They argued that "genuine freedom and individuality could only exist in a free society" and that in contrast to "misanthropic bourgeois individualism" anarchism was based in "a deep love of freedom, understood as a social product, a deep respect for human rights, a profound celebration of humankind and its potential and a commitment to a form of society where a 'true individuality' was irrevocably linked to 'the highest communist sociability'".

=== Property ===
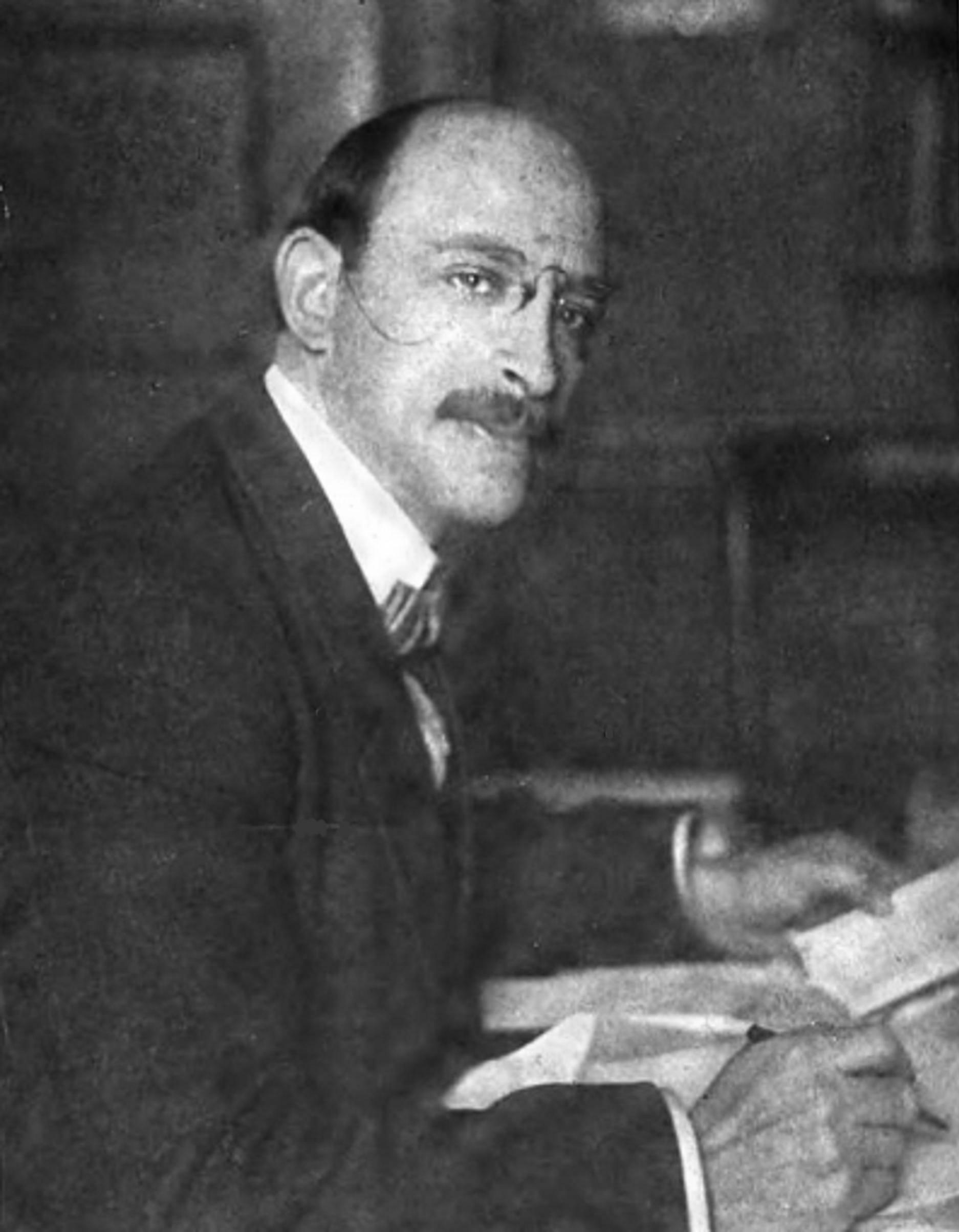
Alexander Berkman advocated for profit to be replaced with communities of common property, where all group members shared possessions

Anarchist communists counter the capitalist conception that communal property can only be maintained by force and that such a position is neither fixed in nature nor unchangeable in practice, citing numerous examples of communal behavior occurring naturally, even within capitalist systems. Anarchist communists call for the abolition of private property while maintaining respect for personal property. As such, the prominent anarcho-communist Alexander Berkman maintained that "The revolution abolishes private ownership of the means of production and distribution, and with it goes capitalistic business. Personal possession remains only in the things you use. Thus, your watch is your own, but the watch factory belongs to the people. Land, machinery, and all other public utilities will be collective property, neither to be bought nor sold. Actual use will be considered the only title-not to ownership but to possession. The organization of the coal miners, for example, will be in charge of the coal mines, not as owners but as the operating agency. Similarly will the railroad brotherhoods run the railroads, and so on. Collective possession, cooperatively managed in the interests of the community, will take the place of personal ownership privately conducted for profit."

=== Free association of communes as opposed to the nation-state ===
Anarcho-communism calls for a decentralized federalist structure in relationships of mutual aid and free association between communes and workers' councils, federated into a broader council system as an alternative to the centralism of the nation-state. Peter Kropotkin thus suggested:

Representative government has accomplished its historical mission; it has given a mortal blow to court-rule; and by its debates it has awakened public interest in public questions. But to see in it the government of the future socialist society is to commit a gross error. Each economic phase of life implies its own political phase; and it is impossible to touch the very basis of the present economic life—private property—without a corresponding change in the very basis of the political organization. Life already shows in which direction the change will be made. Not in increasing the powers of the State, but in resorting to free organization and free federation in all those branches which are now considered as attributes of the State.

— Peter Kropotkin, Anarchist Communism: Its Basis and Principles

=== Patriotism ===
Rob Sparrow outlined four main reasons why anarcho-communists oppose patriotism:

- The belief in equality for all people
- The use of patriotism to subjugate the working class
- The association between patriotism and militarism
- The use of patriotism to encourage loyalty to the state

== See also ==
- Anarcho-communists (category)
- Communization
- Council communism
- Gift economy
- Libertarian Communism
- Libertarian Marxism
- Neozapatismo
- Outline of libertarianism
- Refusal of work
- Social anarchism
- Workers' council

== Bibliography ==
- Avrich, Paul (1971) [1967]. The Russian Anarchists. Princeton: Princeton University Press. ISBN 0691007667. OCLC 1154930946.
- Berkman, Alexander (1972) [1929]. What is Communist Anarchism?. New York: Dover Publications. ISBN 0486228398. LCCN 79-188813. OCLC 573111.
- Chattopadhyay, Paresh (2018). "Anarchist Communism". Socialism and Commodity Production. Leiden: Brill. pp. 169–185. doi:10.1163/9789004377516_008. ISBN 978-9004377516.
- Dolgoff, Sam (1974). The Anarchist Collectives: Workers' Self-Management in the Spanish Revolution. Free Life Editions. ISBN 0914156039. LCCN 73-88239.
- Esenwein, George Richard (1989). Anarchist Ideology and the Working-class Movement in Spain, 1868–1898. University of California Press. ISBN 978-0520063983.
- Garner, Jason (2008). "La búsqueda de la unidad anarquista: la Federación Anarquista Ibérica antes de la II República". Germinal. Revista de Estudios Libertarios (in Spanish). No. 6. Archived from the original on 31 October 2012.
- Graham, Robert (2019). "Anarchism and the First International". In Adams, Matthew S.; Levy, Carl (eds.). The Palgrave Handbook of Anarchism. London: Palgrave Macmillan. pp. 325–342. doi:10.1007/978-3-319-75620-2_19. ISBN 978-3319756196. S2CID 158605651.
- Guérin, Cédric (2000). "Pensée et action des anarchistes en France : 1950–1970" (PDF) (in French). University of Lille III. Archived from the original (PDF) on 30 September 2007.
- Kropotkin, Peter (1901). "Communism and Anarchy". The Anarchist Library. Archived from the original on 2 July 2023.
- McKinley, C. Alexander (2019). "The French Revolution and 1848". In Levy, Carl; Adams, Matthew S. (eds.). The Palgrave Handbook of Anarchism. Cham: Springer Publishing. pp. 307–324. doi:10.1007/978-3-319-75620-2_18. ISBN 978-3-319-75620-2. OCLC 7704845112. S2CID 158876153.
- Marshall, Peter H. (2008) [1992]. Demanding the Impossible: A History of Anarchism. London: Harper Perennial. ISBN 978-0006862451. OCLC 218212571.
- Nettlau, Max (1996). A Short History of Anarchism. Freedom Press. ISBN 978-0900384899.
- Pengam, Alain (1987). "Anarcho-Communism". In Ribel, Maximilien; Crump, John (eds.). Non-Market Socialism in the Nineteenth and Twentieth Centuries. Palgrave Macmillan. pp. 60–82. doi:10.1007/978-1-349-18775-1_4. ISBN 978-1349187751.
- Pernicone, Nunzio (1993). Italian Anarchism, 1864–1892. Princeton University Press. ISBN 0691056927. LCCN 92-46661.
- Turcato, Davide (2019). "Anarchist Communism". In Adams, Matthew S.; Levy, Carl (eds.). The Palgrave Handbook of Anarchism. London: Palgrave Macmillan. pp. 237–248. doi:10.1007/978-3-319-75620-2_13. ISBN 978-3319756196. S2CID 242094330.
- Wilbur, Shawn P. (2019). "Mutualism". In Adams, Matthew S.; Levy, Carl (eds.). The Palgrave Handbook of Anarchism. London: Palgrave Macmillan. pp. 213–224. doi:10.1007/978-3-319-75620-2_11. ISBN 978-3319756196. S2CID 242074567.
