= Los Angeles Garment Workers strike of 1933 =

Influential American labor action

Los Angeles Garment Workers Strike of 1933
- Date: October 12, 1933
- Location: Los Angeles
- Methods: Strikes, Demonstrations
- Result: Collective bargaining agreement

Parties
International Ladies Garment Workers Union;

Lead figures
Rose Pesotta, Anita Andrade Castro	

Casualties and losses
- Deaths: Injuries: Arrests: Deaths: Injuries:

The Los Angeles Garment Workers strike of 1933 is considered to be one of the most influential strikes in Los Angeles after the passing of the New Deal. The strike is known for being one of the first strikes where Mexican immigrant workers played a prominent role. The garment workers strike occurred in the fall of 1933 in the downtown Garment District in Los Angeles, California. Leaders of the strike, including Rose Pesotta and other members of the International Ladies Garment Workers Union (ILGWU), organized the strike to be culturally orientated in order to include Mexican immigrant workers to fight for union recognition in the garment industry.

== Garment industry in Los Angeles ==
The ladies garment industry in Los Angeles was one of the most rapidly growing industries. By 1933 the garment industry was worth $3 million (~$57.6 million in 2024).^{:149} When the Great Crash of 1929-1933 struck the country, the garment industry in Los Angeles was least affected. During the period of the Great Crash, the garment industry had a high demand for female occupations as opposed to male occupations. As a result, minority women were forced to seek jobs in order to sustain their families. Mexican immigrant women became the primary source for cheap labor in the garment industry. By classifying them as unskilled labor, employers were able to pay them less, allowing for Mexican women to take up 75% of the clothing and needle trades in Los Angeles.^{:148}

By 1933 President Franklin D. Roosevelt established the New Deal program in order to reconstruct the nations economy by creating opportunities for the working class. The New Deal program included the National Industrial Recovery Act (NIRA), where section 7A enforced living wages, the right to bargain collectively, organized independent unions and banding employer unions.

In the garment industry employers refused to recognize the act and continued using the Open Shop policy. The act helped strengthen unions, which paved the way for a "labor movement in Los Angeles to quell the power of the open shop lobby,"^{:132} resulting in a wave of strikes throughout Los Angeles in 1933.

== International Ladies Garment Workers Union ==
In Los Angeles the ILGWU was under the authority of white and Jewish union leaders from the East Coast who only supported white garment workers in cloak and suits industries. Often ignoring the inexperienced Mexican workers in the dress industries who also desired for better working conditions and wage increase. Union leaders argued that their reason for ignoring them was because "Latinas could never be organized."^{:153}

In 1933 Rose Pesotta was sent from the New York City headquarters of the ILGWU to help organize Mexican garment workers. Rose described these women as having the potential to be the "backbone of our union in the West coast" increasing the membership of the ILGWU.^{:153}

Rose Pesotta along with other members of the ILGWU such as labor leader, Anita Andrade Castro helped organized Mexican women by raising a consciousness of the benefits of unionism. The way she raised a consciousness was through visiting workers homes, having Spanish speakers, and establishing the KELW, a Spanish broadcasting station.^{134} All these efforts by Pesotta helped inform and train these women who had not experienced unionism before.

== The garment workers strike of 1933 ==
By the fall of 1933 the garment workers strike was initiated when employers refused to comply with the demands of Mexican garment workers. Their demands included union recognition, 35 hours a week, minimum wage; eliminate homework, and safer working conditions.

The strike began in October 12 and lasted for 26 days. The strikers passed out bilingual leaflets to encourage coworkers to join the strike. The first day 3,011 workers picketed in front of dress factories in the Garment District of downtown.^{:156} Other strikers marched into state and local offices to press their demands.

In many instances the strike became violent when strikers would verbally and physically assault their coworkers who did not join the strike. The strikers would throw tomatoes to those who did not participate. Due to the violence the Los Angeles Police Department got involved and tried to put the strike into a halt by arresting 50 of the strikers.^{:157}The women who got arrested were charged for unlawful picketing and battery assault. The police claimed that they were protecting the workers, but in reality the "Red Squad" was trying to end the strike.

For those who took part of the strike the ILGWU and some community members helped their economic hardships by donating groceries to striker's families. The ILGWU also gave strikers benefit cards that allowed strikers to borrow money for rent.^{:157}

By November 6, 1933 the strike was off and employees returned to work. Garment workers were able attain a minimum wage and 35 hours a week works pay. They were also able to establish a Dressmakers Union Local 96 with a membership of 2,646.^{:158}

== See also ==
- Bibliography of Los Angeles
- Outline of the history of Los Angeles
- Bibliography of California history
