= Vanguard (journal) =

Monthly anarchist journal of the 1930s

- Type: Monthly journal
- Format: Broadsheet
- Owner: Vanguard Group
- Editor: Sam Weiner (Sam Dolgoff)
- Founded: 1932
- Ceased publication: July 1939
- Headquarters: New York City

Vanguard: A Libertarian Communist Journal was a monthly anarchist political and theoretical journal, based in New York City, published between April 1932 and July 1939, and edited by Samuel Weiner, among others.

Vanguard began as a project of the Vanguard Group, composed of members of the editorial collective of the Road to Freedom newspaper, as well as members of the Friends of Freedom group. Its initial subtitle was "An Anarchist Youth Publication", but changed to "A Libertarian Communist Journal " after issue 1.

Within several issues Vanguard would become a central sounding board for the international anarchist movement, including reports of developments during the Spanish Revolution as well as movement reports by Augustin Souchy and Emma Goldman.

== Contributors ==
The following is a partial list of contributors whose essays were published in Vanguard:

- "Samuel Weiner" (Sam Dolgoff)
- S Morrison
- Senex
- Abe Coleman
- Roman Weinrebe
