= Rose Pesotta =

American trade unionist (1896–1965)

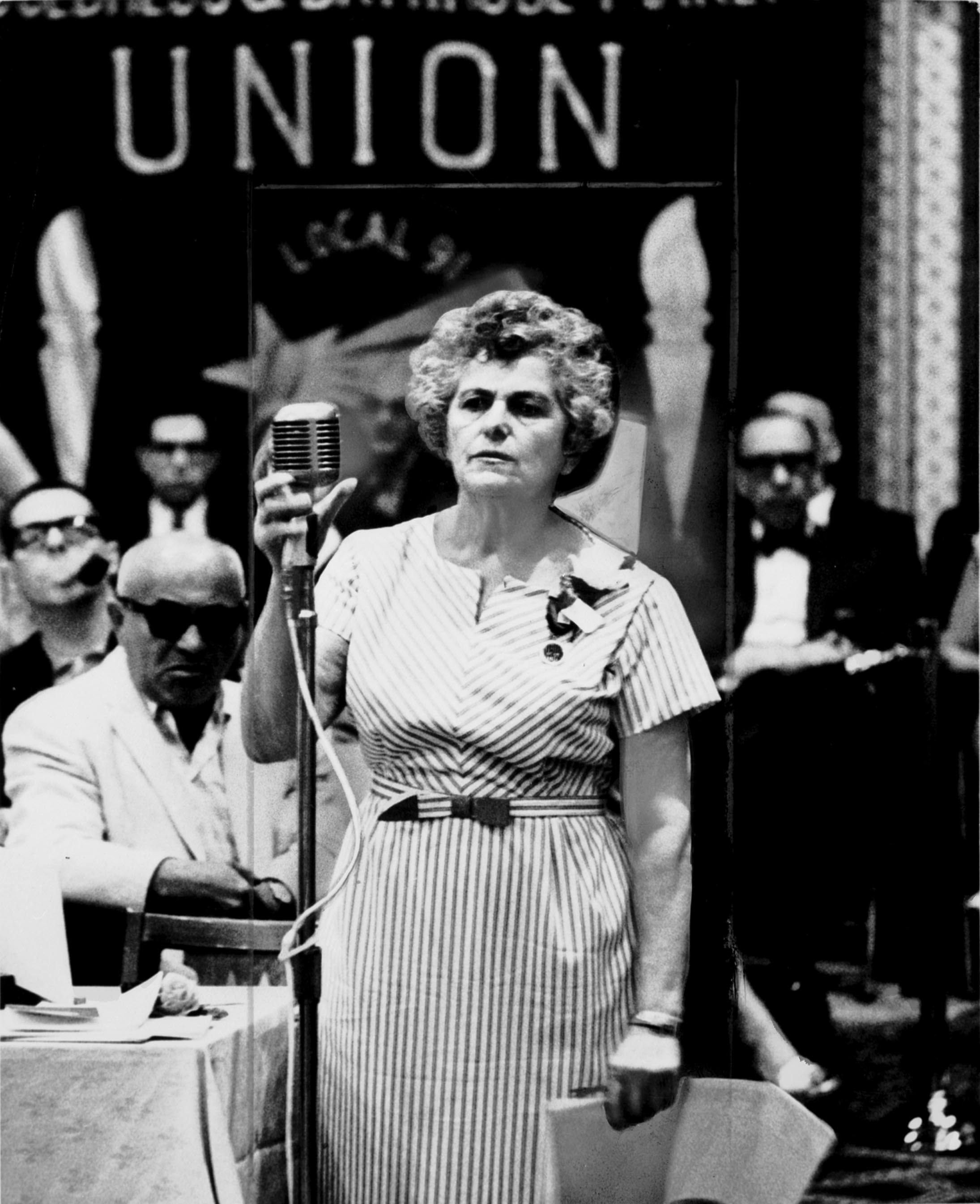
- Pesotta addresses the floor at the 1965 ILGWU convention

Rose Pesotta (1896–1965) was an anarchist, feminist labor organizer and vice president within the International Ladies' Garment Workers' Union.

== Background ==
Pesotta was born Rakhel Peisoty in Derazhnia, Ukraine on Nov. 20, 1896, to a family of Jewish grain merchants. She was the second of the six daughters and eight children of her parents, Itsaak and Masya Peisoty. Pesotta was educated in both formal and informal settings during her childhood. She was exposed to the works of anarchists like Bakunin through both her father's library and in a local anarchist underground, and she would eventually adopt anarchist views.

Her parents arranged a marriage for her, but she did not approve, so in 1913 she emigrated to New York City and became a seamstress in a shirtwaist factory.

== Career ==
=== ILGWU ===
In 1914, Pesotta joined ILGWU Local 25, which (influenced by the 1909 shirtwaist strike) was led by women and was heavily involved in activism and education of seamstresses. On behalf of the local, she researched the Sacco and Vanzetti case, becoming a friend of Bartolomeo Vanzetti.

Pesotta regularly wrote for union and anarchist publications in Yiddish and English. Along with Anna Sosnovsky, Fanny Breslaw and Clara Rothberg Larsen, she published Der Yunyon Arbeter ("The Union Worker") between 1923 and 1927. From 1924 to 1928, Pesotta also contributed occasional articles to the anarchist newspaper Road to Freedom (the successor to Emma Goldman's Mother Earth).

Pesotta also regularly sought training, attending summer schools at Bryn Mawr and Wisconsin in 1922 and 1930, and attending Brookwood Labor College, a school to train labor activists, from 1924–26.

Beginning in the 1930s, Pesotta became a member of the ILGWU staff and regularly traveled to organize workers outside of New York. For example, in 1933, the ILGWU sent her to Los Angeles to organize garment workers. She organized the primarily Mexican immigrant garment workers, which led to the Los Angeles Garment Workers Strike of 1933. Strikes were a rarity in this notoriously "open shop" city, and so her success in Los Angeles led to her appointment as vice-president of the union in 1934 (only the third woman to be so chosen, following Fannia Cohn). In Montreal in 1937, her efforts included work to transform the nascent movement from one focused on Jewish seamstresses to one that was also inclusive of French-speaking women. As a result, Catholic media suggested she be deported. She also worked in organizing efforts in Puerto Rico (1934), Akron, Milwaukee, and elsewhere.

=== Resignation ===
After working extensively with the Los Angeles Local 484 while they were being organized, Pesotta sought to manage the local. Instead, ILGWU president David Dubinsky rejected her request. In response, Pesotta resigned from the union's staff and board. Her resignation letter specifically blamed sexism as the cause for her resignation, stating that the "men to whom I have been so useful" did not seem "to recognize the fact that I was competent" to manage locals.

In 1944, Pesotta refused a new term on the executive board of the union, specifically stating that she could not be the only woman on the board when 85% of the union's membership were women.

=== Later life ===
After leaving the union, Pesotta worked briefly for the B'nai B'rith. However, she returned to work as a seamstress in roughly a year. She also wrote and published two memoirs, Bread Upon the Waters (1944), and Days of Our Lives (1958).

== Death ==
Pesotta died of cancer in Miami, Florida on Dec. 6, 1965.
