= Sam Dolgoff =

American anarcho-syndicalist (1902–1990)

- Portrait of Sam (right) and Esther Dolgoff, c. 1980
- Born: October 10, 1902; Ostrovno, Vitebsky Uyezd, Russian Empire
- Died: October 15, 1990 (aged 88); New York City, U.S.
- Occupations: Painter, syndicalist
- Organization: IWW

Sam Dolgoff (10 October 1902 – 15 October 1990) was a Russian-born American painter and anarcho-syndicalist.

== Biography ==
Dolgoff was born in the shtetl of Ostrovno in Mogilev Governorate, Russian Empire (in present-day Beshankovichy Raion, Belarus), moving as a child to New York City in 1905 or 1906, where he lived in the Bronx and in Manhattan's Lower East Side where he died. His father was a house painter, and Dolgoff began house painting at the age of 11, a profession he remained in his entire life.

After being expelled from the Young People's Socialist League, Sam joined the Industrial Workers of the World in 1922 and remained an active member his entire life, playing an active role in the anarchist movement for much of the century. He was a co-founder of the Libertarian Labor Review magazine, which was later renamed Anarcho-Syndicalist Review to avoid confusion with America's Libertarian Party.

Dolgoff was a member of the Chicago Free Society Group in the 1920s, Vanguard Group member and editor of its publication Vanguard: A Journal of Libertarian Communism in the 1930s, and co-founded the Libertarian League in New York in 1954. He wrote articles for anarchist magazines as well as books as the editor of anthologies, some of which are listed below. He was active in many causes, and attended groups like New York's Libertarian Book Club regularly.

Dogloff died of congestive heart failure at the age of 88 in 1990.

== Selected bibliography ==
- Ethics and American Unionism (1958)
- The Labor Party Illusion (1961)
- Bakunin on Anarchy (1971; revised 1980)
- The Anarchist Collectives: Workers' Self-Management in the Spanish Revolution, 1936–1939 (1974)
- The Cuban Revolution: A Critical Perspective (1974)
- "American Labor Movement: Rebellion in the Ranks" Interrogations No. 3, 1975.
- The Relevance of Anarchism to Modern Society (1977)
- A Critique of Marxism (1983)
- "Modern Technology and Anarchism" (1986)
- Fragments: A Memoir (1986, ISBN 0-946222-04-5).
- Third World Nationalism and the State (Anarchist Communist Federation of North America) (1983)

== See also ==
- Anarchism in the United States

== Sources ==
- Avrich, Paul (2005). Anarchist Voices: An Oral History of Anarchism in America. AK Press. ISBN 978-1904859277.
- Cornell, Andrew (2016). Unruly Equality: U.S. Anarchism in the Twentieth Century. Oakland: University of California Press. ISBN 978-0-520-28675-7.
- Dolgoff, Anatole (2016). Left of the Left: My Memories of Sam Dolgoff. Chico, CA: AK Press. ISBN 9781849352482. OCLC 923553775.
  - "Review: Left of the Left: My Memories of Sam Dolgoff By Anatole..." Rebel Worker. Vol. 35, no. 3. Australia: Anarcho-Syndicalist Network. 3 January 2018. pp. 16–17. (PDF)
  - Sucher, Joel. "Left of the Left: My Memories of Sam Dolgoff (A Book Review)". HuffPost.
  - Conatz, Juan (19 July 2016). "A review of Left of the left: my memories of Sam Dolgoff by Anatole Dolgoff". libcom.org.
  - "Left of the Left: my memories of Sam Dolgoff [Book review]". Kate Sharpley Library Bulletin (90). 2017. ISSN 1475-0309.
  - Gerould, Frank (11 July 2016). "Fellow Worker Sam Dolgoff (1902-1990)". Socialism Reaffirmed.
  - Clark, John (22 January 2017). "Sam Dolgoff: A Life at the center of American anarchism for seventy years". Fifth Estate Magazine. No. 397.
  - Dirnbach, Eric (February 28, 2017). "Facing the wind: the life of Wobbly organizer Sam Dolgoff". Roar.
  - Cole, Peter (2016). "Left of the Left: My Memories of Sam Dolgoff Review". Anarcho-Syndicalist Review. Vol. 68.
  - Cashbaugh, Sean (February 2017). "Review of Dolgoff, Anatole, Left of the Left: My Memories of Sam Dolgoff". H-Net.
  - Radosh, Allis (16 June 2018). "Free Radicals". Jewish Review of Books. pp. 22–24. (PDF)
- Kayton, Bruce (2003), Radical Walking Tours of New York City, Seven Stories Press, ISBN 1-58322-554-4
- Porton, Richard (1999), Film and the Anarchist Imagination, Verso Books, ISBN 1-85984-702-1
