= Anarchist Voices =

1995 oral history book of 53 interviews by Paul Avrich

- First edition
- Author: Paul Avrich
- Subject: American history, anarchism, oral history
- Published: 1995 (Princeton University Press)
- Pages: 574
- ISBN: 978-0-691-03412-6
- OCLC: 466742103

Anarchist Voices: An Oral History of Anarchism in America is a 1995 oral history book of 180 interviews with anarchists over 30 years by Paul Avrich. An abridged edition was published with 53 interviews.

== Contents ==
In Anarchist Voices, Paul Avrich records the 180 interviews he has catalogued over 30 years with anarchists and former anarchists to preserve their perspectives. The book is divided into six sections with interviews covering the main subject of each section.

"Pioneers," elaborates on the experiences of the first American anarchists, establishes the major forms of anarchism at the time, and outlines the common belief held by most anarchists. "Emma Goldman" brings to light information on anarchist Emma Goldman from interviewees that knew her. The interviewees discuss their thoughts on her, positive or negative, about her personal side rather than political side. The section, "Nicola Sacco and Bartolomeo Vanzetti," contains interviews about the two anarchists and their lives before they were arrested and executed. "Schools and Colonies" contains interviews of the life experiences from those that participated in anarchist schools and colonies. The interviews explore the effectiveness of curricula aiming to produce educated students and adult anarchists. Additionally, the section discusses the problems anarchist colonies would face. In "Ethnic Anarchists," Avrich noted the differences he observed in the anarchist ethnic groups and the interviewees would discuss the communities built around their cultural traditions. "The 1920s and After," discusses the changed importance and appeal of anarchism after the 1920s and why the fall in relevance occurred.

The final contents of the book include an index and footnotes providing context on important people, places, things or ideas the interviews did not explain.
