= Gaston Leval =

French anarchist (1895–1978)

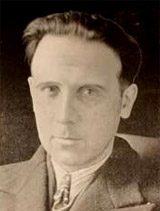
- Born: Pierre Robert Piller; 20 October 1895; Saint-Denis, Paris, France
- Died: 8 April 1978 (aged 82); Saint-Cloud, Paris, France
- Movement: Anarcho-syndicalism

Gaston Leval (20 October 1895 – 8 April 1978) was a French anarcho-syndicalist, combatant and historian of the Spanish Revolution.

== Biography ==
Leval was born in 1895, by the name Pierre Piller in Saint-Denis, the son of a French Communard. During World War I, he fled France to Spain, in order to avoid conscription. There he joined the local anarcho-syndicalist trade union, the Confederación Nacional del Trabajo (CNT). In 1921, Leval traveled to Moscow to attend the 3rd World Congress of the Communist International, together with the CNT's Spanish delegation. When he returned from the Congress, he argued that the Bolsheviks had transformed the "dictatorship of the proletariat" into a "dictatorship over the proletariat". The rise of the dictatorship of Primo de Rivera forced him to leave Spain for Argentina, where he would live until 1936.

Following the outbreak of the Spanish Civil War, he returned to Spain and joined the confederal militias. He was deployed to the Aragon front, where he fought in the sectors of Zaragoza and Huesca. In November 1936, he was sent to Málaga, where he was put on the war committee. There he reported strong local support for the CNT-FAI and popular distrust with the Spanish Republican government, which he claimed to have "systematically sabotaged" the war effort by failing to provide the city with weapons or ammunition.

Leval then returned to Aragon, where he lived among the local agrarian collectives and reported on their activities. He wrote that labour was done collectively and agricultural produce was held under common ownership, with all inhabitants of the collective deciding on its distribution for consumption or for exchange. He described the Aragonese collectives as the first mass experiment in the distribution of resources "from each according to their ability, to each according to their needs", with some villages using a local currency, while others had abolished money entirely. He likewise outlined the reorganisation of the industrial economy along the lines of anarcho-syndicalism, in which different industrial sectors were federated together under one administration. Leval claimed that, in total, 75% of smallholdings in Aragon had been voluntarily collectivised. In the summer of 1937, he reported on the forced dissolution of the collectives by the Republican authorities. He reported to Le Libertaire that "low politics" had been the main cause of the Republican military defeats.

He decided to leave Spain and returned to France, where he was arrested for his desertion during World War I and sentenced to four years in prison. By the outbreak of the May 1968 events in France, Leval claimed that the anarchist movement had reached a historic low point in both its numbers and theoretical developments. Leval died in 1978.

== Selected works ==
- Gaston Leval, "Anarchists Behind Bars", Summer 1921
- Gaston Leval, "Collectives in Aragon", London, 1938
- Gaston Leval, "Social Reconstruction in Spain: Spain and the World", London, 1938
- Gaston Leval, "Collectives in Spain", Freedom Press, London, 1945
- Gaston Leval, "Ne Franco Ne Stalin", Milan, 1952
- Gaston Leval, "Collectives in the Spanish Revolution", Freedom Press, London, 1975 (originally in French, "Espagne Libertaire (1936 - 1939)", Editions du Cercle, 1971)
- Gaston Leval, "El Estado en la historia", 1978

== Bibliography ==
- Berry, David (December 1989). "French Anarchists in Spain, 1936–1939". French History. 3 (4): 427–441. doi:10.1093/fh/3.4.427. ISSN 0269-1191.
- Berry, David (2019). "Anarchism and 1968". In Adams, Matthew S.; Levy, Carl (eds.). The Palgrave Handbook of Anarchism. London: Palgrave Macmillan. pp. 449–470. doi:10.1007/978-3-319-75620-2_26. ISBN 978-3319756196. S2CID 158605651.
- Marshall, Peter H. (1993). Demanding the Impossible: A History of Anarchism. London: Fontana Press. ISBN 978-0-00-686245-1. OCLC 1042028128.
- Nappalos, Scott (2012). "Ditching Class: The Praxis of Anarchist Communist Economics". In Shannon, Deric; Nocella II, Anthony; Asimakopoulos, John (eds.). The Accumulation of Freedom. Oakland, Edinburgh, Baltimore: AK Press. pp. 291–312. ISBN 978-1849350945. LCCN 2011936250.
- Spannos, Chris (2012). "Examining the History of Anarchist Economics to See the Future". In Shannon, Deric; Nocella II, Anthony; Asimakopoulos, John (eds.). The Accumulation of Freedom. Oakland, Edinburgh, Baltimore: AK Press. pp. 42–63. ISBN 978-1849350945. LCCN 2011936250.
