= Road to Freedom (journal) =

Anarchist political journal (1924–1932)

Road to Freedom was a monthly anarchist political journal published by Hippolyte Havel.

It existed between 1924 and May 1932. The founder was the Francisco Ferrer Association. The journal was first published in Stelton, New Jersey, and then in New York City. Its contributors included Rose Pesotta, Joseph Spivak, Hippolyte Havel and S Van Valkenburgh. Until February 1929 Hippolyte Havel edited the magazine.

== See also ==
- List of anarchist periodicals
