= Unruly Equality =

2016 book by Andrew Cornell

- Author: Andrew Cornell
- Subject: Anarchism in the United States
- Publisher: University of California Press
- Publication date: January 2016
- Pages: 416
- ISBN: 9780520286757

Unruly Equality: U.S. Anarchism in the Twentieth Century is a 2016 book by Andrew Cornell on post-war and contemporary anarchism in the United States.

External audio
- Interview with the author, April 2016

== Synopsis ==
Unruly Equality focuses on anarchist activity in the United States in the 1940s and 1950s, the period between anarchism's classical era (1880s–1920s) and the contemporary resurgence of anarchist currents. While American anarchism is usually portrayed as having little continuity from the beginning to the end of the 20th century, Cornell argues that anarchism in the midcentury, postwar period both bridged and influenced what would become contemporary anarchism as activism shifted from syndicalism and class struggle to critical analysis, affinity group action, and gradualism. This midcentury anarchism covers bohemian anarchism in the 1940s, which focused on personal liberty and social liberation.

== Reception ==
The Journal of American History's reviewer says that Cornell was unsuccessful in finding causal links between anarchism and the major, midcentury social movements—the civil rights movement, the New Left, and opposition to United States involvement in the Vietnam War—owing partly to not analyzing anarchism in context of its influence on the larger American Left and labor movements. Cornell is clearer in his connections between anarchism and 20th century subcultures like punk and hippies.
