= Free-market roads =

Concept promoting private roads

Free-market roads is the idea that it is possible and desirable for a society to have entirely private roads.

Free-market roads and infrastructure are generally advocated by anarcho-capitalist works, including Murray Rothbard's For a New Liberty, Morris and Linda Tannehill's The Market for Liberty, David D. Friedman's The Machinery of Freedom, and David T. Beito's The Voluntary City.

== Arguments for free market roads ==
=== "Private roads can have no free riders, reducing congestion" ===
The free rider problem has been cited by proponents such as Murray Rothbard as a reason for privatizing roads: since traffic congestion is the result of excess demand for transportation infrastructure, it may be treated as any other economic shortage - in this case, a shortage of roads, lanes, exits, or other infrastructure. Seeing the pricing mechanism of a free market as a more efficient means of meeting demand than government planning (see Economic calculation problem), Peter Samuel, in his book Highway Aggravation: The Case for Privatizing the Highways, compares American traffic jams and Soviet grocery store lines:

"In Russia communism's failure was epitomized by constant shortages in stores. Empty shelves in supermarkets and department stores and customers in line, wasting hours each week, became the face of the system's failure, as well as a source of huge personal frustration, even rage. Communism failed because prices were not flexible to match supply and demand; because stores were bureaucracies, not businesses; and because revenues went into a central treasury and did not fuel increased capacity and improved service. We in supposedly capitalistic America suffer communism--an unpriced service provided by an unresponsive monopolistic bureaucracy--on most of our highways. Our manifestation of shortage, our equivalent of Russian lines at stores, is daily highway backups. There is no price on rush-hour travel to clear the market. There is no revenue stream directly from road users to road managers to provide incentives either to manage existing capacity to maximum consumer advantage or to adjust capacity to demand."

Insufficient competition between private roads could however lead to oligopoly or even monopoly pricing, which leads to higher tolls and lower construction capacities. This results in higher costs for consumers but no reduction in congestion.

=== "Privatization will encourage better infrastructure management" ===
B. H. Meyer stated, "It is evident that the turnpike movement resulted in a very general betterment of roads." The book Street Smart claims that Brazil has saved 20 percent and Colombia 50 percent through efforts to outsource road maintenance to the private sector.

=== "Free market roads will have less crime" ===
Bruce L. Benson argues that when roads are privately owned, local residents will be better able to prevent crime by exercising their right to ask miscreants to leave. He observes that avenues in the private places of St. Louis have been shown to have lower crime rates than adjacent public streets. The Market for Liberty further argues that private roads will be better policed as the owners focus on serious crime rather than on victimless offenses:

A private corporation which owned streets would make a point of keeping its streets free of drunks, hoodlums, and any other such annoying menaces, hiring private guards to do so if necessary. It might even advertise, "Thru-Way Corporation's streets are guaranteed safe at any hour of the day or night. Women may walk alone with perfect confidence on our thoroughfares." A criminal, forbidden to use any city street because all the street corporations knew of his bad reputation, would have a hard time even getting anywhere to commit a crime. On the other hand, the private street companies would have no interest in regulating the dress, "morals," habits, or lifestyle of the people who used their streets. For instance, they wouldn't want to drive away customers by arresting or badgering hippies, girls in see-through blouses or topless bathing suits or any other non-aggressive deviation from the value standards of the majority. All they would ask is that each customer pay his dime-a-day and refrain from initiating force, obstructing traffic, and driving away other customers. Other than this, his life-style and moral code would be of no interest to them; they would treat him courteously and solicit his business.

One criticism of this argument is that it ignores possible consumer discrimination. If most people would not want to share a road with a certain group of people, it would be economically beneficial for the company to discriminate against those people.

=== "Free market roads will encourage small business" ===
Mutualist Kevin Carson argues that transportation is a natural diseconomy of scale. He says that the cost of transportation increases disproportionately with the size of a firm; he believes that in a free market, there would be strict upper limits to the size and power of corporations, and small businesses would have natural advantages. He continues by arguing that government subsidies to transportation, however, make large, centralized corporations artificially profitable, contributing to corporate dominance of the economy.

== Arguments against free market roads ==
=== "Roads are often natural monopolies" ===
In many parts of the world land use patterns mean that building two or more highways in parallel isn't practicable, thus making highways a natural monopoly. Kroeger claims, "This would result in an incredibly inefficient use of land resources." When there is only one highway connecting points A and B, the main advantage of privatization, competition, disappears. In the absence of regulation, a private highway could charge an exorbitant monopoly price, resulting in huge profit margins and few benefits for drivers. An initial franchise fee (in the case of franchised publicly owned roads) and/or savings of public capital costs, can offset the resulting monopoly profits in terms of societal costs, but there are distributional issues in that the income is spread over an entire region while the burden falls on a small subset of that region's population who actually need to use the road. Also, it is difficult to predict the long term present value of a road. For example, the 407 ETR (an express toll highway near Toronto originally built with public funds) was leased for three billion CAD and was subsequently valued at nearly ten billion CAD. While alternate local roads and other forms of transportation may provide some competition, it is often impractical, especially for goods.

A counter-argument is that while a lone highway connecting A to B may not have any other competition from other highways, it would still have to compete with trains, planes, and other roads.

=== "Transaction costs can outweigh benefits" ===
As with any transaction, there are transaction costs associated with charging for entry to roads. These include explicit costs like the building of toll booths and paying guards and other associated personnel, as well as implicit costs like wait times and mental processing costs. Especially for smaller roads these transaction costs could make privatisation undesirable, as it may be unlikely for the benefits to outweigh the possible costs.

== See also ==
- Private highway
- Private road
- Transit privatization
