= Libertarian theories of law =

Libertarian theories of law are a family of approaches that build on the classical liberal and individualist doctrines and treat the protection of individual liberty and private property as the organizing purpose of law. Their unifying promise is that the legitimate use of coercion is narrowly bounded: law exists to define and defend property rights, enforce voluntary agreements, and provide redress for aggression. The libertarian theories regard discretionary, redistributive, and regulatory activities of the modern legislative state as illegitimate or, at best, deeply suspicious.

Two features recur across libertarian theories of law. The first is a strong presumption against political authority—following the claim that the burden of justification falls on anyone who would compel another peaceful person, and not on the person wishing to be left alone. The second is a close alliance with economics, and in particular with the Austrian School, which emphasizes dispersed knowledge, spontaneous order, and coordinating role of prices and market forces. In this view, social order is understood less as something legislators design than as an emerging order, which is a by-product of secure property rights and free exchange; Adam Ferguson famously observes it as "the result of human action, but not the execution of human design." Friedrich Hayek made the phrase central to his ideas of jurisprudence.

Libertarian legal theory spans across a spectrum of institutional conclusions, On one side, minarchism holds that a "night-watchman state" confined to policing, national defence, and adjudication of disputes is just and necessary, while on the other side, anarcho-capitalism holds that even these could be actively provided by markets through private defense agencies and arbitration. An additional debate exists orthogonally to these extremes, between deontologists, who ground law in natural rights, and consequentialists, who defend libertarian legal order by its resulting efficiency following Austrian economic principles.

== Intellectual origins ==
=== John Locke ===
In the Second Treatise of Government, John Locke argues that individuals own themselves and acquire property in unowned things by "mixing their labor" with them. For Locke, the government is instituted by the consent of the governed for the limited purpose of securing life, liberty, and property.

=== Frédéric Bastiat ===
An influential early work on the libertarian view is the pamphlet The Law ("La Loi") by the French economist Frédéric Bastiat. He argues that individuals possess the rights to life, liberty, and property that exist prior to, and independent of legislation, contending that these did not come into being because laws were made, but the laws were made because they had already existed. He defined law as the "collective right of individual self defence," and held that its only legitimate purpose is to secure these rights. When a law is used to take from some and give to others, it is "legal plunder". The term legal plunder refers to acts that are done through legislation, and would be a crime if done by a private person. For example, if a legislation is used to provide, social security to some, while others pay for it, it would be legal plunder since if someone did it directly, it would be theft. Bastiat argues that when the law is turned to such ends, whether through protectionism, subsidy, or socialism, it loses moral authority and provokes social conflicts.

=== Lysander Spooner ===
The 19th century American lawyer, abolitionist, and individualist anarchist Lysander Spooner gave the tradition its most radical natural law expression. In the unconstitutionality of slavery, he argued that genuine law is discoverable principle, and not a command of the sovereign, thus enactments authorizing slavery were void.

=== Others ===
In The Principles of Ethics, Herbert Spencer has argued for the "law of equal freedom", stating, "Every man is free to do that which he wills, provided he infringes not the equal freedom of every other man." Gustave de Molinari argued in The Production of Security has argued that the protection could be provided competitively, rather that monopolistically, which later inspired several anarcho-capitalist thinkers. The methodical individualism and the theory of spontaneous emergence of institutions was developed by Carl Menger, and later by Ludwig von Mises, giving an Austrian foundation on which some of the modern libertarian theories of law rely.

== Foundational principles ==
=== The non-aggression principle ===
The principle argument made by libertarian theorists is the "non-aggression principle" (NAP): it is unjustified to initiate physical force against any person or property held by them (the basic assumption being that they have acquired it justly). Force is legitimate only in defense against, or as proportional response to, prior aggression. Explaining the principle, he writes;

"Freedom is a condition in which a person’s ownership rights in his own body and his legitimate material property are not invaded, are not aggressed against."

The NAP is best understood as a conclusion derived from the self-ownership of property rather than a free-standing axiom. Most disputes within the theoretical framework remain concerned with specifying the terminologies: what counts as aggression, what is just acquisition of property, and what could be considered proportional.

=== Self ownership and original appropriation ===
The libertarian legal theories are grounded in self-ownership, holding that each person has the exclusive right over their body. Combining it with Locke's labor theory of acquisition becomes a basis for libertarian theorists. A person owns his body and those previously unowned resources he first puts to use (homesteading), and thereafter title could be considered just acquisition if the transfer is done voluntarily. These rights are then held absolute, and any uninvited interference with another's property becomes a subject of lawful redressal.

=== Property, scarcity, and conflict ===
The Austrian economic view grounds property rights in scarcity. As rivalrous resources can be used only by one person at a time, their use is a potential source of interpersonal conflicts; rules and rights relating to property avoid such conflicts. This analysis implies that the function of property is not to use reward labour in making it useful, but in prevention and resolution of conflicts. The conflict avoidance framework is important in debates related to intellectual property.

== Justifications ==
A significant feature of libertarian theories of law is sustained attention to why laws are binding and who could enforce their violation.

=== Natural Rights ===
The deontological argument, advanced by Rothbard and Spooner, treats self-ownership and property as objective moral claims that are derived from reason, and in the absence of any legislation. The primary criticism of this approach has been that that natural law view is that it fails to address the is-ought problem.

=== Argumentation ethics ===
Hans-Hermann Hoppe sought to close the is-ought dilemma with argumentation ethics. Hoppe tried to establish an a priori and value-neutral justification for libertarian ethics arguing that anyone engaging in argumentation must presuppose their exclusive control over their own body; and the prior appropriation of scarce resources needed to sustain it. Therefore, arguing against homesteading is a performative (or practical) contradiction, since the act of arguing presupposes the very norms being denied.

=== Estoppel and the theory of punishment ===
Stephan Kinsella has developed an approach supported by Estoppel, a juridical device in common law, arguing that an aggressor cannot consistently object to proportional force used against him, since doing so would contradict the principle implicit in their own aggression.

=== Consequentialist and economic justification ===
David Friedman, in The Machinery of Freedom, has grounded justification on economic grounds—without referring to natural rights—stating that competitive private institutions would be more efficient in maintaining law and order. Other scholars have also made an institutional-economic case for customary, privately enforced legal system.

=== Other justifications ===
Hayek has defended his arguments on epistemological grounds: the rules of just conduct are valuable because they economize on the dispersed knowledge that no central body can command and deliver a just system. Randy Barnett has tried to treat natural rights as hypothetical imperatives: the rules that a society must adopt it wants to handle the pervasive problems of dispersed knowledge, vested interests, and power. Barnett has, effectively integrated Hayek's epistemological insights with concerns arising out of public-choice theory and concentration of political power.

== Law as spontaneous order ==
=== Friedrich Hayek ===
The most influential legal theory in libertarianism tradition treats law as an evolved and discovered order, rather than a designed, legislated one. Hayek's three-volume Law, Legislation and Liberty is regarded as the culmination of his legal philosophy in one of the most important texts in libertarian jurisprudence. The primary concern for Hayek is epistemological: human reason cannot comprehend, let alone design, the complex orders that emerge from centuries of interactions; he summed it up aptly in the following words in his Nobel Memorial Prize in Economic Sciences in 1974

"The recognition of the insuperable limits to his knowledge ought indeed to teach the student of society a lesson of humility which should guard him against becoming an accomplice in men’s fatal striving to control society — a striving which makes him not only a tyrant over his fellows, but which may well make him the destroyer of a civilization which no brain has designed but which has grown from the free efforts of millions of individuals."

Hayek distinguishes between two kinds of orders—cosmos, a grown or spontaneous order, and taxis, a made or constructed one—corresponding to two different kinds of rules: nomos, the evolved "law of liberty", consisting of abstract, general rules of conduct; and thesis, the deliberate "law of legislation", appropriate to internal administration of an organization, but not for a free people. The central argument for Hayek is that genuine law is discovered (usually based on facts by common law judges), rather than invented.

=== Bruno Leoni ===
Italian jurist Bruno Leoni, argued that judge-discovered law—either in common law or civil law system—provides greater long-run clarity than legislation and rules, because it changes slowly, case by case, and tracks settled expectation; in contrast, legislations can change abruptly with political changes.

== Substantive doctrines ==
=== Theory of contract ===
Libertarians have largely rejected the orthodox view that contractual obligations rest on binding promises. They view breach of contract a justified ground for transfer title to property—for a breach of contract, the promisee would be forced by the courts to give damages to the party to whom such promise is made. The title-transfer theory interprets every enforceable agreement as a transfer of property titles: a contract conveys title to a specific resource (possibly conditional, or in the future), and what is enforced is simply the new owner's claim to what is now his. Libertarians also hold the doctrine of inalienability—rights over one's body and will cannot be permanently transferred by contract, so "voluntary slavery" agreements are unenforceable.

=== Property and intellectual property ===
The scarcity-based account of property has generated some of the sharpest internal debates within the libertarian tradition. Several prominent libertarians have argued that intellectual property rights are illegitimate, because ideas, patterns, and information, are non rivalrous; so there is no scarcity. On the contrary, right to property in ideas, has been supported by others. David Friedman has said that "there are good arguments on both sides of that (copyright and intellectual property) question."

=== Criminal punishment ===
Debates around restitution have been a dominant area in libertarian theory of law. Restitution, in particular, is a subject of intense discourse with a variety of viewpoints.

== Criticisms and debates ==
Libertarian legal theory faces objections from both outside and within.

=== Monopoly of force ===
Miniarchists and Objectivists argue that the use of retaliatory force and adjudication necessarily requires a single, objective legal authority. In this view, competing agencies would either fight each other or collude with, and "justice" sold as a service would not be impartial. The proponents of this argument include Harry Binswanger who has argued that "governments are necessary—because we need to be secure from force initiated by criminals, terrorists, and foreign invaders."

=== Market production of good laws ===
A major argument posed against anarcho-primitivism rests on the premise that competitive institutions might stabilize rules that are illiberal; collapsing into unjust outcomes, such as the "spontaneous" evolution of slavery over centuries, or a rule by warlords, which may be efficient.

The defenders against this arguments claim that as private security agencies will have an incentive to converge on non-aggression, since clients are interested in buying protection against aggression and armed conflict is costlier for everyone involved.

=== Public goods ===
The public goods argument is the standard criticism from economists, holding that defense and adjudication are public goods and would be subjected to a free-rider problem. Nozick has partly conceded to this argument, noting the redistributive character of national defense.

=== Methodological disputes ===
The naturalists and consequentialist factions within the libertarian traditions have conflicting views with each other. Natural right theorists disagree with the efficiency argument. Hoppe's argumentation ethics have been challenged on the ground that presuppositions of debate do not entail full self-ownership; a related argument rests on the age of majority, typically starting with the question whether children own themselves until the age majority. Some strict deductions from first principles and logical consistency would cannot override certain moral prescriptions, e.g., a "market for children".

=== Other critiques ===
Left-libertarians and Georgists contend that unrestricted appropriation of land and natural resources unjustly excludes others from a common inheritance. Chandran Kukathas has shown skepticism towards Hayek's attempt to build a systemic rational defense of liberal principles. Richard Posner has disputed Hayek's view of common laws as a discovery process.

== Selected thinkers and works ==
Authors discussing libertarian legal theory include:

- Andrew Napolitano
- Ayn Rand (Capitalism: The Unknown Ideal)
- Bernard Siegan (Economic Liberties and the Constitution)
- Bruce L. Benson (The Enterprise of Law: Justice Without the State)
- Bruno Leoni (Freedom and the Law)
- David Friedman (The Machinery of Freedom)
- Frank van Dun (The Fundamental Principle of Law)
- Friedrich Hayek (Law, Legislation and Liberty)
- Frédéric Bastiat (The Law)
- Gene Healy
- Hans Hermann Hoppe (The Economics and Ethics of Private Property)
- Linda and Morris Tannehill (The Market for Liberty)
- Lysander Spooner (Natural Law; or The Science of Justice)
- Murray Rothbard (The Ethics of Liberty)
- Randy Barnett (The Structure of Liberty)
- Richard Epstein (Skepticism and Freedom)
- Robert Nozick (Anarchy, State, and Utopia)
- Robert P. Murphy (Chaos Theory)
- Roger Pilon
- Stephan Kinsella (Legal Foundations of a Free Society)

== See also ==
- Anarchist law
- Constitutional economics
- Equality before the law
- Hans-Hermann Hoppe § Argumentation ethics
- Judicial activism
- Law and economics
- Outline of libertarianism
- Philosophy of law
- Polycentric law
- Rule according to higher law
