= Private defense agency =

Theoretical enterprise in economics

A private defense agency (PDA) is a theoretical enterprise which would provide personal protection and military defense services to individuals who would pay for its services. PDAs are advocated in anarcho-capitalism as a way of enforcing the system of private property.

A PDA is distinguished from a private contractor employed by a state which is usually subsidized. Instead, such agencies would in theory be financed primarily by competing insurance and security companies.

== Theory ==
Benjamin Tucker and Gustave de Molinari first explicitly proposed private defense agencies. The concept later was advanced and expanded upon by anarcho-capitalists who consider the state to be illegitimate and therefore believe defense is something that should be provided or determined privately by individuals and firms competing in a free market. The Mises Institute published a book of essays entitled The Myth of National Defense: Essays on the Theory and History of Security Production. Murray Rothbard in For a New Liberty: The Libertarian Manifesto and David D. Friedman in The Machinery of Freedom expand substantially on the idea. Both hold that a PDA would be part of a privatized system of law, police, courts, insurance companies and arbitration agencies who are responsible for preventing and dealing with aggression. In this environment, victimless crimes and "crimes against the state" would be rendered moot, and the legal realm would be limited to contractual disputes and tort damages, as from assault, burglary, pollution, and all other forms of aggression. This concept is similar to polycentric law. Within economics, discussion of the concept largely has been confined to the Austrian School, as in Hans Hoppe's article "The Private Production of Defense" published by the Mises Institute.

Accord to these authors, PDAs have different motives from existing statist defense agencies: they believe that their survival depends on quality of service leading to a wide customer base, rather than "the ability to extract funds via the force of law", and that customers and markets would thus dictate that PDAs minimize offensive tendencies and militarization in favor of a pure defense. Anarcho-capitalists believe such privatization and decentralization of defense would eliminate the credibility of, and popular support for, the state.

As a private firm offering individually determined defense, the PDA provides a model for how an entirely private defense would work in a free market. John Frederic Kosanke argues that the need for large-scale defense is minimized in direct inverse proportion to the extent of domestic control by the state. He believes that since the greater number of proprietors makes surrender more costly to an aggressor than a relatively authoritarian region, vulnerability to attack is less likely. Furthermore, he believes that since individuals minding their own business pose little threat to neighboring regions, official or ideological justification by those neighbors for attacking them is also proportionately diminished.

=== Lack of monopoly power ===
Hans Hoppe believes that there is a contradiction in the beliefs of most philosophers and economists in reference to national defense. According to his argument, they generally hold that any monopoly is "bad" for consumers because, shielded from potential new entrants into his area of production, the price of his product X will be higher and its quality lower than otherwise. Yet he says that they simultaneously hold that security must be undertaken by the government, which is a territorial monopoly of law and order (the ultimate decision maker and enforcer). Hoppe holds that the two propositions are clearly incompatible. In his essay The Production of Security, Molinari concluded:

If there is one well-established truth in political economy, it is this: That in all cases, for all commodities that serve to provide for the tangible or intangible needs of the consumer, it is in the consumer's best interest that labor and trade remain free, because the freedom of labor and of trade have as their necessary and permanent result the maximum reduction of price. And this: That the interests of the consumer of any commodity whatsoever should always prevail over the interests of the producer. Now in pursuing these principles, one arrives at this rigorous conclusion: That the production of security should, in the interests of the consumers of this intangible commodity, remain subject to the law of free competition. Whence it follows: That no government should have the right to prevent another government from going into competition with it, or to require consumers of security to come exclusively to it for this commodity.

Tyler Cowen argues that allowing private defense agencies would not necessarily prevent a monopoly on defense services, by positing that a cooperating network of such firms could use aggressive force to enforce the cartel's market domination. Noting that advocates of PDAs typically argue that abuses would be prevented by the presence of rival agencies acting under the authority of rulings made by arbitrators empowered by inter-agency arbitration agreements, Cowen opines, "The adjudication network is stable only if it can use force to put down outlaw agencies that do not accept its higher-order arbitration decisions. Such a network could also use force to put down firms that do not adhere to the collusive agreement."

Anarcho-capitalists argue that competing defense providers would concentrate on comparatively lower-cost defense and security technology rather than relatively costly offensive weaponry, in order to maintain lower premiums and service charges. A company's offensive capabilities would also be readily exposed by such an aggressor's competitors. State-subsidized militaries, in contrast, are granted a distinct offensive advantage, resulting in a proportionately greater tendency toward monopolization.

=== Aggression and abuses by private defense agencies ===
Randall G. Holcombe argues that "Firms might prey on their competitors' customers, as competing mafia groups do, to show those customers that their current protective firm is not doing the job and thus to induce them to switch protection firms. This action seems to be a profit-maximizing strategy; hence, protection firms that do not prey on noncustomers may not survive." Holcombe states that mafias offers protection for a fee, but it also uses its resources for predation; and thus profit-maximizing firms could be expected to employ them in the dual roles of protection and predation. Peter Leeson and Edward Stringham rebut this argument by claiming that unless the firm were overwhelmingly more powerful than its prey, it could incur substantial costs and risks in attempting to extract wealth by force. They argue that the potential for even a small state to inflict losses on a larger state explains why violent confrontations between states are less common than between individuals in New York City's Central Park; in other words, it is not the size of the group in question that matters, since in either case being the aggressor is likely to bring about undesirable risks and diminution of resources.

In The Market for Liberty, Linda and Morris Tannehill argue that a private defense agency would be unlikely to engage in aggression, as it would not only become a target of retaliatory force, but would become the subject of severe business ostracism. They suggest that honest and productive individuals would dissociate themselves from it, fearing that it might use its aggressive force against them in the event of a dispute; or that they might become accidental casualties when retaliatory force is used by one of its other victims; or that their own reputation would suffer due to their ties to it. Moreover, they say private defense agency's reputation would suffer and it would be regarded as a poor credit and insurance risk, the latter due to the high risk of claims resulting from its involvement in aggression. The employees and leaders of such an agency as well could face personal civil liability for their involvement, and the agency would not be shielded by sovereign immunity. High-quality employees would presumably be less willing to be involved with such an organization.

They also argue that a defense company would be less likely to abuse its power and impose tyranny, noting that it "couldn't extract taxes from them, as a government does...A market relationship is a free relationship, and if a customer doesn't like a company's service or mistrusts its goals, he is free to take his business elsewhere, or to start his own competitive company, or to do without the service and just provide from himself...The objection that a tyrant might take over is actually a devastating argument against government."

Rothbard makes a similar point, arguing, "Of course, some of the private defense agencies will become criminal, just as some people become criminal now. But the point is that in a stateless society there would be no regular, legalized channel for crime and aggression, no government apparatus the control of which provides a secure monopoly for invasion of person and property...To create such an instrument de novo is very difficult, and, indeed, almost impossible; historically, it took State rulers centuries to create a functioning State apparatus."

Alexander Villacampa argued, "If Defense Agency A instead of invading a business decides to invade a more worthwhile target such as a gold warehouse they are left with a much more complicated problem. The gold warehouse is owned by an entrepreneur who has his own defense agency and the gold in the warehouse also have owners that have hired their own respective defense agencies. In essence, Defense Agency A will have to deal with the wrath of the warehouse owner, the warehouse owner's defense agency and the defense agencies of all the owners of the gold in that warehouse."

Robert P. Murphy opines that given the privatization of other services in an anarcho-capitalist society, "We must consider that in such an environment, the law-abiding majority would have all sorts of mechanisms at their disposal, beyond physical confrontation. Once private judges had ruled against a particular rogue agency, the private banks could freeze its assets (up to the amount of fines levied by the arbitrators). In addition, the private utility companies could shut down electricity and water to the agency’s headquarters, in accordance with standard provisions in their contracts."

The argument that customers will be able to hire a competing firm to protect them against a rogue defense agency has been critiqued by Jonathan Bond's essay, The Price of Private Law, which argues, "If two defense firms are engaged in a truly ‘local’ dispute, and the remaining firms are not convinced that either their own interests will be affected or that systemic destabilization will result if the conflict continues, then the costs of intervening and ending the inter-agency war could presumably bar such third parties from stepping into the crossfire." Bond also argues that some firms may not be concerned with the risk of alienating other clients, because their clientele may consist of a small number of, or even only one, enormous multinational corporations. Bond further argues that some PDAs may reduce their risk of retaliation by carrying out anonymous sabotage or terrorist attacks.

Villacampa argues that consumers with large amounts of wealth would likely pay more for private defense, stating "There is no reason for someone void of valuable assets to hire a defense agency that is meant to protect assets other than oneself; but, in an involuntary government payment is demanded for the services regardless of whether they are use or not." He argues an alliance of aggressor private defense agencies would likely be unprofitable: "Chances are high that a mobilization of a mass army of defense agencies will cost more to each individual than his gain from gold, land, and such divided equally amongst themselves. If the region being attacked has large stashes of valuable goods, they will most likely have very effective defense agencies (stronger defense agencies for more valuable assets are logical) and thus the fight against the invading defense agencies will inflict more cost upon the invaders."

=== Financing of private defense agencies ===
Defense is often viewed as an archetypical public good – i.e., a product that can only be provided by government because of its non-excludability and non-rivalrous consumption. Specifically, the free rider problem, in which people refuse to pay for defense but instead rely on their neighbors to pay for defending the community, is said to make it inevitable that it be financed by taxes if an equitable allocation of costs is to be achieved. According to anarcho-capitalist theorists, there are many ways by which this problem can be overcome or rendered irrelevant. Rothbard's solution was to simply say "Who cares?" when it comes to the issue of free riders. He points out that free riders are commonplace in other aspects of our economy, asking hypothetically, "Are we to be critical because more than one person benefits from someone's actions?...In short, am I to be taxed for enjoying the view of my neighbor's well-kept garden?" He notes that we are all free riders on the past, as we would be living in a primitive society if it were not for the efforts of our ancestors; and we are free riders on the present, because we benefit from the continuing investment of our fellow men and from their specialized skills on the market. Joseph R. Stromberg notes that the American Revolution occurred despite the fact that some individuals might have been free riders who benefited from it without funding it; he opines that successful defense of freedom often relies not on precise allocations of cost, but on "nationalism, religion, the desire for freedom, hatred of the enemy, social pressure to do the right thing, and so on," some of which might represent "enlightened self interest."

Linda and Morris Tannehill believe that big businesses will tend to pay the bulk of the defense costs (since they stand to lose the most in the event of an attack); they would then pass on the costs to their customers, and so the costs of defense would be spread out among the whole population. A landowner seeking to establish a community may sell or lease the land with provisions written into the deed or lease agreement, requiring the new owner or tenant to pay for defense on a permanent basis; this same technique has already been in some neighborhoods to ensure that residents pay for private streets shared in common by all of them. As is true for homeowners today, everyone would be responsible for buying or otherwise being covered by aggression insurance in order to protect themselves against catastrophic loss from foreign attack; in the event of an invasion, a claim would be filed with right of subrogation, and the insurer would hire a private defense company to collect from the aggressor. An argument against this method of funding is that other aggression insurers who didn't pay for defense would still benefit from the reduced risk of attack on their customers in the same area, in effect becoming free riders who could drive the "altruistic" insurer out of business. However, the private defense agency's activity need not be limited to defensive and retaliatory measures funded by the insurer; It could also go after the aggressor in an effort to obtain restitution (including reasonable collection costs), perhaps through ransom or capture of enemy assets, as privateers did in the 18th and 19th centuries under letters of marque and reprisal. Prisoners of war also used to have shadow prices (ransoms) which were a source of income for victorious forces; this represents another potential alternative to taxation.

Sometimes arguments are made for voluntary funding of defense by way of attacking taxation. Anarcho-capitalists often argue, for instance, that the argument that taxation is needed to fund protection of liberty and property from aggression is a contradiction, because they believe taxation itself "requires aggression in order to be enforced". Another argument used by anarcho-capitalists states that, unlike voluntary transactions, no demonstrated preference has been made by the taxpayer; so they believe there is no objective way of showing that they are receiving a service they want and need, at a price that is fair.

== Historical examples ==
Some libertarians have presented historical examples of what they think were forms of private defense agencies.

=== American Old West ===
According to the research of Terry L. Anderson and P. J. Hill, the Old West in the United States in the period of 1830 to 1900 was similar to anarcho-capitalism in that "private agencies provided the necessary basis for an orderly society in which property was protected and conflicts were resolved," and that the common popular perception that the Old West was chaotic with little respect for property rights is incorrect. Since squatters had no claim to western lands under federal law, extra-legal organizations formed to fill the void. Benson explains:

The land clubs and claim associations each adopted their own written contract setting out the laws that provided the means for defining and protecting property rights in the land. They established procedures for registration of land claims, as well as for protection of those claims against outsiders, and for adjudication of internal disputes that arose. The reciprocal arrangements for protection would be maintained only if a member complied with the association's rules and its court's rulings. Anyone who refused would be ostracized. Boycott by a land club meant that an individual had no protection against aggression other than what he could provide himself.

According to Anderson, "Defining anarcho-capitalist to mean minimal government with property rights developed from the bottom up, the western frontier was anarcho-capitalistic. People on the frontier invented institutions that fit the resource constraints they faced."

== See also ==
- Insurance
- Libertarianism in the United States
- Mercenary
- Panarchism
- Pinkerton National Detective Agency
- Polycentric law
- Private governance
- Private military company
- Right-libertarianism
- Security guard
