= Libertarian manifesto =

Libertarian manifesto may refer to the following political manifestos:

- For a New Liberty: The Libertarian Manifesto, a 1973 book by Murray Rothbard originator of anarcho-capitalism
- New Libertarian Manifesto, a 1983 book by Samuel Edward Konkin III, originator of agorism
