= The Structure of Liberty =

Book by Randy Barnett

- First edition
- Author: Randy Barnett
- Language: English
- Genre: Non-fiction
- Publisher: Oxford University Press
- Publication date: 1998
- Publication place: United Kingdom
- ISBN: 978-0-198-70092-0
- OCLC: 1026797473

The Structure of Liberty: Justice and the Rule of Law is a book by legal theorist Randy Barnett which offers a libertarian theory of law and politics. Barnett calls his theory the liberal conception of justice, emphasizing the relationship between legal libertarianism and classical liberalism.

Barnett argues that private adjudication and enforcement of law, with market forces eliminating inefficiencies and inequities, is the only legal system that can provide adequate solutions to the problems of interest, power, and knowledge. Barnett uses the term "polycentric constitutional order" for anarcho-capitalism in his argument in favor of this philosophy.

== Problems in human interaction ==
Barnett's argument for the liberal conception focuses on three problems of human interaction:

- the problem of knowledge – each individual has unique knowledge about his or her own interests and situation and about how resources can best be used.
- the problem of interest – each individual has self-interests which can be coordinated through the creation of decentralized property rights.
- the problem of power – given that those with the power to impose punishments will be partial to their own interests, the power to punish or to use force to compel restitution is likely to be abused.

Barnett argues that each of these problems must be solved in order for individuals to be able to pursue their happiness under conditions of social peace.

== Liberal conception of justice ==
Barnett argues that these the problems of knowledge, interest, and power can best be solved by a form of social organization that respects the liberal conception of justice. The liberal conception has five elements:

1. Property rights, defined as rights to acquire, possess, use, and dispose of scarce physical resources.
2. The right to acquire property through first possession.
3. The right of freedom of contract, which specifies that a rightholder's consent is both necessary (freedom from contract) and sufficient (freedom to contract) to transfer alienable property rights.
4. The right of restitution, which requires that one who violates the rights of others must compensate the victim.
5. The right of self-defense.

Barnett argues that the liberal conception of justice can best be realized by a polycentric constitutional order, which substitutes private police and dispute resolution mechanisms instead of the state ones.

== Editions ==
- The Structure of Liberty. (2014 edition), Oxford University Press, ISBN 978-0198700920, OCLC 1026797473
