= The Voluntary City =

2002 book edited by David T. Beito

The Voluntary City: Choice, Community, and Civil Society
- Editor: David T. Beito
- Genre: Non-fiction
- Publisher: Independent Institute
- Publication date: 2002
- Publication place: United States

The Voluntary City: Choice, Community, and Civil Society is a 2002 Independent Institute-published book, edited by David T. Beito, about communities with private provision of municipal services. Contributors include Stephen Davies, Daniel B. Klein, Robert C. Arne, Bruce L. Benson, David G. Green, James Tooley, Fred E. Foldvary, Donald J. Boudreaux, Randall G. Holcombe, Robert H. Nelson, Spencer H. MacCallum, and Alexander Tabarrok. It covers the topics of privatized provision of urban infrastructure, roads, planning, police, charity, medical care, education, and commercial regulation, particularly through examination of historical examples of this provision.

The book has also been praised for its bibliography, which has many useful resources on privatization. Among the examples the book gives of private communities are the private places of St. Louis and the Central Manufacturing District of Chicago.

== See also ==
- Voluntary community
