= The Machinery of Freedom =

1973 nonfiction book by David D. Friedman

The Machinery of Freedom: Guide to a Radical Capitalism
- Cover
- Author: David D. Friedman
- Language: English
- Subject: Anarcho-capitalism
- Publisher: Open Court Publishing Company
- Publication date: 1973; 2nd edition 1989; 3rd edition 2014
- Publication place: United States
- Media type: Paperback, Electronic
- ISBN: 0-8126-9069-9
- OCLC: 19388655
- Dewey Decimal: 323.44 19
- LC Class: JC585 .F76 1989

The Machinery of Freedom is a nonfiction book by David D. Friedman that advocates an anarcho-capitalist society from a consequentialist perspective.

The book was published in 1973, with a second edition in 1989 and a third edition in 2014.

== Overview ==
The book aims to show that law and its enforcement do not require a state, but can be sustained by non-coercive private enterprise and charity. It explores the consequences of libertarian thought, describes examples of stateless societies (such as the Icelandic Commonwealth) and offers the author's personal statement about why he became a libertarian. Topics addressed in the book include polycentric law and the provision of public goods such as military defense in a stateless society. Friedman argues that a stateless legal system would be beneficial for society as a whole, including the poor.

While some books supporting similar libertarian and anarcho-capitalist views offer support in terms of morality or natural rights, Friedman (although he explicitly denies being a utilitarian) (Note: Second Edition, p. 165) here argues largely in terms of the effects of his proposed policies.

Friedman conjectures that anything done by government costs at least twice as much as a privately provided equivalent, (Note: Second edition, p. 85.) which has been labeled as his eponymous law: "It costs any government at least twice as much to do something as it costs anyone else." He offers examples as evidence such as a comparison of the cost of the United States Postal Service's costs for package delivery with the costs of private carriers and the cost of the Soviet government versus market based services in the West. (Note: Second edition, p. 85.)

== Reception ==
The Institute of Public Affairs, a libertarian think tank located in Australia, included The Machinery of Freedom in a list of the "Top 20 books you must read before you die" in 2006.

Liberty magazine named the book among The Top Ten Best Libertarian Books, praising Friedman for tackling the problems related to private national defense systems and attempting to solve them.

== Related books ==
- The Problem of Political Authority by Michael Huemer builds on Friedman's vision of an anarcho-capitalist society in considerable detail
- Chaos Theory by Robert P. Murphy
- Order Without Law by Robert Ellickson
- For a New Liberty by Murray Rothbard
- The Market for Liberty by Linda and Morris Tannehill
- The Enterprise of Law by Bruce L. Benson

== See also ==
- Dispersed knowledge
- Government success
- Milton Friedman – father of David Friedman
- Tax choice
- X-inefficiency
