= To Serve and Protect (disambiguation) =

To Serve and Protect is a Canadian reality crime television series.

To Serve and Protect may also refer to:

- To Serve and Protect (book), a 1998 book by Bruce L. Benson
- To Serve and Protect: Tragedy at Mayerthorpe, a 2008 Canadian TV film
- To Serve and Protect (Champions), a 1988 role-playing game adventure
- "To Protect and Serve: Part 1" and "To Protect and Serve: Part 2", two episodes of the TV series The Rockford Files season 3
- "Serve & Protect", an episode of the American TV series Brooklyn Nine-Nine

== See also ==
- To protect and to serve (disambiguation)
