= Defence company =

Defence company may mean:

- Private defense company, an enterprise which would provide personal protection and military defense services to individuals who would voluntarily contract for its services
- Private military company, provides armed security services, i.e. "Contractors"
- Defense Companies (Syria), a former paramilitary force
- Arms industry, a business that manufactures weapons and military technology and equipment.
