= To protect and to serve =

To protect and to serve may refer to:

- "To Protect and to Serve", the motto of the Los Angeles Police Department since 1963, subsequently adopted by many other police forces in North America
- The legal concept of police responsibility for public safety – see Police § Protection of individuals
- A.D. Police: To Protect and Serve, a Japanese animated television series
- "To Protect and Serve" (The Twilight Zone), a Twilight Zone episode
- "To Protect and Serve" (Only Murders in the Building), a 2021 episode of the TV series Only Murders in the Building

== See also ==
- To Serve and Protect (disambiguation)
