= Radicals for Capitalism =

Book by Brian Doherty

Radicals for Capitalism: A Freewheeling History of the Modern American Libertarian Movement
- Cover of the first edition
- Author: Brian Doherty
- Subject: Libertarianism
- Publisher: PublicAffairs
- Publication date: 2007
- Publication place: United States
- Media type: Print (hardback and paperback)
- Pages: 741
- ISBN: 978-1-58648-350-0
- OCLC: 433347326

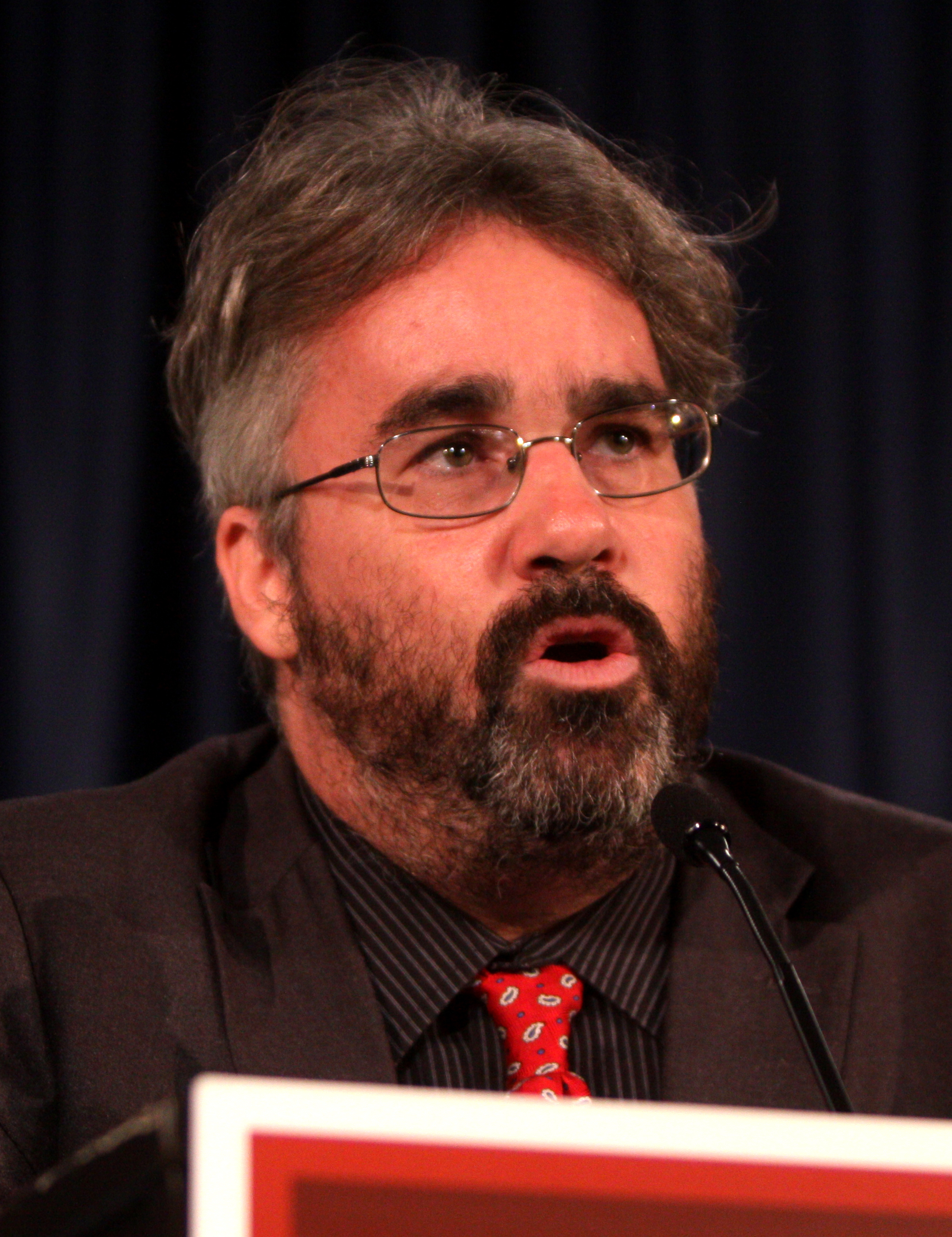
The author in 2012

Radicals for Capitalism: A Freewheeling History of the Modern American Libertarian Movement is a 2007 book about the history of 20th-century American libertarianism by journalist and Reason senior editor Brian Doherty. He traces the evolution of the movement, as well as the life stories of Ayn Rand, Milton Friedman, Ludwig von Mises, F. A. Hayek, and Murray Rothbard, and details how they intertwined.

Doherty does not proceed strictly in chronological order, preferring instead to break up the action into short stories on central themes.

== Reception ==
Radicals for Capitalism was reviewed in The New York Times, The San Diego Union-Tribune and The Washington Times. The Guardian proclaimed it to be "the standard history of the libertarian movement for years to come".

== See also ==
- For a New Liberty
