= To Serve and Protect (book) =

1998 book by Bruce L. Benson

- First edition
- Author: Bruce L. Benson
- Language: English
- Genre: Non-fiction
- Publisher: NYU Press
- Publication date: 1998
- Publication place: United States
- ISBN: 978-0-8147-1327-3

To Serve and Protect: Privatization and Community in Criminal Justice is a 1998 book by Bruce L. Benson about private policing, private prosecution, and other market-based methods of providing criminal justice. Benson traces the history of government's escalating involvement in criminal justice over the past centuries in the United Kingdom and in the United States, and argues that it has resulted in overpriced, low-quality service that does not adequately address the needs of communities and crime victims. He argues for parole bonds, restorative justice, shifting toward a criminal justice system that resembles the civil tort system, and other reforms.

== Reception ==
=== Praise ===
The book was praised for its "trove of compelling observations, anecdotes, and conjectures," for its "nearly encyclopedic" coverage of private techniques in criminal justice, and for elevating the discussion of criminal justice to a higher philosophical plane by redirecting the reader's attention away from social engineering goals like deterrence and rehabilitation toward a focus on justice and individual rights and responsibilities. It was praised for its summary of the role of private contributions to the criminal justice system, such as witness testimony and the bail bondsman system. It was also praised for applying economics, including incentives analysis, to the study of law.

=== Criticism ===
The book is written in a 'dogmatic' style, as one reviewer notes, "His writing is heavy going in places, drifting off into Ayn Rand-like pronouncements. John Galt might have written much of Chapter 10, for example. Still, the reader who stays the course will learn a great deal from this book." The book was criticized for being profoundly dogmatic rather than scholarly and open-minded, assuming that government inefficiencies and scandals are inevitable, downplaying the potential for private firms to commit some of the same abuses that the government commits, painting an overly positive picture of vigilantism, presenting conjecture and assertion as fact, failing to address the disparity between anti-crime resource expenditures directed toward the poor and the rich, promoting potentially divisive gated communities and private streets, falsely stating that researcher Philip J. Cook had found that gun controls tend to increase crime, and saying too little about the problem of determining optimal restitution amounts in cases of homicide, rape, and other violent crimes and in cases of obstruction of justice. One critic wrote, "To Serve and Protect draws cartoon images: the market is a resourceful Roadrunner, who at every turn defeats a Wile E. Coyote government capable only of colossally complicated and corrupt schemes that are doomed inevitably to fail." The book was also criticized for sometimes failing to use the latest data available, for being too quick to attribute facts to the statist nature of the justice system rather than to rent-seeking by lawyers, for being silent on the role of faith-based and other voluntary, nonprofit entities in a privatized system, for ignoring the impact that full restitution could have on investment in private defense against crime, and for its dull prose. It was also criticized for not adequately addressing criticism of private prisons and of firms such as the Pinkerton Detective Agency.
