= Brian Doherty (journalist) =

American journalist and editor (1968–2026)

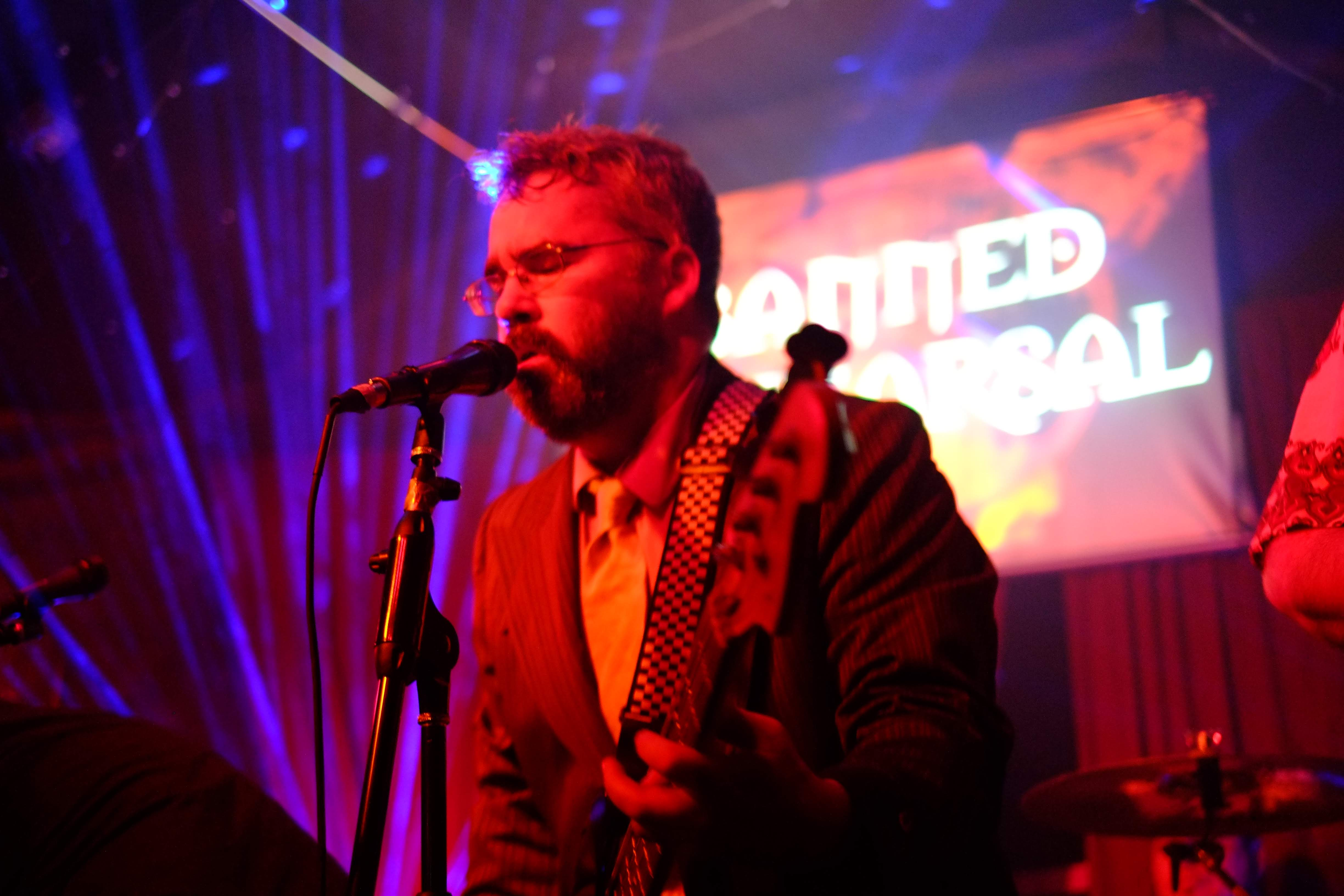
- Doherty playing electric bass in 2015
- Born: June 1, 1968; New York City, U.S.
- Died: c. March 12, 2026 (aged 57) near Sausalito, California, U.S.
- Education: University of Florida (BA)
- Occupations: Author; editor
- Writing career
- Subject: Libertarianism in the United States

Brian Michael Doherty (June 1, 1968 – c. March 12, 2026) was an American journalist and author. He was a senior editor at Reason magazine.

== Background ==
Brian Michael Doherty was born in Queens, New York, on June 1, 1968, and grew up in Florida. He studied journalism at the University of Florida.

== Career ==
Doherty was the author of This Is Burning Man: The Rise of a New American Underground (Little, Brown, 2004), Radicals for Capitalism: A Freewheeling History of the Modern American Libertarian Movement (PublicAffairs, 2007), Gun Control on Trial: Inside the Supreme Court Battle Over the Second Amendment (Cato Institute, 2008), Ron Paul's Revolution: The Man and the Movement He Inspired (Broadside Books, 2012), Dirty Pictures: How an Underground Network of Nerds, Feminists, Misfits, Geniuses, Bikers, Potheads, Printers, Intellectuals, and Art School Rebels Revolutionized Art and Invented Comix (Harry N. Abrams, 2022), and Modern Libertarianism: A Brief History of Classical Liberalism in the United States (Libertarianism.org, 2025).

He wrote articles published in dozens of newspapers and magazines, including The Washington Post, The Wall Street Journal, the Los Angeles Times, Mother Jones, Spin, National Review, the Weekly Standard, and the San Francisco Chronicle.

Before working for the Cato Institute in the early 1990s, Doherty served as an intern at Liberty magazine and wrote on music and popular culture at The Independent Florida Alligator. As a student at the University of Florida, where he received a degree in journalism, Doherty played bass in several punk rock bands, including The Jeffersons and Turbo Satan. He founded Cherry Smash Records in 1993.

Doherty said that he was a "principled nonvoter" who had "been saved the embarrassment of ever having to feel any sense of responsibility, of even the smallest size, for the actions of any politician."

== Personal life and death ==
Doherty was in a long-term relationship with Angela Keaton until they separated in 2012. He was then in a relationship with Meghan Ralston until 2018. He lived in Cathedral City, California.

On March 12, 2026, Doherty fell from a scenic overlook while walking at the Golden Gate National Recreation Area near Sausalito, California and died; his body was discovered the next day.
