= Parole bond =

A parole bond is a deposit of money or property made to the government as a guarantee that a paroled prisoner will comply with the terms of their release. The bond may be funded by the prisoner themselves, or they may borrow from friends or family; or provided by a bondsman in exchange for a fee.

The underlying theory is that those providing the financial support—whether through personal funds, loans, or bondsman services—have an incentive to ensure the parolee does not pose an unacceptably high risk prior to assisting with their release. Additionally, they are motivated to help them stay out of trouble after their release. For the prisoner, there is an incentive to demonstrate good behavior during incarceration to prove they are reformed and unlikely to violate parole. Once on parole, the risk of forfeiting the bond serves as a strong deterrent against violating the terms, as such forfeiture could make future surety from family, friends, or bondsmen more difficult to obtain.

Parole bonds are sometimes used to alleviate overcrowded prisons. The concept is closely related to bail bonds, and similar statutes often allow bondsmen to recover all or part of the bond by surrendering the parolee to authorities. This may require the use of bounty hunters to locate and apprehend the individual.

Organizations like the National Association of Bail Insurance Companies and the American Legislative Exchange Council (ALEC), a national bipartisan group of conservative legislators, advocate that financially secured postconviction release is more effective than unsecured release.
