= Anarcho-capitalism =

Political ideology and economic theory

The black and gold flag, a symbol of anarchism (black) and capitalism (gold) which, according to Murray Rothbard, was first flown in 1963 in Colorado

Anarcho-capitalism (colloquially: AnCap) is a political ideology and economic theory that advocates the replacement of all coercive government institutions with private enterprise, along with the expansion of economic liberalism and a market economy through the promotion of a voluntary society.

Proponents argue that a society could function without a centralized state through voluntary exchange and private businesses that provide legal and security services, relegating coercion to the collection of tort damages, and refining recoupment in the context of a free and open marketplace. They contend that essential public services, including policing, courts, and defense are dramatically improved to the extent of competition among alternative dispute resolution providers, private defense agencies, subrogation markets, and insurance/reinsurance contractors.

This synthesis of anti-statism and private property remains deeply controversial among anarchists in general, the overwhelming majority of whom reject capitalism. They argue that the market structure advocated by anarcho-capitalists, including private land ownership, wage systems, law and contract enforcement, and workplace hierarchy, is inherently hierarchical and governmentalist, and therefore incompatible with anarchist principles.

While the earliest documented use of the term anarcho-capitalism appears in Karl Hess's essay, "The Death of Politics", published in Playboy in March 1969, the American economist Murray Rothbard largely developed and popularized the concepts of anarcho-capitalists and anarcho-capitalism in the early 1970s.

== Classification ==
Rothbard, an American libertarian, drew on elements of the Austrian school of economics, Ayn Rand's Objectivism, classical liberalism and 19th-century American individualist anarchist thinkers Lysander Spooner and Benjamin Tucker. However, he rejected the individualist anarchist labor theory of value, opposition to non-usufruct property, lack of support for constitutional law and private courts, their economic theories (especially support for mutual credit, land banking, opposition to usury, rent and wage system), views on justice system (such as support for jury trials and jury nullification), and their opposition to absolute land ownership, including the right of landowners to set rules on their land.

Most anarchists do not view anarcho-capitalism as anarchist, since they understand anarchism as a system that is incompatible with capitalism. (Note: Attributed to multiple sources:) Anarcho-capitalism lies outside the tradition of the vast majority of anarchist schools of thought and is therefore more closely associated with right-libertarianism, voluntaryism, and classical liberalism, and is occasionally considered part of the New Right. (Note: Attributed to multiple sources:) Anarchists oppose capitalism, law and contract enforcment, hierarchies, private property, and consider "anarcho-capitalism" to be a contradiction in terms. Despite this, anarcho-capitalists and some right-libertarians consider anarcho-capitalism to be a form of anarchism, with some even considering it to be the only true form of anarchism.

According to Murray Rothbard, anarcho-capitalism comes from objectivism taken to its natural conclusion of privatizing all services, including police and courts, and that its "closest historical links are with the 'individualist anarchism' of Benjamin R. Tucker and Lysander Spooner".

In his posthumous work Are Libertarians “Anarchists”?, originally written in the mid-1950s, Rothbard concludes that he is not an anarchist on both the etymological and historical grounds. He did not believe in "establishing a tyrannical central authority that will coerce the noninvasive as well as the invasive", but he did not consider himself an archist either, proposing the new label "nonarchist". By 1972, Murray Rothbard would come to retract this view and assert that anarcho-capitalists are, in fact, anarchists.

== Philosophy ==
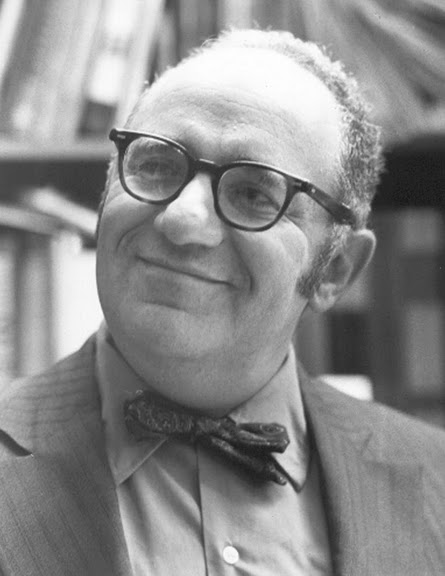
Murray Rothbard (1926–1995), who is credited with coining the words anarcho-capitalist and anarcho-capitalism

An early formulation is the concept of "individual sovereignty", emphasized by the Belgian economist Gustave de Molinari. In this framework, sovereignty resides in the individual's absolute ownership of their person and property rather than in the state. Consequently, any social need – including the protection of rights – is viewed as a commodity that the individual has the sovereign right to produce personally or purchase from competing private providers in a free market.

According to author J. Michael Oliver, a philosophical movement arose during the 1960s in the United States that championed "reason, ethical egoism, and free-market capitalism." Oliver states that anarcho-capitalism is a political theory that follows Objectivism, a philosophical system developed by Ayn Rand. However, he acknowledged that his advocacy of anarcho-capitalism is "quite at odds with Rand's ardent defense of 'limited government'". Professor Lisa Duggan also said that Rand's anti-statist, pro–free market stances went on to shape the politics of anarcho-capitalism.

According to Patrik Schumacher, the political ideology and program of anarcho-capitalism envisages the radicalization of the neoliberal "rollback of the state." It also calls for the extension of "entrepreneurial freedom" and "competitive market rationality" to the point where the scope for private enterprise is all-encompassing and "leaves no space for state action whatsoever."

Molinari described the aim as "liberty of government", arguing that transitioning society from a forced artificial institution to a "purely natural fact" based on human sociability and needs. In this vision, authority is not abolished but transformed; it shifts from a territorial monopoly imposed by coercion to a service accepted and respected based on its utility. By replacing the "terror" of the state with voluntary associations, anarcho-capitalists argue that peace becomes the natural consequence of liberty, just as war is seen as the natural consequence of monopoly.

=== On the state ===
Anarcho-capitalists seek to privatize law enforcement along with all other government services such as education, charity, and infrastructure. They see capitalism and the free market as the basis for a free and prosperous society. Murray Rothbard states that the difference between free-market capitalism and state capitalism is the difference between "peaceful, voluntary exchange" and a "collusive partnership" between business and government that "relies on coercive mechanisms that interfere with market processes." Rothbard argues that all government services, including defense, are inefficient because they lack a market-based pricing mechanism regulated by "the voluntary decisions of consumers purchasing services that fulfill their highest-priority needs" and by investors seeking the most profitable enterprises to invest in.

Rothbard used the term anarcho-capitalism to distinguish his philosophy from anarchism that opposes private property as well as to distinguish it from individualist anarchism. Other terms sometimes used by proponents of the philosophy include:

- Individualist anarchism
- Natural order
- Ordered anarchy
- Private-law society
- Private-property anarchy
- Radical capitalism

Maverick Edwards of Liberty University describes anarcho-capitalism as a political, social, and economic theory that places markets as the central "governing body" and where government no longer "grants" rights to its citizenry.

Anarchist critics such as Peter Sabatini and Bob Black argue that private defense agencies would act as private states, leading to coercion.

The debate between minarchism, that is, advocacy for retaining a minimum "night watchman" state on the one hand, and anarcho-capitalism, which seeks to abolish the state, is a major topic of contention in modern libertarian circles. Anarcho-capitalists see minarchism as inconsistent, because it claims to oppose compulsion while advocating compulsory funding for, and centralized provision of, the very industry most likely to endanger person and property – namely the military. For anarcho-capitalists, the non-aggression principle can have no exceptions.

In Anarchy, State, and Utopia, libertarian philosopher Robert Nozick argues that anarcho-capitalism would inevitably transform into his desired minarchist state, even without violating any of its own non-aggression principles. A single locally dominant private defense and judicial agency would eventually emerge with other agencies unable to effectively compete against its advantages. Therefore, even to the extent that the anarcho-capitalist theory is correct, it may only exist for a limited period before a single, private, protective agency emerges that functions as a de facto minimalist "state".

Rothbard was so vehemently opposed to minarchism that he dedicated Chapter 29 of The Ethics of Liberty to refuting Nozick's "night watchman state" argument. Rothbard expounded on how PDAs, competing insurers, and private courts would replace the state. Private judges and arbitrators do not "make law". They simply apply the universal principals of property rights in a real world context and in real time. Without a legal monopoly a standardized body of case law and precedent aligned with NAP naturally emerges, which competing law merchants tend to consult.

Rothbard defines coercion as “the invasive use of physical violence or the threat thereof against someone else’s person or (just) property.” Hoppe in Democracy: The God That Failed defined a state as "an agency that exercises a compulsory territorial monopoly of protection and the power to tax." In The Law (1850), Frédéric Bastiat vehemently opposed state-enforced redistribution and progressive taxation, classifying them as "legal plunder" where the state utilizes its coercive power to violate private property rights under the guise of philanthropy. Bastiat argued that the state perverts its purported purpose of protecting liberty when it forcibly extracts wealth, noting that "[the law] could not organize labor, education, and religion without destroying justice" and asserting that nothing can enter the public treasury for one citizen unless others "have been forced to send it in."

Other variations of anarchists reject anarcho-capitalism's solutions to the state as non-anarchist due to retaining hierarchical structures.

=== On egalitarianism ===
Anarcho-capitalist theorists argue that left-wing forms of anarchism, such as anarcho-communism and anarcho-socialism, contain an inherent logical contradiction. They maintain that because human beings possess naturally diverse talents, preferences, and choices, unequal economic outcomes are an inevitable result of voluntary interaction. Consequently, they argue that any system attempting to enforce absolute equality of outcome or suppress private property rights would require a centralized, coercive apparatus to continuously intervene and restrict voluntary trade—rendering a state-free egalitarian society an impossibility.

Murray Rothbard addressed the relationship between egalitarian goals and state power in his 1970 essay, Egalitarianism as a Revolt Against Nature, asserting that the enforcement of equality requires total authority. Rothbard explicitly argued that left-anarchists cannot maintain a stateless system without either accepting market outcomes or establishing a new state mechanism to suppress them.

=== Non-aggression principle ===
Writer Stanisław Wójtowicz suggests that although anarcho-capitalists are against centralized states, they believe that all people would naturally share and agree to a specific legal theory based on the non-aggression principle. While the Friedmanian formulation of anarcho-capitalism considers the presence of violence and assumes some degree of violence will occur, anarcho-capitalism as formulated by thinkers such as Rothbard holds strongly to the central libertarian nonaggression axiom.

The basic axiom of libertarian political theory holds that every man is a self-owner, having absolute jurisdiction over his own body. In effect, this means that no one else may justly invade, or aggress against, another's person. It follows then that each person justly owns whatever previously unowned resources he appropriates or "mixes his labor with". From these twin axioms – self-ownership and "homesteading" – stem the justification for the entire system of property rights titles in a free-market society. This system establishes the right of every man to his own person, the right of donation, of bequest (and, concomitantly, the right to receive the bequest or inheritance), and the right of contractual exchange of property titles.

Rothbard's defense of the self-ownership principle stems from what he believed to be his falsification of all other alternatives, namely that either a group of people can own another group of people, or that no single person has full ownership over oneself. Rothbard dismisses these two cases on the basis that they cannot result in a universal ethic, i.e. a just natural law that can govern all people, independent of place and time. The only alternative that remains to Rothbard is self-ownership, which he believes is both axiomatic and universal.

In general, Rothbard describes the non-aggression axiom as a prohibition against initiating force, or the threat of force, against persons (including direct violence, assault, and murder) or property (including fraud, burglary, theft, and taxation). Violations of property rights (including the self-ownership) is usually referred by anarcho-capitalists as aggression or coercion. The difference between anarcho-capitalists and other libertarians is largely one of the degree to which they take this axiom. Minarchist libertarians, such as libertarian political parties would retain the state in some smaller and less invasive form, retaining at the very least public police, courts, and military. However, others might give further allowance for other government programs. In contrast, Rothbard rejects any level of "state intervention", defining the state as a coercive monopoly and as the only entity in human society, excluding acknowledged criminals, that derives its income entirely from coercion, in the form of taxation, which Rothbard describes as "compulsory seizure of the property of the state's inhabitants, or subjects."

Some anarcho-capitalists, including Rothbard, accept the non-aggression axiom on an intrinsic moral or natural law basis. It is in terms of the non-aggression principle that Rothbard defined his interpretation of anarchism, "a system which provides no legal sanction for such aggression "against persons and property" and wrote that "what anarchism proposes to do, then, is to abolish the State, i.e. to abolish the regularized institution of aggressive coercion." In an interview published in the American libertarian journal The New Banner, Rothbard stated that "capitalism is the fullest expression of anarchism, and anarchism is the fullest expression of capitalism."

=== Property ===
==== Private property ====
Anarcho-capitalists support the privatization of everything, including cities with all their infrastructures, public spaces, streets, and urban management systems.

Central to Rothbardian anarcho-capitalism are the concepts of self-ownership and original appropriation that combine personal and private property. Hans-Hermann Hoppe wrote:

Everyone is the proper owner of his own physical body as well as of all places and nature-given goods that he occupies and puts to use by means of his body, provided only that no one else has already occupied or used the same places and goods before him. This ownership of "originally appropriated" places and goods by a person implies his right to use and transform these places and goods in any way he sees fit, provided only that he does not change thereby uninvitedly the physical integrity of places and goods originally appropriated by another person. In particular, once a place or good has been first appropriated by, in John Locke's phrase, 'mixing one's labor' with it, ownership in such places and goods can be acquired only by means of a voluntary – contractual – transfer of its property title from a previous to a later owner.

Rothbard, however, rejects the Lockean proviso and follows the rule of "first come, first served", without any consideration of what resources are left for other individuals.

Anarcho-capitalists advocate private ownership of the means of production and the allocation of the product of labor created by workers within the context of wage labor and the free market – that is, through decisions made by property and capital owners, regardless of what an individual needs or does not need. Original appropriation allows an individual to claim any never-before-used resources, including land, and by improving or otherwise using it, own it with the same "absolute right" as their own body, and retain those rights forever, regardless of whether the resource is still being used by them. According to Rothbard, property can only come about through labor, therefore original appropriation of land is not legitimate by merely claiming it or building a fence around it – it is only by using land and by mixing one's labor with it that original appropriation is legitimized: "Any attempt to claim a new resource that someone does not use would have to be considered invasive of the property right of whoever the first user will turn out to be." Rothbard argues that the resource need not continue to be used for it to be the person's property as "for once his labor is mixed with the natural resource, it remains his owned land. His labor has been irretrievably mixed with the land, and the land is therefore his or his assigns' in perpetuity."

Rothbard also argues about a theory of justice in property rights:

It is not enough to call simply for the defense of "the rights of private property"; there must be an adequate theory of justice in property rights, else any property that some State once decreed to be "private" must now be defended by libertarians, no matter how unjust the procedure or how mischievous its consequences.

In Justice and Property Rights, Rothbard writes that "any identifiable owner (the original victim of theft or his heir) must be accorded his property." In the case of slavery, Rothbard claims that in many cases "the old plantations and the heirs and descendants of the former slaves can be identified, and the reparations can become highly specific indeed." Rothbard believes slaves rightfully own any land they were forced to work on under the homestead principle. If property is held by the state, Rothbard advocates its confiscation and "return to the private sector", writing that "any property in the hands of the State is in the hands of thieves and should be liberated as quickly as possible." Rothbard proposed that state universities be seized by the students and faculty under the homestead principle. Rothbard also supported the expropriation of nominally "private property" if it is the result of state-initiated force such as businesses that receive grants and subsidies.

According to Rothbard what he objects to "is not government per se but crime, what we object to is unjust or criminal property titles; what we are for is not 'private' property per se but just, innocent, non-criminal private property."

Similarly, Karl Hess wrote that "libertarianism wants to advance principles of property, but it in no way wishes to defend, indiscriminately, all property which now is called private ... Much of that property is stolen. Much is of dubious title. All of it is deeply intertwined with an immoral, coercive state system."

Classical anarchists view capitalism and institutions of law enforcement and wage system as an inherently authoritarian and hierarchical system and seek the abolishment of private property. Anarcho-capitalists don't disagree, but consider property- and contract-based hierarchies to be acceptable or even desirable. For that reason there is disagreement between most anarchists and anarcho-capitalists as the former generally rejects anarcho-capitalism as a form of anarchism and considers anarcho-capitalism a contradiction in terms, while the latter holds that the abolishment of private property and the wage system would require expropriation and anti-market state regulation, which is "counterproductive to order" and would require a state.

==== Common property ====
As opposed to most anarchists, most anarcho-capitalists reject the commons, maintaining that multiplicity of ownership proportionally reduces accountability, resulting in pollution and the tragedy of the commons. However, some propose that non-state public or community property can also exist in an anarcho-capitalist society. For anarcho-capitalists, what is important is that it is "acquired" and transferred without help or hindrance from the "compulsory state". Deontological anarcho-capitalists believe that the only just and most economically beneficial way to acquire property is through voluntary trade, gift, or labor-based original appropriation, rather than through aggression or fraud.

Some left-Rothbardian anarcho-capitalists like Roderick T. Long argue that there could be cases where common property may develop in a Lockean natural rights framework. Anarcho-capitalists make the example of many private businesses that may arise in an area, each owning the land and buildings that they use, but they argue that the paths between them become clear through customer and commercial movement. These paths may become valuable to the community, but according to them, ownership cannot be attributed to any single person and original appropriation does not apply because many contributed the labor necessary to create them. To prevent it from falling to the "tragedy of the commons", anarcho-capitalists suggest transitioning from common to private property, wherein an individual would make a homesteading claim based on disuse, acquire title by the assent of the community consensus, form a corporation with other involved parties, or other means.

American economist Randall G. Holcombe sees challenges stemming from the idea of common property under anarcho-capitalism, such as whether an individual might claim fishing rights in the area of a major shipping lane and thereby forbid passage through it. In contrast, Hoppe's work on anarcho-capitalist theory is based on the assumption that all property is privately held, including "all streets, rivers, airports, and harbors", which forms the foundation of his views on immigration.

==== Intellectual property ====
Many anarcho-capitalists are critical of the legitimacy of intellectual property (i.e., trademarks, patents, copyrights). IP is typically opposed on the grounds that ideas are seen as lacking scarcity; and implementing an idea does not prevent another party from implementing the same idea. Further, the arbitrary nature of intellectual property is commonly criticized. N. Stephan Kinsella argues that ownership only relates to tangible assets.

Rothbard argued for allowing contractually arising infinite copyright terms and against the need for any government role in protecting intellectual property. Rothbard states that government's involvement in defining arbitrary limits on the duration and scope of intellectual property in order to "promote the Progress of Science and useful Arts" is inherently problematic, saying: "By what standard do you judge that research expenditures are 'too much,' 'too little,' or just about enough?"" Thus, he argued that patent laws can actually hinder innovation since competitors can be indefinitely discouraged from further research expenditures in the general area covered by the patent. The courts may hold their improvements as infringements on the previous patent, and the patent holder is discouraged from engaging in further research in this field because the privilege discourages improvement of their invention for the entire period of the patent, with the assurance that no competitor can trespass on their domain.

In contrast to the dominant anti-intellectual property sentiment among modern anarcho-capitalists, 19th-century individualist anarchist Lysander Spooner provided a comprehensive defense of intellectual property in his 1855 treatise, The Law of Intellectual Property: or An Essay on the Right of Authors and Inventors to a Perpetual Property in Their Ideas. Drawing from the principles of natural law and tort law, Spooner argued that property rights are not strictly limited to corporeal or tangible commodities. To demonstrate this, he observed that non-physical human attributes such as health, strength, and the physical senses are fundamentally incorporeal, yet they are universally recognized as "valuable possessions, and subjects of property" despite being susceptible to impairment or loss "without the loss of any corporeal substance." Under tort law, a tortfeasor who inflicts harm upon these non-physical qualities is legally and morally required to make the victim whole by paying compensatory damages. For Spooner, this established that property rights can—and must—extend their reach beyond physical objects, illustrating that the acquisition of all property depends fundamentally upon human effort, an asset that cannot be seen or touched.

=== Contractual society ===
The society envisioned by anarcho-capitalists has been labelled by them as a "contractual society" which Rothbard described as "a society based purely on voluntary action, entirely unhampered by violence or threats of violence" The system relies on contracts between individuals as the legal framework which would be enforced by private police and security forces as well as private arbitration.

Rothbard argues that limited liability for corporations could also exist through contract, arguing that "Corporations are not at all monopolistic privileges; they are free associations of individuals pooling their capital. On the purely free market, those men would simply announce to their creditors that their liability is limited to the capital specifically invested in the corporation."

There are limits to the right to contract under some interpretations of anarcho-capitalism. Rothbard believes that the right to contract is based in inalienable rights and because of this any contract that implicitly violates those rights can be voided at will, preventing a person from permanently selling himself or herself into indentured slavery. That restriction aside, the right to contract under anarcho-capitalist order would be pretty broad. For example, Rothbard went as far as to justify stork markets, arguing that a market in guardianship rights would facilitate the transfer of guardianship from abusive or neglectful parents to those more interested or suited to raising children. Other anarcho-capitalists have also suggested the legalization of organ markets, as in Iran's renal market. Other interpretations conclude that banning such contracts would, in itself, be an unacceptably invasive interference in the right to contract. Some anarcho-capitalist philosophies understand control of private property as part of the self, and some permit voluntary slavery. The vast majority of anarcho‑capitalists deny this, and critics of capitalism argue that this minority opinion is not unique to anarcho-capitalists, but is an essential consequence of the capitalist contract theory (wage slavery).

The right to contract includes "the right to contract oneself out for employment by others." While anarchists criticize wage labor, describing it as wage slavery, anarcho-capitalists view it as a consensual contract. Some anarcho-capitalists prefer to see self-employment prevail over wage labor. David D. Friedman has expressed a preference for a society where "almost everyone is self-employed" and "instead of corporations there are large groups of entrepreneurs related by trade, not authority. Each sells not his time, but what his time produces."

=== Law and order and the use of violence ===
Anarcho-capitalists differ in how they envision the production of law in the absence of the state. In The Market for Liberty, Morris and Linda Tannehill object to any statutory law whatsoever, arguing that all one has to do is ask if one is aggressing against another to decide if an act is right or wrong. However, while also supporting a natural prohibition on force and fraud, Rothbard supports the establishment of a mutually agreed-upon centralized libertarian legal code which private courts would pledge to follow, as he presumes a high degree of convergence amongst individuals about what constitutes natural justice. This legal code would recognize contracts between individuals, private property, self-ownership, and tort law in accordance with the non-aggression principle.

Unlike both Rothbard and the Tannehill couple, who see an ideological commonality of ethics and morality as a requirement, David D. Friedman proposes that "the systems of law will be produced for profit on the open market, just as books and bras are produced today. There could be competition among different brands of law, just as there is competition among different brands of cars." Friedman says whether this would lead to a libertarian society "remains to be proven." He says it is a possibility that very un-libertarian laws may result, such as laws against drugs, but he thinks this would be rare. He reasons that "if the value of a law to its supporters is less than its cost to its victims, that law...will not survive in an anarcho-capitalist society."

Anarcho-capitalists only accept the collective defense of property rights (i.e. courts, military, or police forces) insofar as such groups are formed and paid for on an explicitly voluntary basis. However, their complaint is not just that the state's defensive services are funded by taxation, but that the state assumes it is the only legitimate practitioner of physical force – that is, they believe it forcibly prevents the private sector from providing comprehensive security, such as a police, judicial and prison systems to protect individuals from aggressors. Anarcho-capitalists believe that there is nothing morally superior about the state which would grant it, but not private individuals, a right to use physical force to restrain aggressors. If competition in security provision were allowed to exist, prices would be lower and services would also be better according to anarcho-capitalists. According to Molinari: "Under a regime of liberty, the natural organization of the security industry would not be different from that of other industries."

Building on this, early theoretical formulations posit that the "production of security" should be treated as an "immaterial commodity" subject to the law of free competition. In this model, individuals would subscribe to security or insurance companies based on trust and contractual terms. Proponents argue that the absence of a de jure monopoly ensures that consumers can transfer their loyalty to a competitor if a provider fails to deliver justice or raises prices, thereby maintaining accountability through market pressure.

Proponents believe that private systems of justice and defense already exist, naturally forming where the market is allowed to "compensate for the failure of the state", namely private arbitration, security guards, neighborhood watch groups and so on. These private courts and police are sometimes referred to generically as private defense agencies. The defense of those unable to pay for such protection might be financed by charitable organizations relying on voluntary donation rather than by state institutions relying on taxation, or by cooperative self-help by groups of individuals. Edward Stringham argues that private adjudication of disputes could enable the market to internalize externalities and provide services that customers desire.

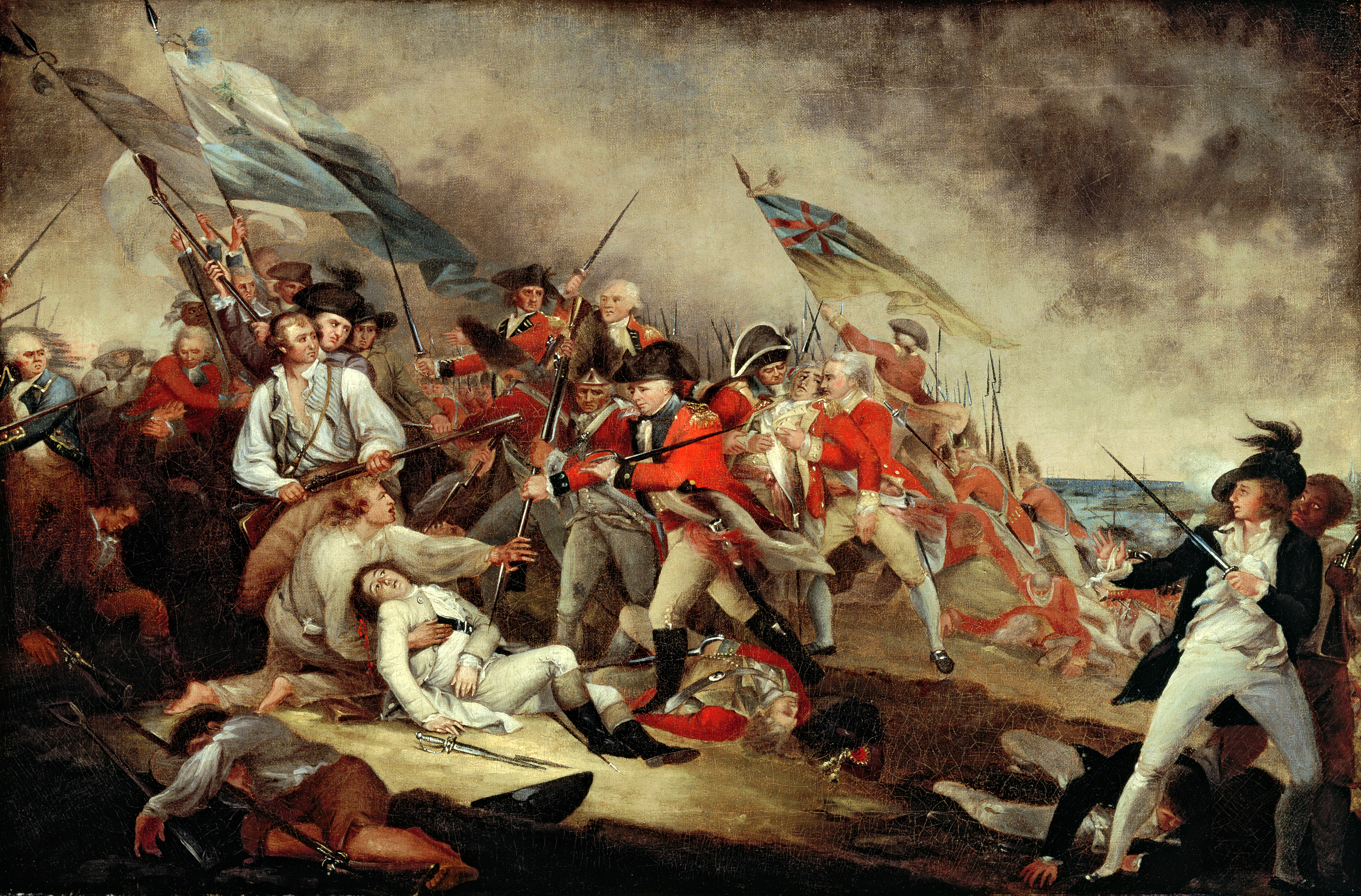
The death of General Joseph Warren at the Battle of Bunker Hill during the American Revolutionary War, a war that anarcho-capitalists such as Murray Rothbard admired and believed was the only American war that could be justified

Rothbard stated that the American Revolutionary War and the American Civil War were the only two just wars in American military history. Some anarcho-capitalists such as Rothbard feel that violent revolution is counter-productive and prefer voluntary forms of economic secession to the extent possible. Retributive justice is often a component of the contracts imagined for an anarcho-capitalist society. According to Matthew O'Keeffe, some anarcho-capitalists believe prisons or indentured servitude would be justifiable institutions to deal with those who violate anarcho-capitalist property relations while others believe exile or forced restitution are sufficient. Rothbard stressed the importance of restitution as the primary focus of a libertarian legal order and advocated for corporal punishment for petty vandals and the death penalty for murders.

American economist Bruce L. Benson argues that legal codes may impose punitive damages for intentional torts in the interest of deterring crime. Benson gives the example of a thief who breaks into a house by picking a lock. Even if caught before taking anything, Benson argues that the thief would still owe the victim for violating the sanctity of his property rights. Benson opines that despite the lack of objectively measurable losses in such cases, "standardized rules that are generally perceived to be fair by members of the community would, in all likelihood, be established through precedent, allowing judgments to specify payments that are reasonably appropriate for most criminal offenses."

Morris and Linda Tannehill raise a similar example, saying that a bank robber who had an attack of conscience and returned the money would still owe reparations for endangering the employees' and customers' lives and safety, in addition to the costs of the defense agency answering the teller's call for help. However, they believe that the robber's loss of reputation would be even more damaging. They suggest that specialized companies would list aggressors so that anyone wishing to do business with a man could first check his record, provided they trust the veracity of the companies' records. They further theorize that the bank robber would find insurance companies listing him as a very poor risk and other firms would be reluctant to enter into contracts with him.

Individualist market anarchist Laurance Labadie, the son of Benjamin Tucker's associate Joseph Labadie, criticized anarcho-capitalist Murray Rothbard for his support of free market private court system and opposition to Lysander Spooner's Jury nullification.

when Mr. Rothbard quibbles about the jurisprudential ideas of Spooner and Tucker, and at the same time upholds presumably in his courts the very economic evils which are at bottom the very reason for human contention and conflict, he would seem to be a man who chokes at a gnat while swallowing a camel.

=== Fraud and breach of contract ===
The problem is that, in most people's minds, "fraud" basically means misrepresenting the truth – i.e., lying. But clearly merely lying is not a rights violation. I think imprecise use of "fraud" permits it to be used to arrive at unlibertarian conclusions. It is imperative to understand it properly and to integrate it into libertarian theory in a way that is compatible with our notions of property and rights and aggression.

— Stephan Kinsella, The Problem with “Fraud”:

There is a debate among anarcho-capitalists about how to codify the concepts and standards for 'fraud' and 'breach of contract'. Mark D. Friedman notes that fraud does not easily fit under initiation of force or aggression, thereby not violating a literal interpretation of the non-aggression principle. He argues that libertarians cannot equate fraud to theft because in the case of fraud, it is still the victim's decision to entrust property to the perpetrator, even if was because of deceit. However, fraud may still be rendered unjust since the fraudster "intentionally prevents the agent from making a free choice". Benjamin Ferguson writes that virtually all libertarians have a standard of fraud, but while libertarians will typically invoke the power of a state to prohibit such acts, libertarians who are anarcho-capitalists may deny that prohibition of such immoral acts is enforceable by a state. Alternatively, they may take the weaker position that state-like collectives may be formed to enforce prohibitions, but the collective must dissolve once its purpose is fulfilled.

== Influences ==
The intellectual lineage of anarcho-capitalism draws significantly from the 18th-century French Physiocrats, such as Turgot and Mercier de la Rivière. They advocated for the "empire of nature and reason" over the arbitrary authority of the sovereign, popularizing the maxim "laissez faire, laissez passer". Their belief that "the world runs by itself" through a self-regulating natural order provided the early rationalist foundation for the claim that society can function harmoniously without state intervention.

Murray Rothbard has listed different ideologies of which his interpretations have influenced anarcho-capitalism. This includes his interpretation of anarchism, and more precisely individualist anarchism; classical liberalism and the Austrian School of economic thought. Scholars additionally associate anarcho-capitalism with neo-classical liberalism, radical neoliberalism and right-libertarianism.

=== Classical liberalism ===
Historian and libertarian Ralph Raico argued that what liberal philosophers "had come up with was a form of individualist anarchism, or, as it would be called today, anarcho-capitalism or market anarchism." He also said that Gustave de Molinari was proposing a doctrine of the private production of security, a position which was later taken up by Murray Rothbard. Some anarcho-capitalists consider Molinari to be the first proponent of anarcho-capitalism. In the preface to the 1977 English translation by Murray Rothbard called The Production of Security the "first presentation anywhere in human history of what is now called anarcho-capitalism", although admitting that "Molinari did not use the terminology, and probably would have balked at the name."

Ruth Kinna credits Murray Rothbard with coining the term anarcho-capitalism, which is – Kinna proposes – to describe "a commitment to unregulated private property and laissez-faire economics, prioritizing the liberty-rights of individuals, unfettered by government regulation, to accumulate, consume and determine the patterns of their lives as they see fit." According to Kinna, anarcho-capitalists "will sometimes label themselves market anarchists because they recognize the negative connotations of 'capitalism'. But the literature of anarcho-capitalism draws on classical liberal theory, particularly the Austrian School – Friedrich von Hayek and Ludwig von Mises – rather than recognizable anarchist traditions. Ayn Rand's laissez-faire, anti-government, corporate philosophy – Objectivism – is sometimes associated with anarcho-capitalism." Other scholars similarly associate anarcho-capitalism with anti-state classical liberalism, neo-classical liberalism, radical neoliberalism and right-libertarianism.

Paul Dragos Aligica writes that there is a "foundational difference between the classical liberal and the anarcho-capitalist positions." Classical liberalism, while accepting critical arguments against collectivism, acknowledges a certain level of public ownership and collective governance as necessary to provide practical solutions to political problems. In contrast anarcho-capitalism, according to Aligica, denies any requirement for any form of public administration, and allows no meaningful role for the public sphere, which is seen as sub-optimal and illegitimate.

=== Individualist anarchism ===
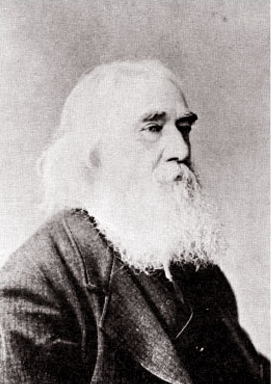
Lysander Spooner, an American individualist anarchist, who is claimed to have influenced anarcho-capitalism

Murray Rothbard, a student of Ludwig von Mises, stated that he was influenced by the work of the 19th-century American individualist anarchists. In the winter of 1949, Rothbard decided to reject minimal state laissez-faire and embrace his interpretation of individualist anarchism. In 1965, Rothbard wrote that "Lysander Spooner and Benjamin R. Tucker were unsurpassed as political philosophers and nothing is more needed today than a revival and development of the largely forgotten legacy they left to political philosophy." However, Rothbard thought that they had a faulty understanding of economics, while Rothbard was a student of Austrian School economics, he did not agree with their labor theory of value, their views on inflation, property rights and the wage system. Rothbard sought to meld 19th-century American individualist anarchists' advocacy of economic individualism and free markets with the principles of Austrian School economics, arguing that "[t]here is, in the body of thought known as 'Austrian economics', a scientific explanation of the workings of the free market (and of the consequences of government intervention in that market) which individualist anarchists could easily incorporate into their political and social Weltanschauung." Rothbard held that the economic consequences of the political system they advocate would not result in an economy with people being paid in proportion to labor amounts, nor would profit and interest disappear as they expected. Tucker thought that unregulated banking and money issuance would cause increases in the money supply so that interest rates would drop to zero or near to it. Peter Marshall states that "anarcho-capitalism overlooks the egalitarian implications of traditional individualist anarchists like Spooner and Tucker." Stephanie Silberstein states that "While Spooner was no free-market capitalist, nor an anarcho-capitalist, he was not as opposed to capitalism as most socialists were."

In "The Spooner-Tucker Doctrine: An Economist's View", Rothbard explained his disagreements. Rothbard disagreed with Tucker that it would cause the money supply to increase because he believed that the money supply in a free market would be self-regulating. If it were not, then Rothbard argued inflation would occur so it is not necessarily desirable to increase the money supply in the first place. Rothbard claimed that Tucker was wrong to think that interest would disappear regardless because he believed people, in general, do not wish to lend their money to others without compensation, so there is no reason why this would change just because banking was unregulated. Tucker held a labor theory of value and thought that in a free market people would be paid in proportion to how much labor they exerted and that exploitation or usury was taking place if they were not. As Tucker explained in State Socialism and Anarchism, his theory was that unregulated banking would cause more money to be available and that this would allow the proliferation of new businesses which would, in turn, raise demand for labor. This led Tucker to believe that the labor theory of value would be vindicated and equal amounts of labor would receive equal pay. As an Austrian School economist, Rothbard did not agree with the labor theory and believed that prices of goods and services are proportional to marginal utility rather than to labor amounts in the free market. As opposed to Tucker he did not think that there was anything exploitative about people receiving an income according to how much "buyers of their services value their labor" or what that labor produces.

== Precedents and examples ==
Several anarcho-capitalists and right-libertarians have discussed historical precedents of what they believe were examples of anarcho-capitalism.

=== Free Cities of Medieval Europe ===
Economist and libertarian scholar Bryan Caplan considers the free cities of medieval Europe as examples of "anarchist" or "nearly anarchistic" societies, further arguing:

One case that has inspired both sorts of anarchists is that of the free cities of medieval Europe. The first weak link in the chain of feudalism, these free cities became Europe's centers of economic development, trade, art, and culture. They provided a haven for runaway serfs, who could often legally gain their freedom if they avoided re-capture for a year and a day. And they offer many examples of how people can form mutual-aid associations for protection, insurance, and community. Of course, left-anarchists and anarcho-capitalists take a somewhat different perspective on the free cities: the former emphasize the communitarian and egalitarian concerns of the free cities, while the latter point to the relatively unregulated nature of their markets and the wide range of services (often including defense, security, and legal services) which were provided privately or semi-privately.

=== Medieval Iceland ===
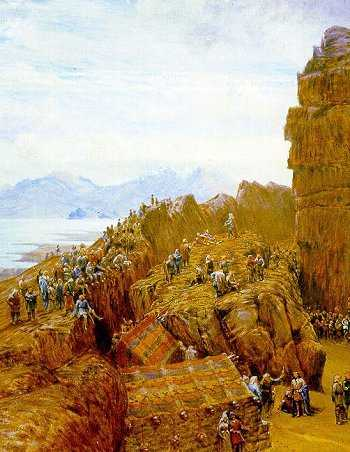
19th-century interpretation of the Althing in the Icelandic Commonwealth which authors such as David D. Friedman believe to have some features of anarcho-capitalist society

According to the libertarian theorist David D. Friedman, "medieval Icelandic institutions have several peculiar and interesting characteristics; they might almost have been invented by a mad economist to test the lengths to which market systems could supplant government in its most fundamental functions." While not directly labelling it anarcho-capitalist, Friedman argues that the legal system of the Icelandic Commonwealth comes close to being a real-world anarcho-capitalist legal system. Although noting that there was a single legal system, Friedman argues that enforcement of the law was entirely private and highly capitalist, providing some evidence of how such a society would function. Friedman further wrote that "[e]ven where the Icelandic legal system recognized an essentially 'public' offense, it dealt with it by giving some individual (in some cases chosen by lot from those affected) the right to pursue the case and collect the resulting fine, thus fitting it into an essentially private system."

Friedman and Bruce L. Benson argued that the Icelandic Commonwealth saw significant economic and social progress in the absence of systems of criminal law (which the Commonwealth actually had), an executive, or bureaucracy. This commonwealth was led by chieftains, whose position could be bought and sold like that of private property. Being a member of the chieftainship was also entirely voluntary.

=== American Old West ===
According to Terry L. Anderson and P. J. Hill, the Old West in the United States in the period of 1830 to 1900 was similar to anarcho-capitalism in that "private agencies provided the necessary basis for an orderly society in which property was protected and conflicts were resolved" and that the common popular perception that the Old West was chaotic with little respect for property rights is incorrect. Since squatters had no claim to western lands under federal law, extra-legal organizations formed to fill the void. Benson explains:

The land clubs and claim associations each adopted their own written contract setting out the laws that provided the means for defining and protecting property rights in the land. They established procedures for registration of land claims, as well as for the protection of those claims against outsiders, and for adjudication of internal disputes that arose. Reciprocal arrangements for protection would be maintained only if a member complied with the association's rules and its court's rulings. Anyone who refused would be ostracized. A boycott by a land club meant that an individual had no protection against aggression other than what he could provide himself.

According to Anderson, "defining anarcho-capitalist to mean minimal government with property rights developed from the bottom up, the western frontier was anarcho-capitalistic. People on the frontier invented institutions that fit the resource constraints they faced."

=== Gaelic Ireland ===
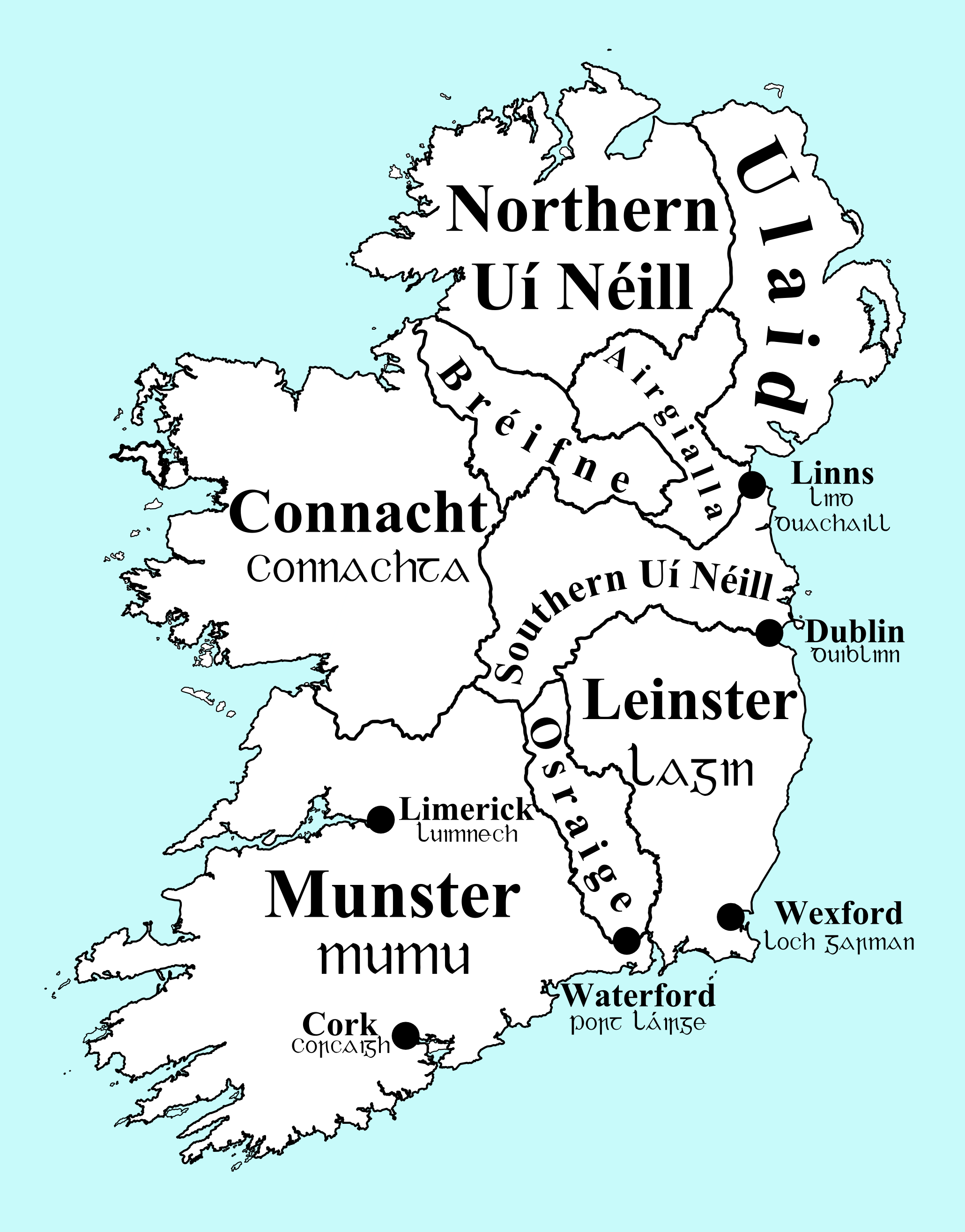
Provinces of Ireland in 900

In his work For a New Liberty, Murray Rothbard has claimed ancient Gaelic Ireland as an example of nearly anarcho-capitalist society. In his depiction, citing the work of Professor Joseph Peden, the basic political unit of ancient Ireland was the túath, which is portrayed as "a body of persons voluntarily united for socially beneficial purposes" with its territorial claim being limited to "the sum total of the landed properties of its members." Civil disputes were settled by private arbiters called brehons and the compensation to be paid to the wronged party was insured through voluntary surety relationships. Commenting on the "kings" of túaths, Rothbard stated:

The king was elected by the túath from within a royal kin group (the derbfine), which carried the hereditary priestly function. Politically, however, the king had strictly limited functions: he was the military leader of the túath, and he presided over the túath assemblies. But he could only conduct war or peace negotiations as an agent of the assemblies, and he was in no sense sovereign and had no rights of administering justice over túath members. He could not legislate, and when he himself was party to a lawsuit, he had to submit his case to an independent judicial arbiter.

=== Law merchant, admiralty law, and early common law ===
Some libertarians have cited law merchant, admiralty law and early common law as examples of anarcho-capitalism.

In his work Power and Market, Rothbard stated:

The law merchant, admiralty law, and much of the common law began to be developed by privately competitive judges, who were sought out by litigants for their expertise in understanding the legal areas involved. The fairs of Champagne and the great marts of international trade in the Middle Ages enjoyed freely competitive courts, and people could patronize those that they deemed most accurate and efficient.

=== Somalia from 1991 to 2012 ===
Economist Alex Tabarrok argued that Somalia in its stateless period provided a "unique test of the theory of anarchy", in some aspects close to that espoused by anarcho-capitalists David D. Friedman and Murray Rothbard. Nonetheless, many anarcho-capitalists argue that Somalia does not showcase their ideal system.

=== Argentina under Javier Milei ===
Javier Milei, elected as President of Argentina in 2023, has described himself as aligning with anarcho-capitalist thought, and has pursued major reductions in the size of the state through sharp cuts to public spending and deregulation since taking office.

== Analysis and criticism ==
=== Rights and freedom ===
Negative and positive rights are rights that oblige either action (positive rights) or inaction (negative rights). Strictly Rothbardian anarcho-capitalists believe that negative rights should be recognized as legitimate, but positive rights should be rejected as an intrusion. Some critics reject the distinction between positive and negative rights. Peter Marshall also states that the anarcho-capitalist definition of freedom is entirely negative and that it cannot guarantee the positive freedom of individual autonomy and independence. Anarcho-syndicalist and anti-capitalist intellectual Noam Chomsky argues that anarcho-capitalism would be highly oppressive rather than guaranteeing freedom:

Anarcho-capitalism, in my opinion, is a doctrinal system that, if ever implemented, would lead to forms of tyranny and oppression that have few counterparts in human history. There isn't the slightest possibility that its (in my view, horrendous) ideas would be implemented because they would quickly destroy any society that made this colossal error. The idea of "free contract" between the potentate and his starving subject is a sick joke, perhaps worth some moments in an academic seminar exploring the consequences of (in my view, absurd) ideas, but nowhere else.

American philosopher Jason Brennan, a supporter of anarcho-capitalism, argues that common anarcho-capitalist arguments based solely on citing the non-aggression principle fail, as they beg the question. A statist could argue that a state does not violate the non-aggression principle by collecting taxes, as the money rightfully belongs to the state. Similarly, a socialist could argue that to adhere to the non-aggression principle, capitalist property owners must relinquish their property to the public, as the capitalist property owners violate the principle by withholding property from its rightful owners. As such, a libertarian, statist, and socialist would agree on the non-aggression principle, but disagree on what constitutes aggression or who is the rightful owner of something.

=== Economics and property ===
Social anarchists argue that anarcho-capitalism allows individuals to accumulate significant power through free markets and private property. Friedman responded by arguing that the Icelandic Commonwealth was able to prevent the wealthy from abusing the poor by requiring individuals who engaged in acts of violence to compensate their victims financially.

Anarchists argue that certain capitalist transactions are not voluntary and that maintaining the class structure of a capitalist society requires coercion, which violates anarchist principles.

Some critics argue that the anarcho-capitalist concept of voluntary choice ignores constraints due to both human and non-human factors, such as the need for food and shelter, as well as active restriction of both used and unused resources by those enforcing property claims. If a person requires employment to feed and house himself, the employer-employee relationship could be considered involuntary. Another criticism is that employment is involuntary because the economic system that makes it necessary for some individuals to serve others is supported by the enforcement of coercive private property relations. Some philosophies view any ownership claims on land and natural resources as immoral and illegitimate. Objectivist philosopher Harry Binswanger criticizes anarcho-capitalism by arguing that "capitalism requires government", questioning who or what would enforce treaties and contracts.

Some right-libertarian critics of anarcho-capitalism, who support the full privatization of capital, such as geolibertarians, argue that land and the raw materials of nature remain a distinct factor of production and cannot be justly unrestricted because they are not products of human labor. Some socialists, including individualist anarchists and freed-market anarcho-mutualists who advocate market anarchism, adamantly oppose absentee ownership. Anarcho-capitalists have strong abandonment criteria, namely that one maintains ownership until one agrees to trade or gift it. Anti-state critics of this view posit comparatively weak abandonment criteria, arguing that one loses ownership when one stops personally occupying and using it, and that the idea of perpetually binding original appropriation is anathema to traditional schools of anarchism.

=== Anarchism ===
In both its social and individualist forms, anarchism is usually considered an anti-capitalist and radical left-wing or far-left movement that promotes libertarian socialist economic theories such as collectivism, communism, individualism, mutualism and syndicalism. Because anarchism is usually described alongside libertarian Marxism as the libertarian wing of the socialist movement and as having a historical association with anti-capitalism and socialism, anarchists believe that capitalism is incompatible with social and economic equality and therefore do not recognize anarcho-capitalism as an anarchist school of thought. In particular, anarchists argue that capitalist transactions are not voluntary and that maintaining the class structure of a capitalist society requires coercion which is incompatible with an anarchist society. The usage of libertarian is also in dispute. While both anarchists and anarcho-capitalists have used it, libertarian was synonymous with anarchist until the mid-20th century, when anarcho-capitalist theory developed.

Anarcho-capitalists are distinguished from the dominant anarchist tradition by their relation to property and capital. While both anarchism and anarcho-capitalism share general antipathy towards government authority, anarcho-capitalism favors free-market capitalism. Anarchists, including egoists such as Max Stirner, have supported the protection of an individual's freedom from powers of both government and private property owners. In contrast, while condemning governmental encroachment on personal liberties, anarcho-capitalists support freedoms based on private property rights. Anarcho-capitalist theorist Murray Rothbard argued that protesters should rent a street for protest from its owners. The abolition of public amenities is a common theme in some anarcho-capitalist writings.

As anarcho-capitalism puts laissez-faire economics before economic equality, it is commonly viewed as incompatible with the anti-capitalist and egalitarian tradition of anarchism. Although anarcho-capitalist theory implies the abolition of the state in favor of a fully laissez-faire economy, it lies outside the tradition of anarchism. While using the language of anarchism, anarcho-capitalism only shares anarchism's antipathy towards the state and not anarchism's antipathy towards hierarchy as theorists expect from anarcho-capitalist economic power relations. It follows a different paradigm from anarchism and has a fundamentally different approach and goals. In spite of the anarcho- in its title, anarcho-capitalism is more closely affiliated with capitalism, right-libertarianism, and liberalism than with anarchism. Some within this laissez-faire tradition reject the designation of anarcho-capitalism, believing that capitalism may either refer to the laissez-faire market they support or the government-regulated system that they oppose.

Rothbard argued that anarcho-capitalism is the only true form of anarchism – the only form of anarchism that could possibly exist in reality as he maintained that any other form presupposes authoritarian enforcement of a political ideology such as "redistribution of private property", which he attributed to anarchism. According to this argument, the capitalist free market is "the natural situation" that would result from people being free from state authority and entails the establishment of all voluntary associations in society such as cooperatives, non-profit organizations, businesses and so on. Moreover, anarcho-capitalists, as well as classical liberal minarchists, argue that the application of anarchist ideals as advocated by what they term "left-wing anarchists" would require an authoritarian body of some sort to impose it. Based on their understanding and interpretation of anarchism, to forcefully prevent people from accumulating capital, which they believe is a goal of anarchists, there would necessarily be a redistributive organization of some sort which would have the authority to in essence exact a tax and re-allocate the resulting resources to a larger group of people. They conclude that this theoretical body would inherently have political power and would be nothing short of a state. The difference between such an arrangement and an anarcho-capitalist system is what anarcho-capitalists see as the voluntary nature of organization within anarcho-capitalism contrasted with a "centralized ideology" and a "paired enforcement mechanism" which they believe would be necessary under what they describe as a "coercively" egalitarian-anarchist system.

Rothbard also argued that the capitalist system of today is not properly anarchistic because it often colludes with the state. According to Rothbard, "what Marx and later writers have done is to lump together two extremely different and even contradictory concepts and actions under the same portmanteau term. These two contradictory concepts are what I would call 'free-market capitalism' on the one hand, and 'state capitalism' on the other." "The difference between free-market capitalism and state capitalism", writes Rothbard, "is precisely the difference between, on the one hand, peaceful, voluntary exchange, and on the other, violent expropriation." He continues: "State capitalism inevitably creates all sorts of problems which become insoluble."

Anarchists reject the notions of law enforcment, capitalist wage system, hierarchies and private property. Albert Meltzer argued that anarcho-capitalism simply cannot be anarchism because capitalism and the state are inextricably interlinked and because capitalism exhibits domineering hierarchical structures such as that between an employer and an employee. Anna Morgenstern approaches this topic from the opposite perspective, arguing that anarcho-capitalists are not really capitalists because "mass concentration of capital is impossible" without the state. According to Jeremy Jennings, "[i]t is hard not to conclude that these ideas", referring to anarcho-capitalism, have "roots deep in classical liberalism" and "are described as anarchist only on the basis of a misunderstanding of what anarchism is." For Jennings, "anarchism does not stand for the untrammeled freedom of the individual (as the 'anarcho-capitalists' appear to believe) but, as we have already seen, for the extension of individuality and community." Similarly, Barbara Goodwin, Emeritus Professor of Politics at the University of East Anglia, Norwich, argues that anarcho-capitalism's "true place is in the group of right-wing libertarians", not in anarchism.

While both anarchism and anarcho-capitalism are in opposition to the state, they nevertheless interpret anti-statism differently. Austrian school economist David Prychitko, in the context of anarcho-capitalism says that "while society without a state is necessary for full-fledged anarchy, it is nevertheless insufficient." According to Ruth Kinna, anarcho-capitalists are anti-statists who draw more on right-wing liberal theory and the Austrian School than anarchist traditions. Kinna writes that "[i]n order to highlight the clear distinction between the two positions", anarchists describe anarcho-capitalists as "propertarians." Anarcho-capitalism is usually seen as part of the New Right.

=== Propertarianism ===
Critics charge that the propertarian perspective prevents freedom from making sense as an independent value in anarcho-capitalist theory:

Looking at Rothbard’s definition of "liberty" quoted above, we can see that freedom is actually no longer considered to be a fundamental, independent concept. Instead, freedom is a derivative of something more fundamental, namely the "legitimate rights" of an individual, which are identified as property rights. In other words, given that "anarcho"-capitalists and right libertarians in general consider the right to property as "absolute," it follows that freedom and property become one and the same. This suggests an alternative name for the right Libertarian, namely "Propertarian." And, needless to say, if we do not accept the right-libertarians’ view of what constitutes "legitimate" "rights," then their claim to be defenders of liberty is weak.

— Iain Mckay (2008/2012), Appendix: Anarchism and "Anarcho"-capitalism.

Matt Zwolinski has argued that scholars influenced by Rothbard could be called "propertarians" because the concept that really plays a central role in their research is property rather than liberty.

== Theoretical literature ==
Year	Title	Author(s)	Fully free text
1849	Production of Security	Gustave de Molinari	
1959	The Nature of Man and His Government	Robert LeFevre	
1962	Man, Economy, and State	Murray Rothbard	
1963	Limited Government- Hope or Illusion?	Robert Lefevre	
1963	Role of Private Property in a Free Society	Robert Lefevre	n/a
1969	The Death of Politics	Karl Hess	
1969	The Lawless State	Karl Hess	
1970	The Market for Liberty	Morris and Linda Tannehill	
1970	Power and Market	Murray Rothbard	
1973	The Machinery of Freedom	David D. Friedman	
1973	For a New Liberty	Murray Rothbard	
1977	Good Government: Hope or Illusion?	Robert LeFevre	
1979	Justice Entrepreneurship in a Free Market	George H. Smith	
1982	The Ethics of Liberty	Murray Rothbard	
1983	New Libertarian Manifesto	Samuel Edward Konkin III	
1988	An Agorist Primer	Samuel Edward Konkin III	
1988	A Theory of Socialism and Capitalism	Hans-Hermann Hoppe	
1990	The Enterprise of Law: Justice Without the State	Bruce L. Benson	n/a
1995	Economic Science and the Austrian Method	Hans-Hermann Hoppe	
1998	To Serve and Protect: Privatization and Community in Criminal Justice	Bruce L. Benson	n/a
2000	Law's Order: What Economics Has to Do with Law and Why It Matters	David D. Friedman	
2001	Democracy: The God That Failed	Hans-Hermann Hoppe	
2006	The Economics and Ethics of Private Property	Hans-Hermann Hoppe	
2006	Money, bank credit and economic cycles	Jesús Huerta de Soto	
2002	Chaos Theory	Bob Murphy	
2008	The Austrian School: Market Order and Entrepreneurial Creativity	Jesús Huerta de Soto	
2009	The Theory of Dynamic Efficiency	Jesús Huerta de Soto	
2010	Socialism, economic calculation and entrepreneurship	Jesús Huerta de Soto	
2013	The Problem of Political Authority	Michael Huemer	n/a
2020	Sobre el anarcocapitalismo	Miguel Anxo Bastos	

== See also ==
- Agorism
- Anarchist communism
- Consequentialist libertarianism
- Counter-economics
- Creative disruption
- Crypto-anarchism
- Definition of anarchism and libertarianism
- Market anarchism
- Neo-feudalism
- Natural-rights libertarianism
- Privatization in criminal justice
- Voluntaryism
