= Kidney trade in Iran =

Legal and government-regulated practice in Iran

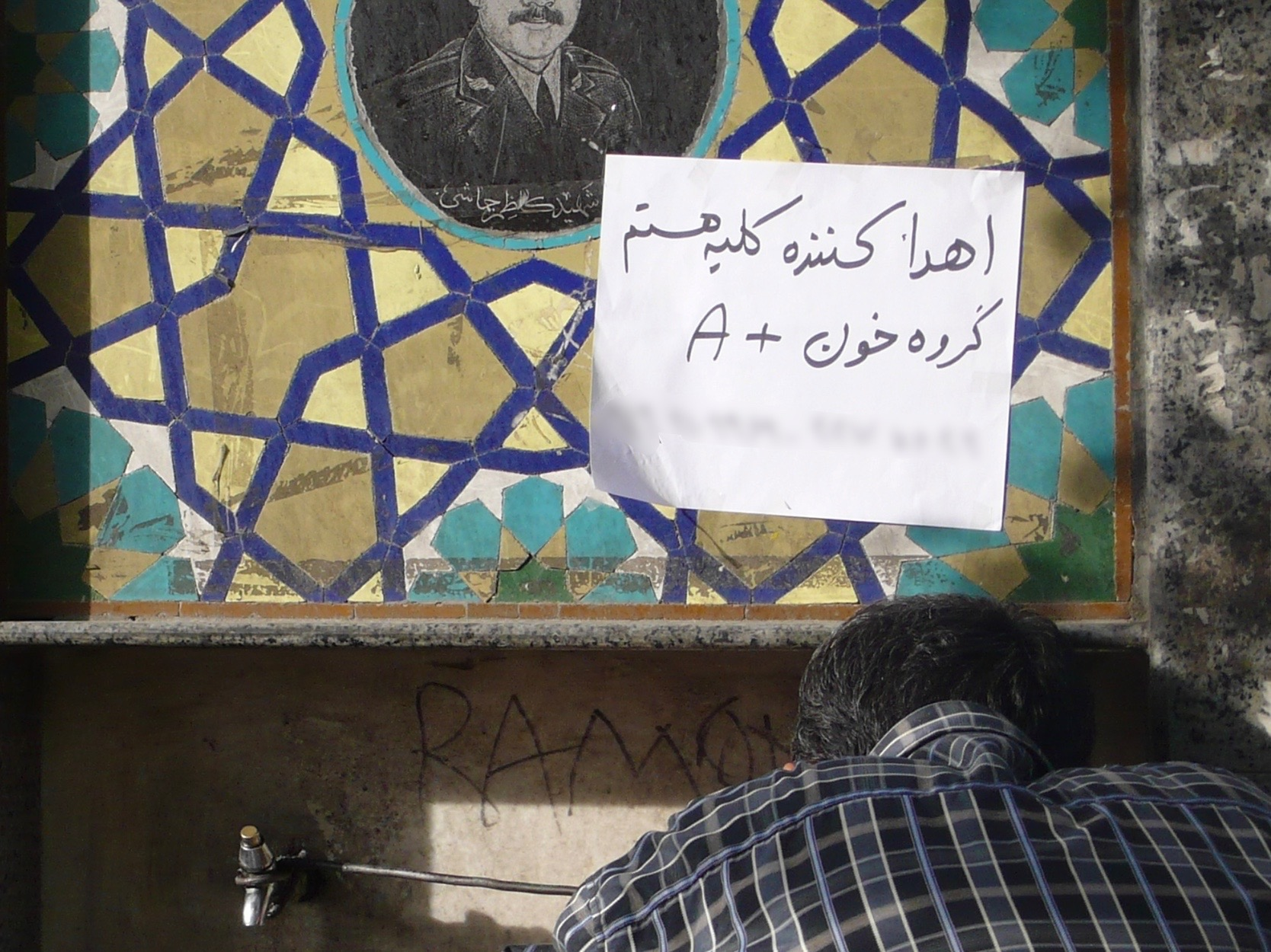
A sign in Iran saying "I am donating my kidney, Blood type A+" with a telephone number in Persian language

The practice of selling one's kidney for profit in Iran is legal and regulated by the government. In any given year, it is estimated that 1400 Iranians sell one of their kidneys to a recipient who was previously unknown to them. Iran currently is the only country in the world that allows the sale of one's kidney for compensation (typically a payment); consequently, the country does not have either a waiting list or a shortage of available organs.

According to an article in Clinical Journal of the American Society of Nephrology, the model has avoided many problems associated with organ trade but all models used in other developing countries have failed to slow down the worsening of transplant queues.

A study has shown motivations for donating are purely financial in 43% of cases and mainly financial with a minor altruistic component in another 40%. Of the donors, 76% agreed that kidney sale should be banned and if there was another chance they would prefer to beg (39%) or obtain a loan from usurers (60%) instead of vending a kidney. The goals of vending were achieved not at all by 75% of donors. However another study has been more positive, with 86.5% of donors reporting "complete satisfaction" prior to discharge, and only 1.5% reporting regret.

An examination of more than 600 advertisements posted on Telegram between late May 2026 and late October 2026 found that approximately 1/3 offered more than one organ or tissue (including testicles and corneas). Nevertheless, kidneys remains the most advertised organ, with 498 advertisements.

== Background ==
The first kidney transplantation in the Middle Eastern region was conducted in 1967 in Iran. It was not until the mid-1980s that these operations became commonplace. Iran allows kidney donations from both cadavers and compensated donors. Before the April 2000 law passed by parliament justifying the procurement of organs from those deemed clinically brain-dead, donor-compensated transplants represented over 99 percent of cases. It is now estimated that 13 percent of donations come from cadavers. Market proponents, such as the Cato Institute, claim that after financial incentives were introduced into the kidney market, Iran eliminated their transplant waiting list by 1999. However, a closer examination reveals that many Iranians afflicted with end-stage renal disease don't receive a diagnosis and aren't referred for dialysis, so therefore would never be eligible for a transplant. Ahad Ghods, from the Hashemi Nejad Kidney Hospital in Iran, claimed "This is the main reason that the renal transplant waiting list was eliminated quickly and successfully in Iran."

== Regulation ==
The model is organised through voluntary worker organizations. The receivers and the government pay for the donors. Charity organizations help those who cannot pay themselves.

The Charity Association for the Support of Kidney Patients (CASKP) and the Charity Foundation for Special Diseases (CFSD), under control of the Ministry of Health, regulates the trade of organs with the support of the government. The organizations match donors to recipients, arranging for tests to ensure compatibility. In order to prevent corruption or inequality “neither the transplant center nor transplant physicians are involved in identifying potential vendors” The amounts paid to the donor vary in Iran; however, the average figures are between $2,000 to $4,000 for a kidney donation. In contrast, a compatible kidney sold on the global black-market can cost in excess of $160,000 in some cases.

One payment option is the official contract, which gives the donor the US$1,219 (in 2001), and is paid immediately after the surgery. The kidney recipient may also negotiated with the donor by providing additional money or other benefits.

== Motivation for selling of kidneys in the Islamic Republic ==
Government officials acknowledge that people sell their kidneys because they need money. Money is needed to cover living expenses, support children and to cover debts. Trading in kidneys preys on the weakest and most desperate segments of Iranian society faced with ever increasing hardships. The trade is not limited to kidneys but encompasses the advertising and sale of liver, cornea, bone marrow, sperm, and ovum. Rising numbers of teenagers are selling organs in Iran amid the country’s worst ever economic crisis as young donors' healthy organs fetch high prices for desperate families. As poverty has become more widespread in Iran over the past few years, advertisements to sell and donate other body organs are also more common. Desperate Iranians have been going to fellow Islamic countries such as Iraq to sell their kidneys, and others are being led by middlemen to travel to the United Arab Emirates and Turkey to sell other body parts.

== Islamic views ==
In 1996, Islamic religious scholars from the Muslim Law Council of Great Britain issued a fatwa allowing the practice of organ transplants. However; as this decree allows donation to help save the life of another, it disallows acts of commerce, trade, or compensation in donations.

== Similar Middle-eastern models ==
In Saudi Arabia, transplants are performed using medicinal cadavers rather than living donors. The practice is sponsored and regulated by the government, through the Saudi Center for Organ Transplantation (SCOT). The organization is also responsible for the standards of care, public and formal education, regulations, and monitoring of all types of organ transplants. Because of the limited number of cadaver candidates, there are not enough donations to satisfy demand.

== See also ==
- Healthcare in Iran
- Organ trade
