= Polycentric law =

Theoretical legal structure

Polycentric law is a theoretical legal structure in which "providers" of legal systems compete or overlap in a given jurisdiction, as opposed to monopolistic statutory law according to which there is a sole provider of law for each jurisdiction. Devolution of this monopoly occurs by the principle of jurisprudence in which they rule according to higher law.

== Overview ==
Tom W. Bell, former director of telecommunications and technology studies at Cato Institute, now a professor of law at Chapman University School of Law in California, wrote "Polycentric Law", published by the Institute for Humane Studies, when he was a law student at the University of Chicago. In it he notes that others use phrases such as "non-monopolistic law" to describe these polycentric alternatives. He outlines traditional customary law (also known as consuetudinary law) before the creation of states, including as described by Friedrich A. Hayek, Bruce L. Benson, and David D. Friedman. He mentions specifically the Anglo-Saxon customary law, but also church law, guild law, and merchant law as examples of what he believes is polycentric law. He states that customary and statutory law have co-existed through history, as when Roman law applied to Romans throughout the Roman Empire, but indigenous legal systems were permitted for non-Romans. In "Polycentric Law in the New Millennium," which won first place in the Mont Pelerin Society's 1998 Friedrich A. Hayek Fellowship competition, Bell predicts three areas where polycentric law might develop: alternative dispute resolution, private communities, and the Internet.

The University of Helsinki funded a "Polycentric Law" research project from 1992 to 1995, led by professor Lars D. Eriksson. Its goal was to demonstrate "the inadequacy of current legal paradigms by mapping the indeterminacies of both the modern law and the modern legal theory. It also addressed the possibility of legal and ethical alternativies to the modern legal theories" and "provided openings to polycentric legal theories both by deconstructing the idea of unity in law and re-constructing legal and ethical differences". The project hosted two international conferences. In 1998 the book Polycentricity: The Multiple Scenes of Law, edited by Ari Hirvonen, collected essays written by scholars involved with the project.

Professor Randy Barnett, who originally wrote about "non-monopolistic" law, later used the phrase "polycentric legal order". He explains what he sees as advantages of such a system in his book The Structure of Liberty: Justice and the Rule of Law.

Bruce L. Benson also uses the phrase, writing in a Cato Institute publication in 2007: "A customary system of polycentric law would appear to be much more likely to generate efficient sized jurisdictions for the various communities involved—perhaps many smaller than most nations, with others encompassing many of today’s political jurisdictions (e.g., as international commercial law does today)."

John K. Palchak and Stanley T. Leung in "No State Required? A Critical Review of the Polycentric Legal Order," criticize the concept of polycentric law.

Legal scholar Gary Chartier in "Anarchy and Legal Order" elaborates and defends the idea of law without the state. It proposes an understanding of how law enforcement in a stateless society could be legitimate and what the optimal substance of law without the state might be. He suggests ways in which a stateless legal order could foster the growth of a culture of freedom, and situates the project it elaborates in relation to leftist, anti-capitalist, and socialist traditions.

== See also ==
- Anarcho-capitalism
- Autonomism
- Consociationalism
- Corporative federalism
- Governance without government
- Heterarchy
- Horizontalidad
- Indigenous law
- Legal pluralism
- Libertarian municipalism
- Ophelimity
- Panarchy
- Personal jurisdiction
- Pillarisation
- Voluntary association
- Voluntaryism
