= Randall G. Holcombe =

American economist (born 1950)

- Born: June 4, 1950 (age 76); United States

Academic background
- Education: Virginia Tech, University of Florida
- Influences: James M. Buchanan, Murray Rothbard

Academic work
- Discipline: Economics, Austrian School, public choice, Constitutional economics, public policy, entrepreneurship
- School or tradition: Austrian School
- Institutions: Florida State University
- Notable ideas: Public choice theory
- Website: Information at IDEAS / RePEc

Randall Gregory Holcombe (born June 4, 1950) is an American economist, and the DeVoe Moore Professor of Economics at Florida State University. He is a Senior Fellow at The Independent Institute, a Senior Fellow and member of the Research Advisory Council at The James Madison Institute, and past president of the Public Choice Society. From 2000 to 2006 he served on Governor Jeb Bush's Council of Economic Advisors.

Holcombe is the author of several books on economics and American politics. In libertarian theoretical discourse, he has argued that private defense agencies could form cartels and oppress people, more or less as governments, with little fear of competition.

Holcombe is a musician and licensed pilot.

== Bibliography ==
- Holcombe, Randall G., ed. (1999). The Great Austrian Economists. Auburn, Alabama: Ludwig von Mises Institute. ISBN 0945466048.
- Holcombe, Randall G. Political Capitalism: How Economic and Political Power is Made and Maintained. Cambridge University Press, 2018. ISBN 978-1-108-44990-8.
- Holcombe, Randall G. Coordination, Cooperation, and Control: The Evolution of Economic and Political Power. Springer International Publishing, Cham 2020. ISBN 978-3-030-48666-2, doi:10.1007/978-3-030-48667-9.
