= For a New Liberty =

1973 book by Murray Rothbard

For a New Liberty: The Libertarian Manifesto
- Cover of the first edition
- Author: Murray Rothbard
- Language: English
- Subject: Libertarianism
- Publisher: Macmillan Publishers
- Publication date: 1973
- Publication place: United States
- Media type: Print (Hardcover & Paperback)
- Pages: 327 (first edition); 338 (second edition)
- ISBN: 0-02-074690-3 (second edition); 0-945466-47-1 (2006 edition)
- OCLC: 75961482

For a New Liberty: The Libertarian Manifesto (1973; second edition 1978; third edition 1985) is a book by American economist and historian Murray Rothbard, in which the author promotes anarcho-capitalism. The work has been credited as an influence on modern libertarian thought and on part of the New Right.

== Summary ==
Rothbard advocates anarcho-capitalism, a strain of stateless libertarianism. Rothbard traces the intellectual origins of libertarianism back to classical liberal philosophers John Locke and Adam Smith and the American Revolution. He argues that modern libertarianism originated not as a response to socialism or leftism, but to conservatism. Rothbard views the right of self-ownership and the right to homestead as establishing the complete set of principles of the libertarian system.

The core of libertarianism, writes Rothbard, is the non-aggression axiom: "that no man or group of men may aggress against the person or property of anyone else." He argues that while this principle is almost universally applied to private individuals and institutions, the government is considered above the general moral law, and therefore does not have to abide by this axiom.

Rothbard attempts to dispel the notion that libertarianism constitutes a sect or offshoot of liberalism or conservatism, or that its seemingly right-wing opinions on economic policy and left-wing opinions on social and foreign policy are contradictory.

== Reception ==
The Objectivist author Peter Schwartz criticized the views Rothbard expounded in For a New Liberty, writing that like other libertarians, Rothbard cared about neither "the pursuit of freedom nor the exercise of reason" and supported only "the extermination of government and the inculcation of anti-state hostility." Schwartz maintained that Rothbard wrongly viewed the state as "by nature criminal." Libertarian author Tom G. Palmer commented in 1997 that For a New Liberty "provides a good overview of the libertarian worldview, although the chapters on public policy issues and on the organized libertarian movement are by now somewhat dated." Libertarian author David Boaz writes that For a New Liberty, together with Robert Nozick's Anarchy, State, and Utopia (1974) and Ayn Rand's essays on political philosophy, "defined the 'hard-core' version of modern libertarianism, which essentially restated Spencer's law of equal freedom: Individuals have the right to do whatever they want to do, so long as they respect the equal rights of others." British philosopher Ted Honderich writes that Rothbard's anarcho-libertarianism informed "one messianic part of the New Right".

In Radicals for Capitalism (2007), journalist Brian Doherty writes of For a New Liberty, "This book strove to synthesize, in condensed form, the economic, historical, philosophical, and policy elements of Rothbard's vision...the book was meant as both a primer and a manifesto, so Rothbard crammed in as much of his overall theory of liberty as he could ... Rothbard hits the harder anarcho-capitalist stuff, but slips it in so smoothly that many readers might not notice that this 'libertarian manifesto' promotes anarchism."

Philosopher Edward Feser argued that the central argument at the heart of the book is largely philosophically meaningless. Later, Professor Gerard Casey wrote a critical article about this, and they replied to each other.

Matt Zwolinski argued that the book's core content fails to make a clear case for freedom.

== Publishing history ==
In 2006 the Ludwig von Mises Institute released a new hardbound edition, with a new introduction by Lew Rockwell. There were also translations in Spanish, Italian, and Portuguese.

English

- Collier Macmillan. 1973. Hardcover. ISBN 0-02-605300-4
- Revised edition, Collier Books, 1978. Paperback
- Libertarian Review Foundation, New York, 1985, 1989 2nd Printing. ISBN 0-930073-02-9
- University Press of America. Paperback. 1986. ISBN 0-8191-4981-0
- Fox & Wilkes. 1989. Paperback. ISBN 0-930073-02-9
- Ludwig von Mises Institute. 2006. Hardcover. ISBN 0-945466-47-1

Spanish

- Hacia una Nueva Libertad: El Manifiesto Libertario. Grito Sagrado. 2006. Paperback. ISBN 987-1239-01-7

Italian

- 1996 Per una nuova libertà. Liberilibri, Macerata. 1996. Paperback.
- 2004 Per una nuova libertà. Liberilibri, Macerata. 2004. Paperback. ISBN 88-85140-27-0

Portuguese

- Por Uma Nova Liberdade O Manifesto Libertário. Instituto Ludwig von Mises do Brasil. 2013. Paperback. ISBN 978-85-8119-060-0

Ukrainian

- Ротбард, Мюрей. До нової свободи. Лібертаріанський маніфест / пер. з англ. Олександр Гросман, ред. Володимир Золотарьов, К. : К. І. С., 2022. — 427 c. Paperback. ISBN 978-617-684-270-5
