= The Market for Liberty =

1970 book by Linda and Morris Tannehill

- Cover of the hardback edition
- Author: Linda and Morris Tannehill
- Language: English, Spanish
- Subject: Anarcho-capitalism, natural law
- Publication date: 1970
- Publication place: United States
- Media type: Hardback, paperback, PDF
- ISBN: 0-930073-01-0
- OCLC: 69269

The Market for Liberty is a significant anarcho-capitalist book written by Linda and Morris Tannehill. It was preceded by the self-published Liberty via the Market in 1969. The work challenges statutory law and advocates natural law as the basis for society. It also argues that society would not be lawless in the absence of the state. The Market for Liberty outlines how different businesses and organizational structures would interact in a laissez-faire society and how these interactions would create checks which would ultimately keep the tendency for crime low. In keeping with radical free-market principles, the book is skeptical about the potential for violent anarcho-capitalist revolution to bring about good outcomes.

== Summary ==
=== Part I – The Great Conflict ===
Chapter 1, If We Don't Know Where We're Going..., notes the growing dissatisfaction among youth, the many problems society faces, and the need for a clear goal rather than just an adversary (e.g. the state). It claims that the authors are not advocating any type of utopia that depends on the infallibility of man in order to function. It contends that if the present system is brought crashing down without valid ideas having been disseminated about how society can function without governmental rule, people will demand a strong leader, and a Hitler will rise to answer their plea.

Chapter 2, Man and Society, argues that the nature of man is such that he must think and produce in order to live; and that in order to reach his full potential, he must have the right not only to do these things but to enjoy the rewards of his productive actions. It defines a laissez-faire society as one that "does not institutionalize the initiation of force and in which there are means for dealing with aggression justly when it does occur." It notes that only the possessor of a right can alienate himself from that right. If one does $100 of damage to a taxicab, for instance, then he alienates himself from his right to that $100. The cabbie then has a moral right to use force to collect it.

Chapter 3, The Self-Regulating Market, states that state interference causes the buyer, the seller, or both in a transaction to lose and that only a voluntary trade can be a completely satisfactory trade. It notes that markets clear; that taxation is economic hemophilia; regulation amounts to slow strangulation; that market monopolies can only attain and maintain monopoly status through excellence and low prices; and that without freedom of the market, no other freedom is meaningful. It criticizes the government for red tape which denies entrepreneurs opportunities to rise out of poverty.

Chapter 4, Government – An Unnecessary Evil, states that government is a coercive monopoly; that democratic governments decide issues largely on the basis of pressure from special interest groups; and that the notion of "a government of laws, not of men" is meaningless because laws must be written and enforced by men, and therefore a government of laws is a government of men. It argues that the eternal vigilance which is held to be the price of liberty is a constant non-productive expenditure of energy, and that is it grossly unreasonable to expect men to keep expending their energy in such a way out of unselfish idealism. It also argues that because of the danger of one interest group using the government to impose laws favoring itself or crippling its opponents, people are constantly in fear of different interest groups. Thus, blacks fear suppression by whites; whites worry about blacks gaining too much power; and any number of other groups, such as labor and management, urbanites and suburbanites, etc., are pitted against each other. Government is identified as a cause of strife. The checks and balances of government are also recognized as a source of waste that is no substitute for external checks such as competition. This chapter identifies many tools by which the government convinces people that government is necessary, such as state schools that brainwash the young into accepting pro-State ideas, investing government with tradition and pomp and identifying it with "our way of life." It also blames people for having a fear of self-responsibility.

=== Part II – A Laissez-Faire Society ===
Chapter 5, A Free and Healthy Economy, begins by noting the difficulties people have in picturing a society radically different from their own. It concludes that poverty would be better addressed by a laissez-faire society for many reasons, including the fact that unemployment is caused by the government, that untaxed businesses would have more profits to reinvest in productivity-enhancing technology, that private charities are more efficient than government, that parents would be more likely to avoid having excess children in the absence of social safety nets, etc. It argues that a plethora of choices in education would emerge in a free market. It also notes that the focus of media in a laissez-faire society would shift from covering government to covering business and individuals and that abuses would be checked by reporters looking for stories on aggression or fraud. The chapter argues that the quality of health care could be more efficiently kept at an adequate level through reputation, standards instituted by insurance companies, etc. It also discusses how currency could be provided without government.

Chapter 6, Property – The Great Problem Solver, argues that most social problems could be solved through an increase in the amount and type of property owned. It claims that taxation is theft and that regulation by initiated force is slavery. It argues that it should be possible to claim ownership over the ocean floor, the surface of other planets, corridors of airspace, radio wavelengths, and so on, by being the first to occupy them or otherwise clearly stake out territory. It also argues that all public property should be privatized in order to reduce crime and pollution.

Chapter 7, Arbitration of Disputes, argues that governmental arbiters are not necessary, since a man who agrees to the settlement of disputes by a third party and then breaks the contract would suffer harm to his reputation and be ostracized, thus solving the problem of noncompliance. It notes that the government's judges will tend to be biased in favor of government, since that is the entity from which they receive their salaries and power. It promotes the concept of insurance companies as a substitute for government as the institution used to pursue claims; in the event a person were defrauded, they could file a claim with their insurance company, and the insurer would obtain the right of subrogation. Insurers who, themselves, committed abuses would suffer loss of reputation and be at a competitive disadvantage to more reputable insurers.

Chapter 8, Protection of Life and Property, asserts that a person has the right to defend his life against aggression; and that he therefore has the right to defend his possessions as well, since they are the results of his investment of parts of his life and are, thus, extensions of that life. It notes, "Pacifism encourages every thug to continue his violent ways, even though the pacifist may devoutly wish he wouldn't (wishes don't create reality). Pacifistic behavior teaches the aggressor that crime does pay and encourages him to more and bigger aggressions. Such sanctioning of injustices is immoral, and because it is immoral, it is also impractical." It argues that self-defense is a personal responsibility, which one can fulfill by hiring an agent to protect him, such as a private defense agency. It distinguishes initiated force from retaliatory force, noting that the former is not a market phenomenon because it acts to destroy the market; but the latter is a market phenomenon because it restrains aggressors who would destroy it and/or exacts reparations from them. It notes that government creates a social environment which breeds crime through its prohibitions on gambling, prostitution, drugs, and so on. It argues that the main role of police is to protect the government, rather than the citizens. It contrasts the police with private defense agencies, which would focus on preventing aggression and whose officers would lack immunity for any offenses they might commit. It also notes that insurance companies might sell policies covering the insured against loss resulting from any type of coercion and that these insurers could bring unruly defense agencies to their knees through ostracism and boycotts. Yet, at the same time, the insurers would seek to avoid taking such action without cause, since it could be costly and result in boycotts against the insurer itself.

Chapter 9, Dealing with Coercion, argues that punishment in the form of eye for an eye vengeance does nothing to compensate the victim, and therefore opposes justice. It argues that an aggressor should repay the victim for his loss and for all expenses occasioned by the aggression, such as the cost of apprehending the offender. It further states that when an offender could not pay the restitution for a crime in his lifetime, the additional expenses could be paid by the insurance company.

Chapter 10, Rectification of Injustice, notes that some criminals of a particularly untrustworthy nature might need to work off their debt in workhouses. To insure against refusal to work, the reparations payments would be deducted from each pay before room and board costs, and those who refused to work would not eat or would have only a minimal diet. A variety of degrees of confinement would exist. The argument that the rich would buy crime is refuted by the argument that even a wealthy man could be killed in self-defense if he attempted a violent act and that he would risk his reputation as well.

Chapter 11, Warring Defense Agencies and Organized Crime, asserts the falsity of the assumption that government is necessary to prevent the initiation of force by arguing that government, as a coercive monopoly, must initiate force in order to survive. It notes several factors that would make a private defense agency avoid aggression. It would put itself at risk of retaliation and would lead its customers to fear that, in the event of a falling-out, it would turn its aggressive force against them. Moreover, insurers would consider the company to be a poor risk. Its employees would also be liable for any damages they caused, which would cause problems between the companies and its employees if it ordered unjustified attacks. It also speculates that a mafia-style agency would be unlikely to survive since there would be no black market to support it. The chapter argues that a tyrant would have more difficulty rising to power under a system of competing private defense agencies than under a governmental system, because customers oppressed by their company could simply switch to another company and obtain protection from the tyrant.

Chapter 12, Legislation and Objective Law, argues that free men, acting in a free market, would manage their affairs in accordance with natural law. It calls statutory law a clumsy, anachronistic, and unjust hindrance. It also argues that government judges have no market signals to guide their decisions, in contrast to free-market arbiters, who have profit and loss as a built-in correction mechanism.

Chapter 13, Foreign Aggression, notes that governments obtain the resources used for defense from the people, and those same resources can be used by private defense agencies to protect the people from aggression. It argues that governments aggravate or threaten other governments to the point of armed conflict and then coerce their citizens into protecting them. It notes that the ability of aggression insurers to pay claims would be enhanced by the limited damage resulting from the fact that foreign aggressors would need to use conventional warfare in wars of conquest to avoid destroying the property and slaves they seek to gain. It notes that in a laissez-faire society, there would be no government that could surrender to the enemy; defenders would fight as long as they perceived it was in their best interest.

Chapter 14, The Abolition of War, argues that government, not business, is responsible for the formation of the military–industrial complex. It notes that the burden of supporting wars falls heavily on business, since taxes are taken out of the pocket of the consumer. Moreover, businesses are a society's producers, and it is a society's producers who pay the bills. Business also suffers from wars because of the disruption of trade and the ruin and poverty that result. Government, however, gains from wars because it is left with more power, more money, and more territory. War also helps unite the people behind the government in the face of a "common enemy." The authors conclude that all that is needed to abolish war is to abolish government.

=== Part III – How Do We Get There? ===
Chapter 15, From Government to Laissez Faire, argues that first and foremost, the economy should be provided with media of exchange to replace the dollar. It states that possession of public property should be taken by individuals who, simply by clearly marking their claims, become the rightful owners. It argues against disposing of public property at auction, since bureaucrats would figure out ways to divert the proceeds into their own pockets, and the system would be biased toward the rich, many of whom obtained their wealth through political pull. The process of auctioning off the property would also prolong the politicians' power.

Chapter 16, The Force Which Shapes the World, argues that it is immoral to destroy the private property or life of an individual who has not aggressed against one. It argues that violent revolution is not only destructive, but actually strengthens the government. It also notes that a revolution's leaders could then become the next rulers. Because of the people's desire for a leader to get them out of chaos, the chapter opines that a violent revolution would pave the way for a new Hitler. This chapter calls for people to share ideas related to freedom, which can eventually lead to widespread non-cooperation with government.

== Reception ==
The book was the first significant anarcho-capitalist work to hit the libertarian movement, coming into print a year before Rothbard's Power and Market although Rothbard's book had been written earlier. According to Karl Hess, it has become "something of a classic." Mary Ruwart credits the Tannehill's book with winning her over to anarcho-capitalism. Doug Casey was also converted to anarcho-capitalism after reading the book at the behest of Jarret Wollstein. According to the Ludwig von Mises Institute, it was written just following a period of intense study of the writings of both Ayn Rand and Murray Rothbard.
