= Bruce L. Benson =

American scientist and author (born 1949)

- Born: March 18, 1949 (age 77); Havre, Montana, U.S.

Academic background
- Education: University of Montana, Texas A&M
- Influences: James M. Buchanan, David D. Friedman, Avner Greif, Murray Rothbard

Academic work
- Discipline: Economics, Austrian School, polycentric law, private law, commercial law, criminal justice, free-market environmentalism
- School or tradition: Austrian School
- Institutions: Florida State University
- Awards: Adam Smith Award
- Website: Information at IDEAS / RePEc

Bruce L. Benson (born March 18, 1949) is an American academic economist who is chair of the department of economics, DeVoe L. Moore Professor, distinguished research professor and courtesy professor of law at Florida State University and the recipient of the 2006 Adam Smith Award, the highest honor bestowed by the Association of Private Enterprise Education. He is a senior fellow at the Independent Institute and has recently been a Fulbright Senior Specialist in the Czech Republic, visiting professor at the university de Paris Pantheonon Assas, a Property-and-Environment-Research-Center Julian Simon Fellow, and visiting research fellow at the American Institute for Economic Research.

== Education ==
Benson received his Ph.D. from Texas A&M University in 1978.

== Publications ==
Benson is the author of four books, co-editor of another, author of over 125 peer-reviewed academic articles, author of over 65 chapters in edited books and has presented numerous scholarly papers. He has written some of the leading libertarian law and economics perspectives on regulation, criminalization, commercial law, and Native American law (see also: private law, polycentric law). His books include:

- American Antitrust Law in Theory and in Practice (with Melvin L. Greenhut), Aldershot, England: Avebury, 1989, 265 plus xiii pages.
- The Enterprise of Law: Justice Without the State, San Francisco: Pacific Research Institute for Public Policy, 1990, 397 plus viii pages (Award: 1991 Honorable-Mention Runner-up (among 5 finalists), Free Press Association "H. L. Mencken National Book Award.").
- The Economic Anatomy of a Drug War: Criminal Justice in the Commons (with David W. Rasmussen), Lanham, MD: Rowman and Littlefield, 1994, 265 plus viii pages.
- To Serve and Protect: Privatization and Community in Criminal Justice, New York: New York University Press, 1998, 372 plus xxvii pages; with a foreword by Marvin E. Wolfgang, director, Center for Studies in Criminology, University of Pennsylvania. Edited Series: "Political Economy of the Austrian School" series, Mario Rizzo, general editor (Award: The Atlas Economic Research Foundation's 2000 Sir Antony Fisher International Memorial Award recognizing "the institute that publishes a book ... in 1998 or 1999 that, in the opinion of the judges, made the greatest contribution to public understanding of the free economy" (book was written for the Independent Institute)).
- Justicia Sin Estado (Madrid: Unión Editorial, 2000) (Spanish translation of The Enterprise of Law: Justice Without the State, translated into Spanish by José Ignacio del Castillo and Jesús Gomez)
- Self Determination: The Other Path for Native Americans, an edited volume (co-edited with Terry Anderson and Tom Flannagan), Stanford University Press, 2006, 332 plus xv pages.
