= David D. Friedman =

American academic (born 1945)

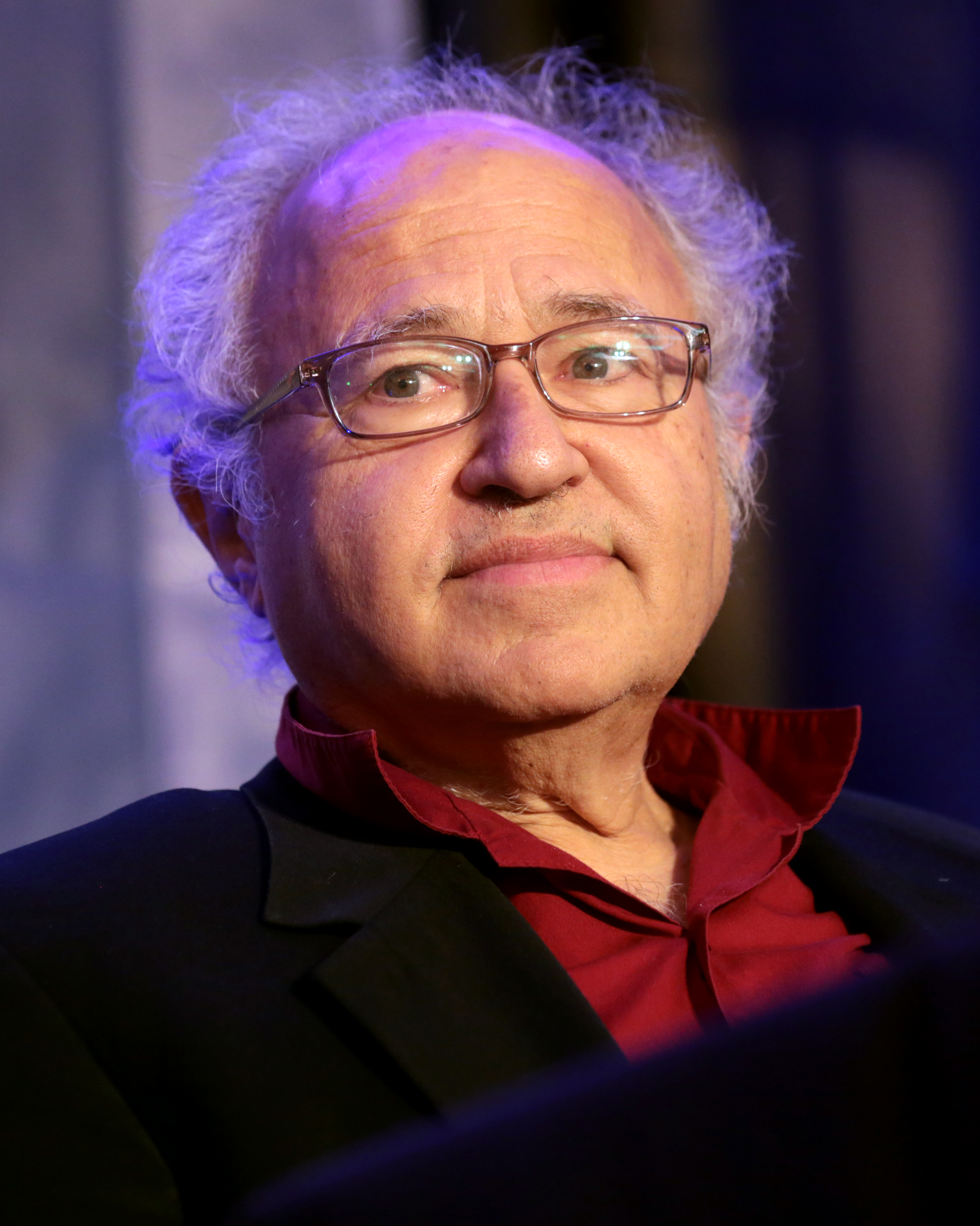
- Friedman in 2017
- Born: David Director Friedman; February 12, 1945 (age 81)
- Spouse: Elizabeth Cook
- Children: Patri Friedman
- Parents: Milton Friedman (father); Rose Friedman (mother)

Academic background
- Education: Harvard University (BA); University of Chicago (MA, PhD)
- Influences: Ronald Coase, Friedrich Hayek, Robert A. Heinlein, Milton Friedman, Rose Friedman, Adam Smith, Richard Timberlake, Alfred Marshall, Murray Rothbard

Academic work
- Discipline: Economics, law
- School or tradition: Chicago school of economics
- Institutions: Santa Clara University
- Notable ideas: The Machinery of Freedom; Consequentialist libertarianism
- Friedman's voice On capitalism vs. socialism
- Website: Official website; Information at IDEAS / RePEc

David Director Friedman (/ˈfriːdmən/; born February 12, 1945) is an American economist, physicist, and legal scholar. He is known for his textbook writings on microeconomics and the libertarian theory of anarcho-capitalism, which is the subject of his most popular book, The Machinery of Freedom. Described by Walter Block as a "free-market anarchist" theorist, Friedman has also authored several other books and articles, including Price Theory: An Intermediate Text (1986), Law's Order: What Economics Has to Do with Law and Why It Matters (2000), Hidden Order: The Economics of Everyday Life (1996), and Future Imperfect (2008).

== Life and work ==
David Director Friedman is the son of economists Rose and Milton Friedman. He graduated magna cum laude from Harvard University in 1965, with a bachelor's degree in chemistry and physics. He later earned a master's in 1967, and a PhD in 1971 in theoretical physics from the University of Chicago. Despite his later career, he never took a class for credit in either economics or law. He was a professor of law at Santa Clara University from 2005 to 2017, and a contributing editor for Liberty magazine. He is currently a professor emeritus. He is an atheist. His son, Patri Friedman, has also written about libertarian theory and market anarchism, particularly seasteading.

=== The Machinery of Freedom ===
In his book The Machinery of Freedom (1973), Friedman sketched a form of anarcho-capitalism where all goods and services including law itself can be produced by the free market. Friedman advocates an incrementalist approach to achieve anarcho-capitalism by gradual privatization of areas that government is involved in, ultimately privatizing the law itself. In the book, he states his opposition to violent anarcho-capitalist revolution.

He advocates a consequentialist version of anarcho-capitalism, arguing for it on a cost–benefit analysis of state versus no state. It is contrasted with the natural-rights approach as propounded most notably by economist and libertarian theorist Murray Rothbard.

== Non-academic interests ==
Friedman is a longtime member of the Society for Creative Anachronism, where he is known as Duke Cariadoc of the Bow. He is known throughout the worldwide society for his articles on the philosophy of recreationism and practical historical recreations, especially those relating to the medieval Middle East. His work is compiled in the popular Cariadoc's Miscellany. He is sometimes credited with founding the largest and longest-running SCA event, the Pennsic War; as king of the Middle Kingdom he challenged the East Kingdom, and later as king of the East accepted the challenge and lost (to himself).

He was a teenage wargamer who taught his school friend, Jack Radey, founder of People's War Games, how to play such wargames as Tactics II. Radey relates how Friedman and himself wrote to Charles S. Roberts claiming that they had found a first turn winning strategy for each of the two sides. Roberts replied that their interpretation of the rules was valid.

He is a long-time science fiction fan, and has written three novels. Harald (Baen Books, 2006) is set in an invented world drawn from European history. Salamander (2011) and its sequel Brothers (2020) are fantasy.

He has spoken in favor of a non-interventionist foreign policy.

== Bibliography ==
=== Nonfiction ===
- 1988. Cariadoc's Miscellany.
- 1990 (2nd ed.; 1st ed.: 1986). Price Theory: An Intermediate Text. Southwestern Publishing.
- 1996. Hidden Order: The Economics of Everyday Life. ISBN 0887308856.
- 2000. Law's Order: What Economics Has to Do with Law and Why It Matters. Princeton Univ. Press. ISBN 0691090092
- 2005. "The Case for Privacy" in Contemporary Debates in Applied Ethics. Wiley-Blackwell. ISBN 1405115483
- 2008. Future Imperfect: Technology and Freedom in an Uncertain World. ISBN 0521877326
- 2015 (3rd ed.; 2nd ed.: 1989; 1st ed.: 1973). The Machinery of Freedom. ISBN 978-1507785607
- 2019. Legal Systems Very Different from Ours. ISBN 1793386722

=== Fiction ===
- David D. Friedman (2006). Harald. Baen Books. ISBN 978-1416520566. OL 16070848W.
- Salamander, 2011
- Brothers, 2020
