= Morality and religion =

Relationship between religious views and morals

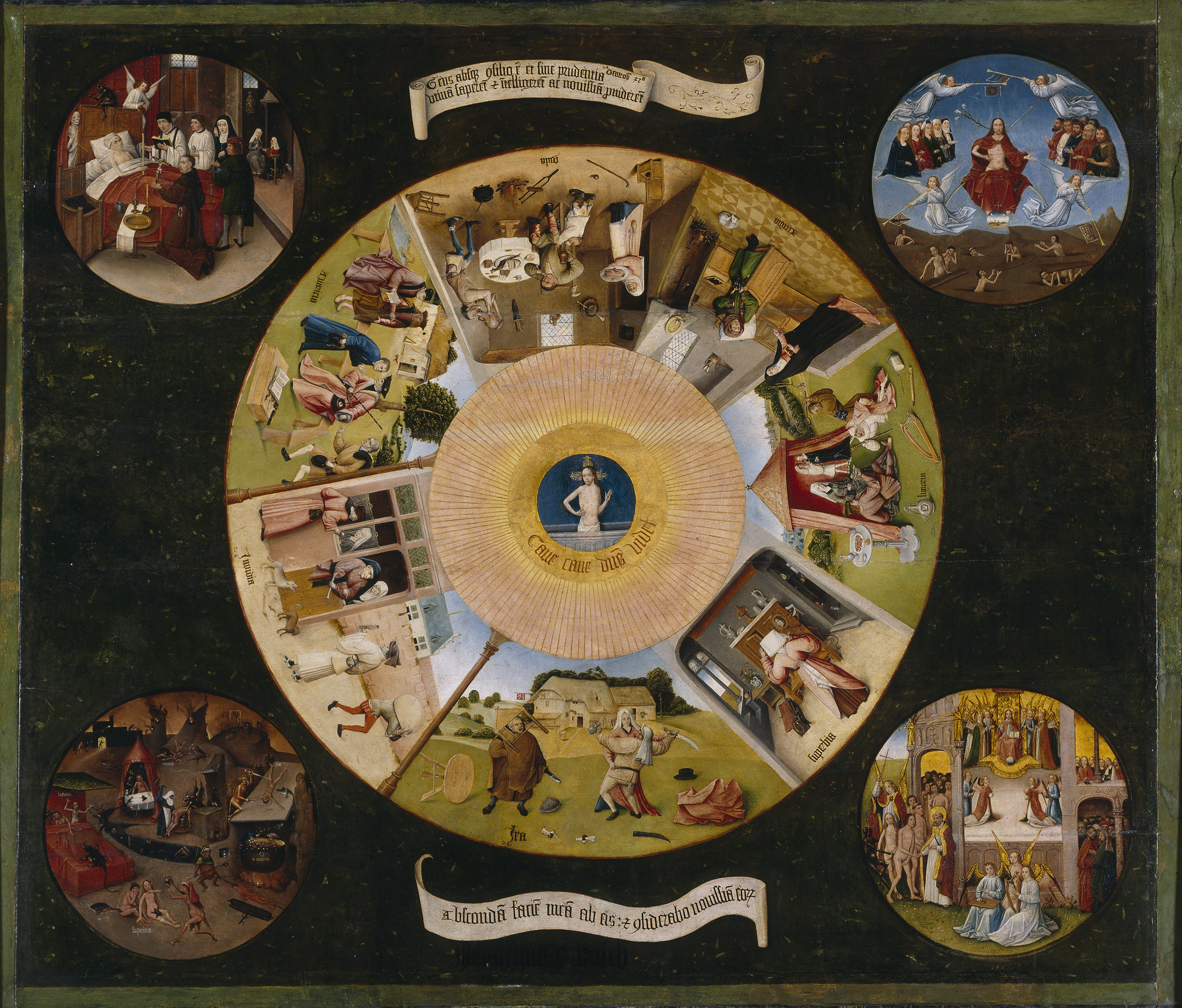
Hieronymus Bosch's The Seven Deadly Sins and the Four Last Things, a depiction of the seven deadly sins

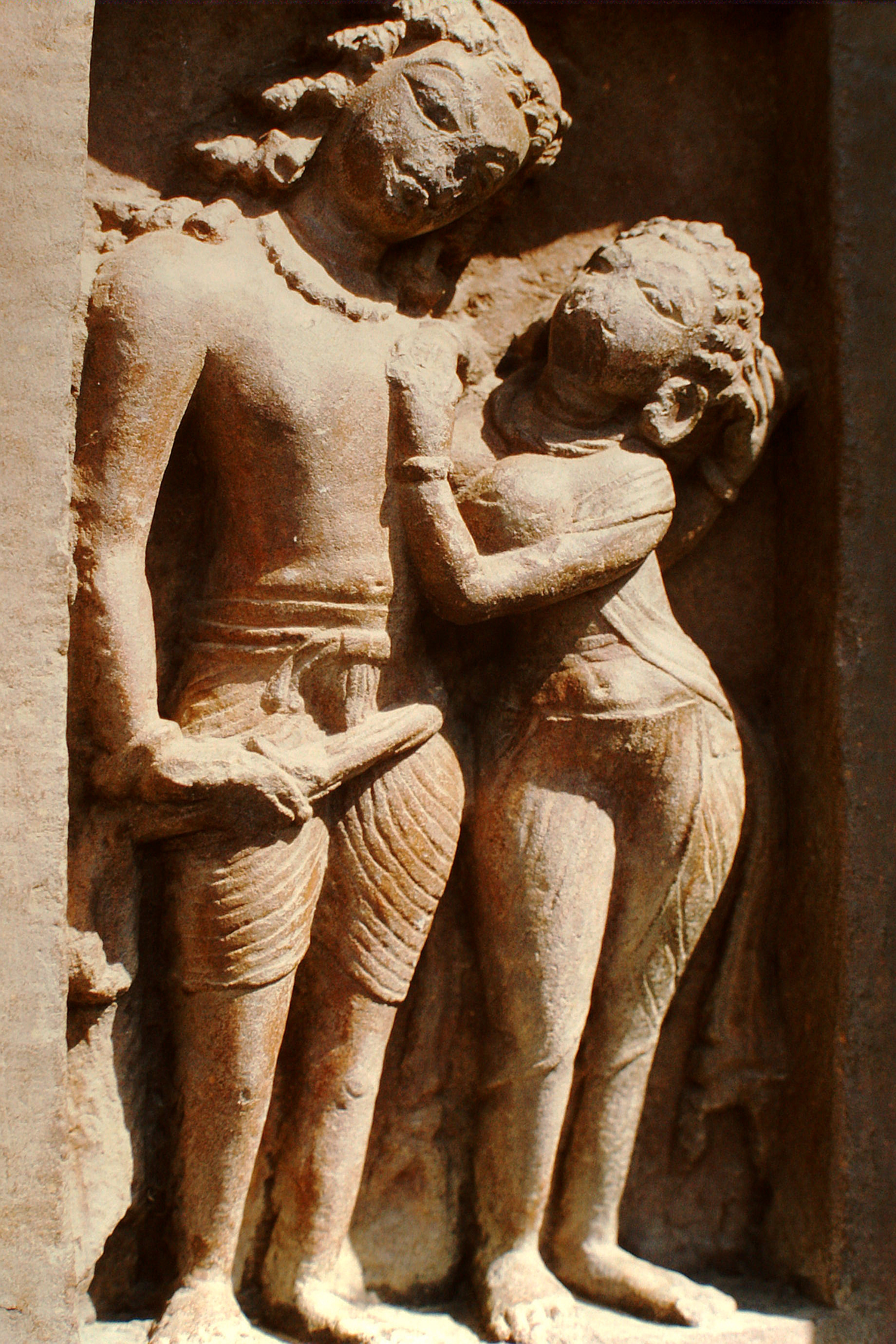
A sculpture depicting mithuna, a Sanskrit term for sexual intercourse in Tantric religion

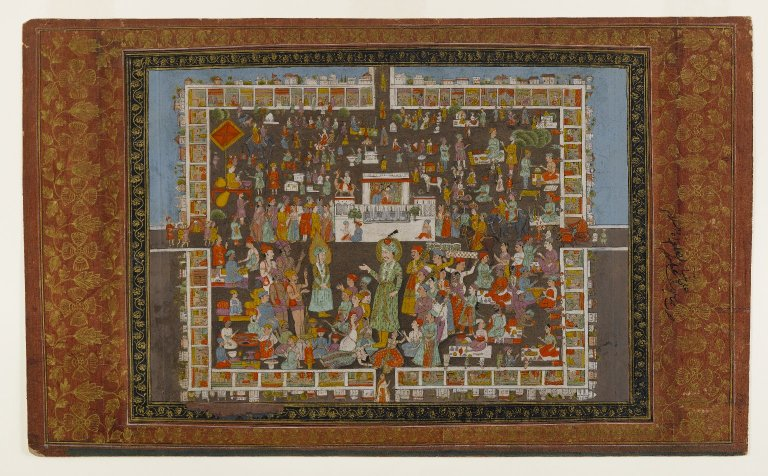
A depiction of Yusuf and Zulaikha, a story about the prophet Yusuf and Potiphar's wife common throughout the Muslim world, developed primarily from the account of surah 12 in the Qur'an

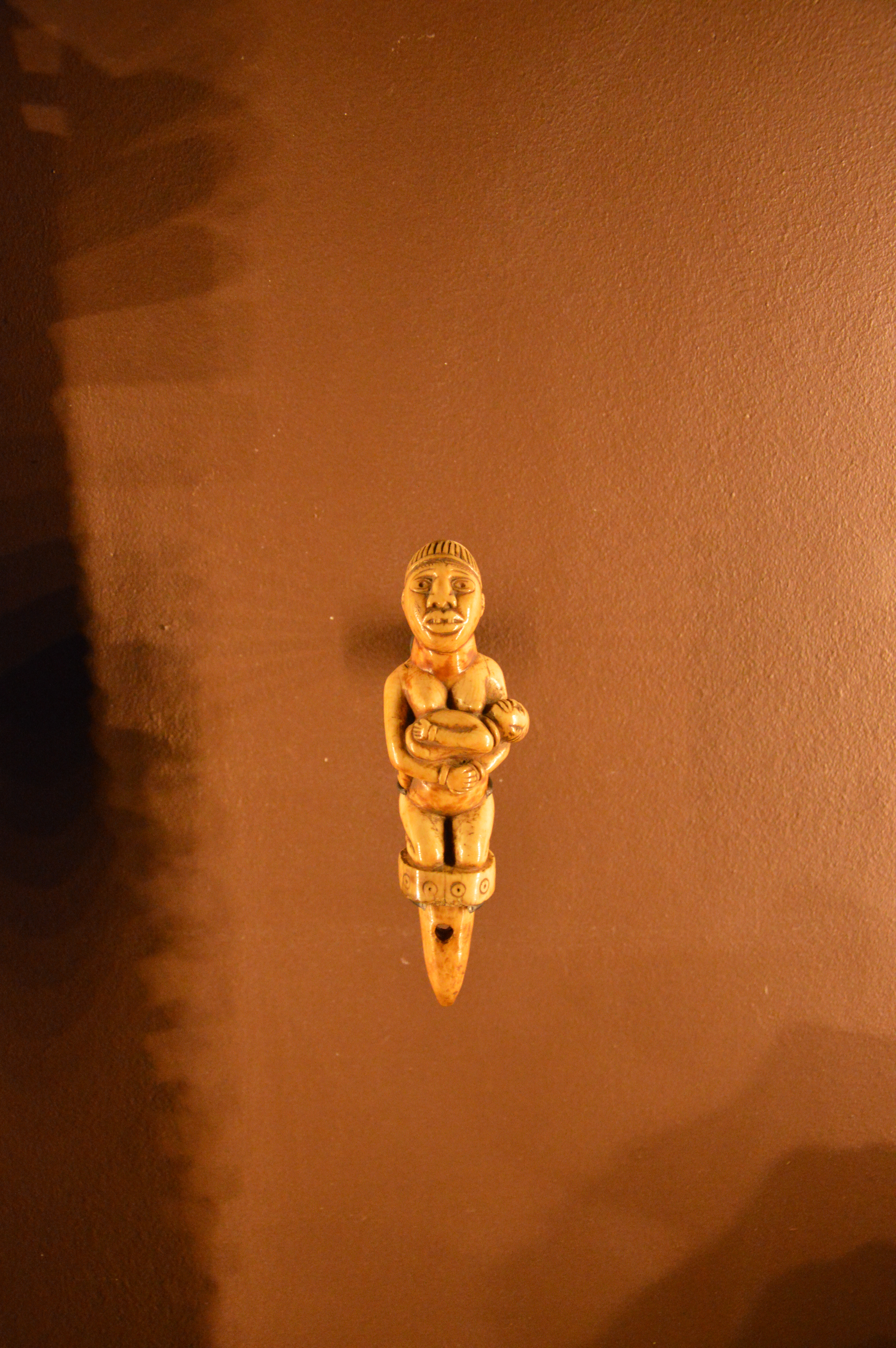
A phemba, or Yombe maternity figure, depicting a mother and her child

The intersections of morality and religion involve the relationship between religious views and morals. It is common for religions to have value frameworks regarding personal behavior meant to guide adherents in determining between right and wrong. These include the Triple Gems of Jainism, Islam's Sharia, Catholicism's Catechism, Buddhism's Noble Eightfold Path, and Zoroastrianism's "good thoughts, good words, and good deeds" concept, among others. Various sources - such as holy books, oral and written traditions, and religious leaders - may outline and interpret these frameworks. Some religious systems share tenets with secular value-frameworks such as consequentialism, freethought, and utilitarianism.

Religion and morality are not synonymous. Though religion may depend on morality, and even develop alongside morality, morality does not necessarily depend upon religion, despite some making "an almost automatic assumption" to this effect. According to The Westminster Dictionary of Christian Ethics, religion and morality "are to be defined differently and have no definitional connections with each other. Conceptually and in principle, morality and a religious value system are two distinct kinds of value systems or action guides." In the views of some, morality and religion can overlap. One definition sees morality as an active process which is, "at the very least, the effort to guide one's conduct by reason, that is, doing what there are the best reasons for doing, while giving equal consideration to the interests of all those affected by what one does."

Value judgments can vary greatly between and within the teachings of various religions, past and present. People in some religious traditions, such as Christianity, may derive ideas of right and wrong from the rules and laws set forth in their respective authoritative guides and by their religious leaders. Divine Command Theory equates morality to adherence to authoritative commands in a holy book. Religions such as Buddhism and Hinduism generally draw from some of the broadest canons of religious works. Researchers have shown interest in the relationship between religion and crime and other behavior that does not adhere to contemporary laws and social norms in various countries. Studies conducted in recent years have explored these relationships, but the results have been mixed and sometimes contradictory. The ability of religious faiths to provide useful and consistent value frameworks remains a matter of some debate. Some religious commentators have asserted that one cannot lead a moral life without an absolute lawgiver as a guide. Other observers assert that moral behavior does not rely on religious tenets, and/or that moral guidelines vary over time and space rather than remain absolute, and secular commentators (such as Christopher Hitchens) point to ethical challenges within various religions that conflict with contemporary social norms.

== Relationship between religion and morality ==
Within the wide range of ethical traditions, religious traditions co-exist with secular value frameworks such as humanism, utilitarianism, and others. There are many types of religious values. Modern monotheistic religions, such as Islam, Judaism, Christianity (and to a certain degree others such as Sikhism) define right and wrong by the laws and rules set forth by their respective gods and as interpreted by religious leaders within the respective faith. Polytheistic religious traditions tend to be less absolute. For example, within Buddhism, the intention of the individual and the circumstances play roles in determining whether an action is right or wrong. Barbara Stoler Miller points out a further disparity between the morals of religious traditions, stating that in Hinduism, "practically, right and wrong are decided according to the categories of social rank, kinship, and stages of life. For modern Westerners, who have been raised on ideals of universality and egalitarianism, this relativity of values and obligations is the aspect of Hinduism most difficult to understand."

According to Stephen Gaukroger: "It was generally assumed in the 17th century that religion provided the unique basis for morality, and that without religion, there could be no morality." This view slowly shifted over time. In 1690, Pierre Bayle asserted that religion "is neither necessary nor sufficient for morality". Modern sources separate the two concepts. For example, The Westminster Dictionary of Christian Ethics says that,

For many religious people, morality and religion are the same or inseparable; for them either morality is part of religion or their religion is their morality. For others, especially for nonreligious people, morality and religion are distinct and separable; religion may be immoral or nonmoral, and morality may or should be nonreligious. Even for some religious people the two are different and separable; they may hold that religion should be moral and morality should be, but they agree that they may not be.

Richard Paula and Linda Elder of the Foundation for Critical Thinking assert that, "Most people confuse ethics with behaving in accordance with social conventions, religious beliefs, and the law." They separate the concept of ethics from these topics, stating:

The proper role of ethical reasoning is to highlight acts of two kinds: those which enhance the well-being of others—that warrant our praise—and those that harm or diminish the well-being of others—and thus warrant our criticism.

They note problems that could arise if religions defined ethics, such as:

1. religious practices like "torturing unbelievers or burning them alive" potentially being labeled "ethical"
2. the lack of a common religious baseline across humanity because religions provide different theological definitions for the idea of sin

They further note that various documents, such as the UN Declaration of Human Rights lay out "transcultural" and "trans-religious" ethical concepts and principles—such as slavery, genocide, torture, sexism, racism, murder, assault, fraud, deceit, and intimidation—which require no reliance on religion (or social convention) for us to understand they are "ethically wrong".

Armin Geertz suggests that "the age-old assumption that religion produces morals and values is neither the only, nor the most parsimonious, hypothesis for religion".

== Religious frameworks ==
Religions provide different ways of dealing with moral dilemmas. For example, there is no absolute prohibition on killing in Hinduism, which recognizes that it "may be inevitable and indeed necessary" in certain circumstances. Christian traditions view certain acts - such as abortion or divorce - in more absolute terms. In the case of divorce, a 2008 study by the Barna Group found that some denominations have a significantly higher divorce-rate than those in non-religious demographic groups (atheists and agnostics). However, Catholics and Evangelical Christians had the lowest divorce-rates and the agnostic/atheist group had by far the lowest number of married couples to begin with.

According to Thomas Dixon, "Many today ... argue that religious beliefs are necessary to provide moral guidance and standards of virtuous conduct in an otherwise corrupt, materialistic, and degenerate world." In the same vein, Christian theologian Ron Rhodes has remarked that "it is impossible to distinguish evil from good unless one has an infinite reference point which is absolutely good". Thomas Dixon states, "Religions certainly do provide a framework within which people can learn the difference between right and wrong."

Religions provide various methods for publicising, announcing and condemning the moral duties and decisions of individuals. A priestly caste may adopt the role of moral guardians. Sometimes religious and state authorities work well in tandem to police morals, as in the case of god-kings, in medieval Europe or in colonial Massachusetts. But priesthoods may become dependent on secular authorities (a form of Caesaropapism) to promulgate and punish; or priests may come to concentrate on important ritual or ceremony and leave open the way for external preachers of moral revival - such as prophets in Judaism, Muhammad in Arabia, or Puritans and non-conformists in England. Priesthoods may over time develop traditional or geographical inconsistencies in their moral teaching - with the possibility of religious innovators becoming heresiarchs and splitting off into various sects. In this sort of situation a written moral code (perhaps as part of sacred scriptures) may provide useful (even if sometimes inflexible) standardisation. The interpretation of such written codes may devolve onto the likes of Christian canon lawyers or an Islamic ulama. Overall, the individual believer associated with a well-developed religion may have relatively little room left to make personal moral choices.

== Religion and social dimensions ==
The study of religion and morality is contentious due to conceptual differences. The ethnocentric views on morality, failure to distinguish between in group and out group altruism, and inconsistent definition of religiosity all contribute to conflicting findings. Membership of a religious group can accentuate biases in behavior toward in group versus out group members, which may explain the lower number of interracial friends and greater approval of torture among church members. Furthermore, some studies have shown that religious prosociality is primarily motivated by wanting to appear prosocial, which may be related to the desire to further ones religious group. The egoistically motivated prosociality may also affect self-reports, resulting in biased results. Peer ratings can be biased by stereotypes, and indications of a person's group affiliation are sufficient to bias reporting.

In line with other findings suggesting that religious humanitarianism is largely directed at in-group members, greater religious identification, greater extrinsic religiosity and greater religious fundamentalism were associated with racial prejudice. This is congruent with the fact that 50% of religious congregations in the US are racially segregated, and only 12% have a degree of diversity.

According to global research done by Gallup on people from 145 countries, adherents of all the major world religions who attended religious services in the past week reported higher rates of generosity such as donating money, volunteering, and helping a stranger than do their coreligionists who did not attend services (non-attenders). Even for people who were nonreligious, those who said they attended religious services in the past week exhibited more generous behaviors. Another global study by Gallup on people from 140 countries showed that highly religious people are more likely to help others in terms of donating money, volunteering, and helping strangers despite them having, on average, lower incomes than those who are less religious or nonreligious.

One study on pro-social sentiments showed that non-religious people were more inclined to show generosity in random acts of kindness, such as lending their possessions and offering a seat on a crowded bus or train. Religious people were less inclined when it came to seeing how much compassion motivated participants to be charitable in other ways, such as in giving money or food to a homeless person and to non-believers.

A study found that religious people were more charitable than their irreligious counterparts. The study revealed that forty percent of worship service attending Americans volunteered regularly to help the poor and elderly as opposed to 15% of Americans who never attend services. Moreover, religious individuals were more likely than non-religious individuals to volunteer for school and youth programs (36% vs. 15%), a neighborhood or civic group (26% vs. 13%), and for health care (21% vs. 13%). Other research has shown similar correlations between religiosity and giving.

Some scientific studies show that the degree of religiosity is generally associated with higher ethical attitudes—for example, surveys suggesting a positive connection between faith and altruism.

The overall relationship between faith and crime is unclear. A 2001 review of studies on this topic found "The existing evidence surrounding the effect of religion on crime is varied, contested, and inconclusive, and currently no persuasive answer exists as to the empirical relationship between religion and crime." Dozens of studies have been conducted on this topic since the twentieth century. A 2005 study by Gregory S. Paul argues for a positive correlation between the degree of public religiosity in a society and certain measures of dysfunction, however, an analysis published later in the same journal contends that a number of methodological and theoretical problems undermine any findings or conclusions taken from Paul's research. In another response, Gary Jensen builds on and refines Paul's study. His conclusion is that a "complex relationship" exists between religiosity and homicide "with some dimensions of religiosity encouraging homicide and other dimensions discouraging it".

Some works indicate that some societies with lower religiosity have lower crime rates—especially violent crime, compared to some societies with higher religiosity. Phil Zuckerman notes that Denmark and Sweden, "which are probably the least religious countries in the world, and possibly in the history of the world," enjoy "among the lowest violent crime rates in the world [and] the lowest levels of corruption in the world." However, Zuckerman noted that none of these correlations mean that atheism and non-religiosity cause social well-being, instead existential security is what allows for atheism and non-religion to thrive in these societies.

Modern research in criminology also acknowledges an inverse relationship between religion and crime, with some studies establishing this connection. A meta-analysis of 60 studies on religion and crime concluded, "religious behaviors and beliefs exert a moderate deterrent effect on individuals' criminal behavior". However, in his books about the materialism in America's Evangelical Churches Ron Sider accuses fellow Christians of failing to do better than their secular counterparts in the percentage adhering to widely held moral standards (e.g., lying, theft and sexual infidelity).

A Georgia State University study published in the academic journal Theoretical Criminology suggests that religion helps criminals to justify their crimes and might "encourage" it. The research concluded that "many street offenders anticipate an early death, making them less prone to delay gratification, more likely to discount the future costs of crime, and thus more likely to offend".

== Criticism of religious values ==
Religious values can diverge from commonly held contemporary moral positions, such as those on murder, mass atrocities, and slavery. For example, Simon Blackburn states that "apologists for Hinduism defend or explain away its involvement with the caste system, and apologists for Islam defend or explain away its harsh penal code or its attitude to women and infidels". In regard to Christianity, he states that the "Bible can be read as giving us a carte blanche for harsh attitudes to children, the mentally handicapped, animals, the environment, the divorced, unbelievers, people with various sexual habits, and elderly women". He provides examples such as the phrase in Exodus 22:18 that has "helped to burn alive tens or hundreds of thousands of women in Europe and America": "Thou shalt not suffer a witch to live," and notes that the Old Testament God apparently has "no problems with a slave-owning society", considers birth control a crime punishable by death, and "is keen on child abuse". Blackburn notes morally suspect themes in the Bible's New Testament as well.

Philosopher David Hume stated that, "The greatest crimes have been found, in many instances, to be compatible with a superstitious piety and devotion; Hence it is justly regarded as unsafe to draw any inference in favor of a man's morals, from the fervor or strictness of his religious exercises, even though he himself believe them sincere."

Bertrand Russell said, "There are also, in most religions, specific ethical tenets which do definite harm. The Catholic condemnation of birth control, if it could prevail, would make the mitigation of poverty and the abolition of war impossible. The Hindu beliefs that the cow is a sacred animal and that it is wicked for widows to remarry cause quite needless suffering." He asserts that

You find this curious fact, that the more intense has been the religion of any period and the more profound has been the dogmatic belief, the greater has been the cruelty and the worse has been the state of affairs....You find as you look around the world that every single bit of progress in humane feeling, every improvement in the criminal law, every step toward the diminution of war, every step toward better treatment of the colored races, or every mitigation of slavery, every moral progress that there has been in the world, has been consistently opposed by the organized churches of the world.

According to Paul Copan, Jewish laws in the Bible show an evolution of moral standards towards protecting the vulnerable, imposing a death penalty on those pursuing forced slavery and identifying slaves as persons and not property.

According to Bertrand Russell, "Clergymen almost necessarily fail in two ways as teachers of morals. They condemn acts which do no harm and they condone acts which do great harm." He cites an example of a clergyman who was warned by a physician that his wife would die if she had another (her tenth) child, but impregnated her regardless, which resulted in her death. "No one condemned him; he retained his benefice and married again. So long as clergymen continue to condone cruelty and condemn 'innocent' pleasure, they can only do harm as guardians of the morals of the young."

Russell further states that, "The sense of sin which dominates many children and young people and often lasts on into later life is a misery and a source of distortion that serves no useful purpose of any sort or kind." Russel allows that religious sentiments have, historically, sometimes led to morally acceptable behavior, but asserts that, "in the present day, [1954] such good as might be done by imputing a theological origin to morals is inextricably bound up with such grave evils that the good becomes insignificant in comparison."

== Secular morality ==
All the world's major religions, with their emphasis on love, compassion, patience, tolerance, and forgiveness can and do promote inner values. But the reality of the world today is that grounding ethics in religion is no longer adequate. This is why I am increasingly convinced that the time has come to find a way of thinking about spirituality and ethics beyond religion altogether.

— The 14th Dalai Lama, Tenzin Gyatso, 10 September 2012

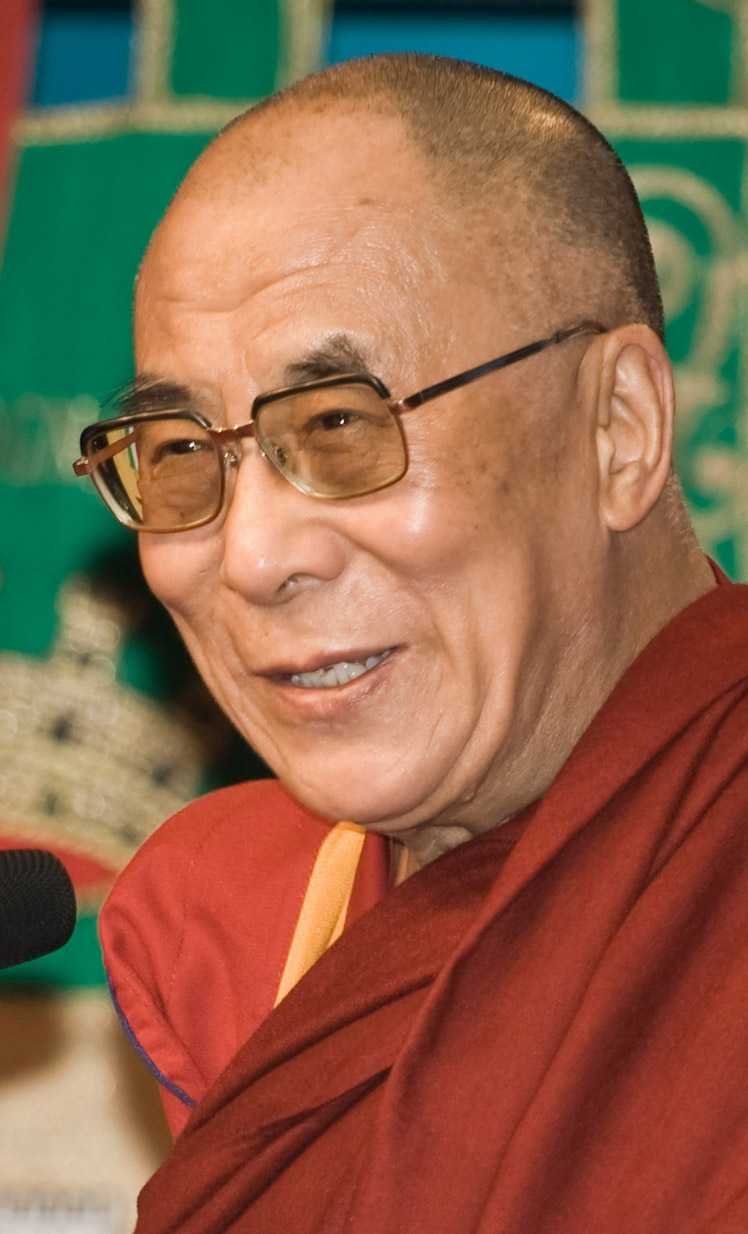
The 14th Dalai Lama, Tenzin Gyatso in 2007

There are number of secular value frameworks, such as consequentialism, freethought, humanism, and utilitarianism. Yet, there have been opposing views about the ability of both religious and secular moral frameworks to provide useful guides to right and wrong actions.

Morality does not need to be based upon religious authority; however, it should be based on the well-being of others, cultural values, and human reasoning. The majority of secular traditions, involving morality, emphasize and iterate different virtues, including compassion, honesty, and justice. The moral systems, regardless of being religious or non-religious, agree on these very core foundational values. Various non-religious commentators have supported the ability of secular value frameworks to provide useful guides. Bernard Williams argued that, "Either one's motives for following the moral word of God are moral motives, or they are not. If they are, then one is already equipped with moral motivations, and the introduction of God adds nothing extra. But if they are not moral motives, then they will be motives of such a kind that they cannot appropriately motivate morality at all ... we reach the conclusion that any appeal to God in this connection either adds to nothing at all, or it adds the wrong sort of thing." Other observers criticize religious morals as incompatible with modern social norms. For example, popular atheist Richard Dawkins, writing in The God Delusion, has stated that religious people have committed a wide variety of acts and held certain beliefs through history that we now consider morally repugnant. He has stated that Adolf Hitler and the Nazis held broadly Christian religious beliefs that inspired the Holocaust on account of antisemitic Christian doctrine, that Christians have traditionally imposed unfair restrictions on the legal and civil rights of women, and that Christians have condoned slavery of some form or description throughout most of Christianity's history. According to Paul Copan, the position of the Bible to slaves is a positive one for the slaves in that Jewish laws imposed a death penalty on those pursuing slavery and treated slaves as persons, not property.

== By religion ==
- Christian values
- Hashkafa
- Morality in Islam
- Niyama

== See also ==
- Criticism of Christianity § Ethics
- Criticism of Islam § Morality
- Ethics in religion
- Morality without religion

== Notes ==
a. Zuckerman identifies that Scandinavians have "relatively high rates of petty crime and burglary", but "their overall rates of violent crime—such as murder, aggravated assault, and rape—are among the lowest on earth" (Zuckerman 2008, pp. 5–6).
b. The authors also state that "A few hundred years ago rates of homicide were astronomical in Christian Europe and the American colonies," and "[t]he least theistic secular developing democracies such as Japan, France, and Scandinavia have been most successful in these regards." They argue for a positive correlation between the degree of public religiosity in a society and certain measures of dysfunction, an analysis published later in the same journal argues that a number of methodological problems undermine any findings or conclusions in the research.
