= Libertarian conservatism =

Ideology combining conservatism with libertarianism

Libertarian conservatism, also referred to as conservative libertarianism and, more rarely, conservatarianism, is a libertarian political and social philosophy that combines conservatism and libertarianism, representing the libertarian wing of conservatism and vice versa.

Libertarian conservatism advocates the greatest possible economic liberty and the least possible government regulation of social life (described as "small government"), mirroring laissez-faire classical liberalism, but harnesses this to a belief in a more socially conservative philosophy emphasizing authority, morality, and duty. Primarily an American ideology, libertarian conservatism prioritizes liberty, promoting free expression, freedom of choice and free-market capitalism to achieve conservative ends while rejecting liberal social engineering.

Although having similarities to liberal conservatism and therefore mainstream American conservatism with both being influenced by classical liberal thought; libertarian conservatives are far more anti-statist and are much more hostile to government intervention in both social and economic matters.

== Philosophy ==
In political science, libertarian conservatism is an ideology that combines the advocacy of economic and legal principles such as fiscal discipline, respect for contracts, defense of private property and free markets, fewer laws banning minor crimes, and the traditional conservative stress on self-help and freedom of choice under a laissez-faire and economically liberal capitalist society with social tenets such as the importance of religion and the value of religious morality through a framework of limited, constitutional, representative government. For Margaret Randall, libertarian conservatism began as an expression of liberal individualism and the demand for personal freedom.

=== Unity or conflict ===
In 2006, Nelson Hultberg wrote that there is "philosophical common ground" between libertarians and conservatives. According to Hultberg, "[t]he true conservative movement was, from the start, a blend of political libertarianism, cultural conservatism, and non-interventionism abroad bequeathed to us via the Founding Fathers". He said that such libertarian conservatism was "hijacked" by neoconservatism, "by the very enemies it was formed to fight—Fabians, New Dealers, welfarists, progressives, globalists, interventionists, militarists, nation builders, and all the rest of the collectivist ilk that was assiduously working to destroy the Founders' Republic of States".

Other scholars, such as conservative philosopher Russell Kirk, have highlighted the contrasts between conservatives and libertarians, stating that "to talk of forming a league or coalition between these two is like advocating a union of ice and fire". Libertarian activist Jerome Tuccille wrote: "Libertarianism is basically Aristotelian (reason, objectivity, individual self-sufficiency) while conservatism is just fundamentally Platonic (privileged elitism, mysticism, collective order)."

According to Andrew Gilbert, conservative parties such as the British Conservative Party and the American Republican Party hold a significant libertarian conservative wing, although Gilbert argues that "it is questionable to what extent conservatism and libertarianism are compatible". According to Mark A. Graber, libertarian conservatives are "philosophically consistent liberal legal individualists".

In 1998, George Wescott Carey edited Freedom and Virtue: The Conservative/Libertarian Debate, a book which contains essays that Carey describes as representing "the tension between liberty and morality" and "the main fault line dividing the two philosophies". For Brian Farmer, "Libertarianism is a form of Conservatism often considered separate from the more mainstream conservative ideologies, partially because it is a bit more extreme, and partially because Libertarians often separate themselves from other forms of more mainstream Conservatism".

=== Economics ===
Libertarian conservatism subscribes to the libertarian idea of free-market capitalism, advocating minimal to no government interference in the market. A number of libertarian conservatives favor the Austrian School of economics and are critical of fiat money. Libertarian conservatives also support wherever possible privatizing services traditionally run or provided by the government, from airports and air traffic control systems to toll roads and toll booths. Libertarian conservatism advocates economic freedom in the product and capital markets and consumption whilst excluding collective action, collective bargaining and labor organization in general.

== History ==
In the 1950s, Frank Meyer, a prominent contributor to the National Review, called his own combination of libertarianism and conservatism fusionism. The agorist philosopher Samuel Edward Konkin III coined the term right-libertarianism in order to describe this mixed ideology.

In a 1975 interview with Reason, California Governor Ronald Reagan appealed to libertarians when he stated to "believe the very heart and soul of conservatism is libertarianism". Ron Paul was one of the first elected officials in the nation to support Reagan's presidential campaign and actively campaigned for Reagan in 1976 and 1980. However, Ron Paul quickly became disillusioned with the Reagan administration's policies after Reagan's election in 1980 and later recalled being the only Republican to vote against Reagan budget proposals in 1981, aghast that "in 1977, Jimmy Carter proposed a budget with a $38 billion deficit, and every Republican in the House voted against it. In 1981, Reagan proposed a budget with a $45 billion deficit—which turned out to be $113 billion—and Republicans were cheering his great victory. They were living in a storybook land". Ron Paul expressed his disgust with the political culture of both major parties in a speech delivered in 1984 upon resigning from the House of Representatives to prepare for a failed run for the Senate and eventually apologized to his libertarian friends for having supported Reagan. By 1987, Ron Paul was ready to sever all ties to the Republican Party as explained in a blistering resignation letter. While affiliated with both Libertarian and Republican parties at different times, Ron Paul stated to have always been a libertarian at heart.

In the 1980s, libertarians such as Ron Paul and Murray Rothbard criticized President Reagan, Reaganomics and policies of the Reagan administration for, among other reasons, having turned the United States' big trade deficit into debt and the United States became a debtor nation for the first time since World War I under the Reagan administration. Rothbard argued that the presidency of Reagan has been "a disaster for libertarianism in the United States" and Ron Paul described Reagan himself as "a dramatic failure".

Already a radical classical liberal and anti-interventionist strongly influenced by the Old Right, especially its opposition to the managerial state whilst being more unequivocally anti-war and anti-imperialist, Rothbard had become the doyen of libertarianism in the United States. After his departure from the New Left, with which he helped build for a few years a relationship with other libertarians, Rothbard had involved the segment of the libertarian movement loyal to him in an alliance with the growing paleoconservative movement, seen by many observers, libertarian and otherwise, as flirting with racism and social reaction. Suggesting that libertarians needed a new cultural profile that would make them more acceptable to socially and culturally conservative people, Rothbard criticized the tendency of proponents of libertarianism to appeal to "'free spirits,' to people who don't want to push other people around, and who don't want to be pushed around themselves" in contrast to "the bulk of Americans", who "might well be tight-assed conformists, who want to stamp out drugs in their vicinity, kick out people with strange dress habits, etc." whilst emphasizing that this was relevant as a matter of strategy. Rothbard argued that the failure to pitch the libertarian message to Middle America might result in the loss of "the tight-assed majority".

In the 1990s, Rothbard, Lew Rockwell and others described their libertarian conservative views as paleolibertarianism. In an early statement of this position, Rockwell and Jeffrey Tucker argued for a specifically Christian libertarianism. Later, Rockwell would no longer consider himself a "paleolibertarian" and was "happy with the term libertarian". Those libertarians continued their opposition to "all forms of government intervention—economic, cultural, social, international" whilst upholding cultural conservatism in social thought and behavior. Paleolibertarians opposed a licentious libertarianism which advocated "freedom from bourgeois morality, and social authority". Rockwell later stated to have dropped that self-description because people confused it with paleoconservatism which libertarians such as Rockwell rejected. While distancing himself from the paleolibertarian alliance strategy, Rockwell affirmed paleoconservatives for their "work on the immigration issue", maintaining that "porous borders in Texas and California" could be seen as "reducing liberty, not increasing it, through a form of publicly subsidized right to trespass".

In 2001, Edward Feser emphasized that libertarianism does not require individuals to reject traditional conservative values. Libertarianism supports the ideas of liberty, privacy and ending the war on marijuana at the legal level without changing personal values. Defending the fusion of traditionalist conservatism with libertarianism and rejecting the view that libertarianism necessarily requires support for a liberal culture, Feser implied that a central issue for those who share his viewpoint is "the preservation of traditional morality—particularly traditional sexual morality, with its idealization of marriage and its insistence that sexual activity be confined within the bounds of that institution, but also a general emphasis on dignity and temperance over self-indulgence and dissolute living".

Hans-Hermann Hoppe is a libertarian conservative, whose belief in rights of property owners to establish private covenant communities, from which homosexuals and political dissidents may be "physically removed", has been strongly criticized. Hoppe also garnered controversy due to his support for restrictive limits on immigration which critics argue is at odds with libertarianism. In Democracy: The God That Failed, first published in 2001, Hoppe argued that "libertarians must be conservatives". Hoppe acknowledged "the importance, under clearly stated circumstances, of discriminating against communists, democrats, and habitual advocates of alternative, non-family centered lifestyles, including homosexuals". In contrast to Walter Block, Hoppe argued that libertarianism need not be seen as requiring open borders and attributed "open border enthusiasm" to "egalitarianism". While defending "market anarchy" in preference to both, Hoppe has argued for the superiority of monarchy to democracy, maintaining that monarchs are likely to be better stewards of the territory they claim to own than democratic politicians, whose time horizons may be shorter.

== Notable people ==
Richard Epstein, Milton Friedman, Friedrich Hayek, Ludwig von Mises, Albert Jay Nock, Richard Posner, Peter Schiff, Thomas Sowell, Thomas Massie, David Stockman, Dennis Miller, Peter Thiel, Jack Kemp and Walter E. Williams have been described as libertarian conservatives. Former Congressman Ron Paul and his son Senator Rand Paul have been described as combining conservative and libertarian small government ideas and showing how the Constitution of the United States defends the individual and most libertarian views. Barry Goldwater who furthered conservatism in America was a libertarian conservative. Javier Milei, the current President of Argentina, has also been referred to as a libertarian conservative.

Filmmaker and producer Ivan Reitman, described his political views as "conservative-slash-libertarian".

== See also ==
- Anti-Federalism
- Chicago school of economics
- Democracy promotion
- Empire of Liberty
- Fiscal conservatism
- Freedom Caucus
- Jeffersonian democracy
- Libertarianism and Objectivism
- Libertarian perspectives on foreign intervention
- Libertarian Republican
- Liberty Caucus
- Neo-libertarianism
- Paleolibertarianism
- Republican Liberty Caucus
- Starve the beast
- Supply-side economics
- Tea Party movement
- Western conservatism

== Bibliography ==
- Heywood, Andrew (2015). Key Concepts in Politics and International Relations: Palgrave Key Concepts. London: Macmillan International Higher Education. ISBN 9781137494771.
- Heywood, Andrew (2004). Political Theory, Third Edition: An Introduction. Palgrave Macmillan. ISBN 0333961803.
- Johnston, Larry (2007). Politics: An Introduction to the Modern Democratic State. Toronto: University of Toronto Press. ISBN 9781442600409.
- Van de Haar, Edwin (2015). Degrees of Freedom: Liberal Political Philosophy and Ideology. New Brunswick, New Jersey: Transaction Publishers. ISBN 9781412855754.
