= Libertarian Democrat =

Ideological faction within the U.S. Democratic Party

In American politics, a libertarian Democrat is a member of the Democratic Party with political views that are relatively libertarian compared to the views of the national party.

While other factions of the Democratic Party, such as the Blue Dog Coalition, the New Democrat Coalition and the Congressional Progressive Caucus, are organized in the Congress, the libertarian faction is not organized in such a way.

== Ideology ==
Libertarian Democrats oppose NSA warrantless surveillance. In 2013, well over half the House Democrats (111 of 194) voted to defund the NSA's telephone phone surveillance program.

Former representative and current Governor Jared Polis of Colorado, a libertarian-oriented Democrat, wrote in Reason magazine: "I believe that libertarians should vote for Democratic candidates, particularly as our Democratic nominees are increasingly more supportive of individual liberty and freedom than Republicans". He cited opposition to the Stop Online Piracy Act, support for the legalization of marijuana, support for the separation of church and state, support for abortion rights and individual bodily autonomy, opposition to mass surveillance and support for tax-code reform as areas where the majority of Democrats align well with libertarian values.

== History ==
=== Modern era ===
After election losses in 2004, the Democratic Party reexamined its position on gun control which became a matter of discussion, brought up by Howard Dean, Bill Richardson, Brian Schweitzer and other Democrats who had won in states where Second Amendment rights are important to many voters. The resulting stance on gun control brought in libertarian minded voters, influencing other beliefs.

In the 2010s, following the revelations by Edward Snowden about NSA surveillance in 2013, the increasing advent of online decentralization and cryptocurrencies like Bitcoin, the perceived failure of the war on drugs and the police violence in places like Ferguson, Democratic lawmakers such as Senators Ron Wyden, Kirsten Gillibrand and Cory Booker and Representative Jared Polis have worked alongside libertarian Republicans like Senator Rand Paul and Representative Justin Amash to curb what is seen as government overreach in each of these areas, earning plaudits from such traditional libertarian sources as Reason magazine. The growing political power of Silicon Valley, a longtime Democratic stronghold that is friendly to economic deregulation and strong civil liberties protections while maintaining traditionally liberal views on social issues, has also seriously affected the increasingly libertarian leanings of young Democrats.

The libertarian faction has influenced the presidential level as well in the post-Bush era. Alaska Senator and presidential aspirant Mike Gravel left the Democratic Party midway through the 2008 presidential election cycle to seek the Libertarian Party presidential nomination, and many anti-war and civil libertarian Democrats were energized by the 2008 and 2012 presidential campaigns of libertarian Republican Ron Paul. This constituency arguably embraced the 2016 and 2020 presidential campaigns of independent Democrat Bernie Sanders for the same reasons. In the state of New Hampshire, libertarians operating from the Free State Project have been elected to various offices running as a mixture of both Republicans and Democrats. A 2015 Reuters poll found that 22% of Democratic voters identified themselves as "libertarian," more than the percentage of Republicans but less than the percentage of independents.

== Public figures ==
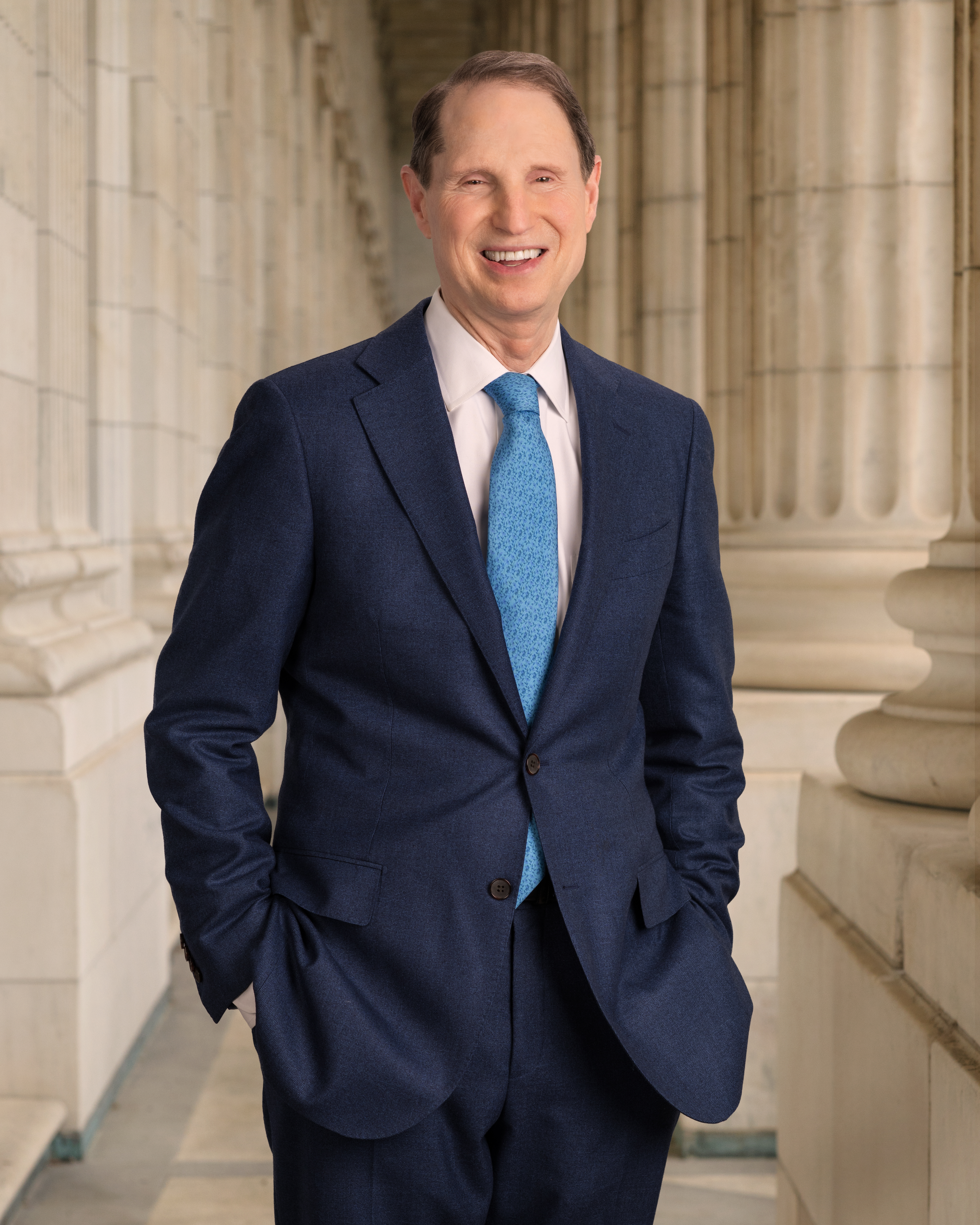
Ron Wyden

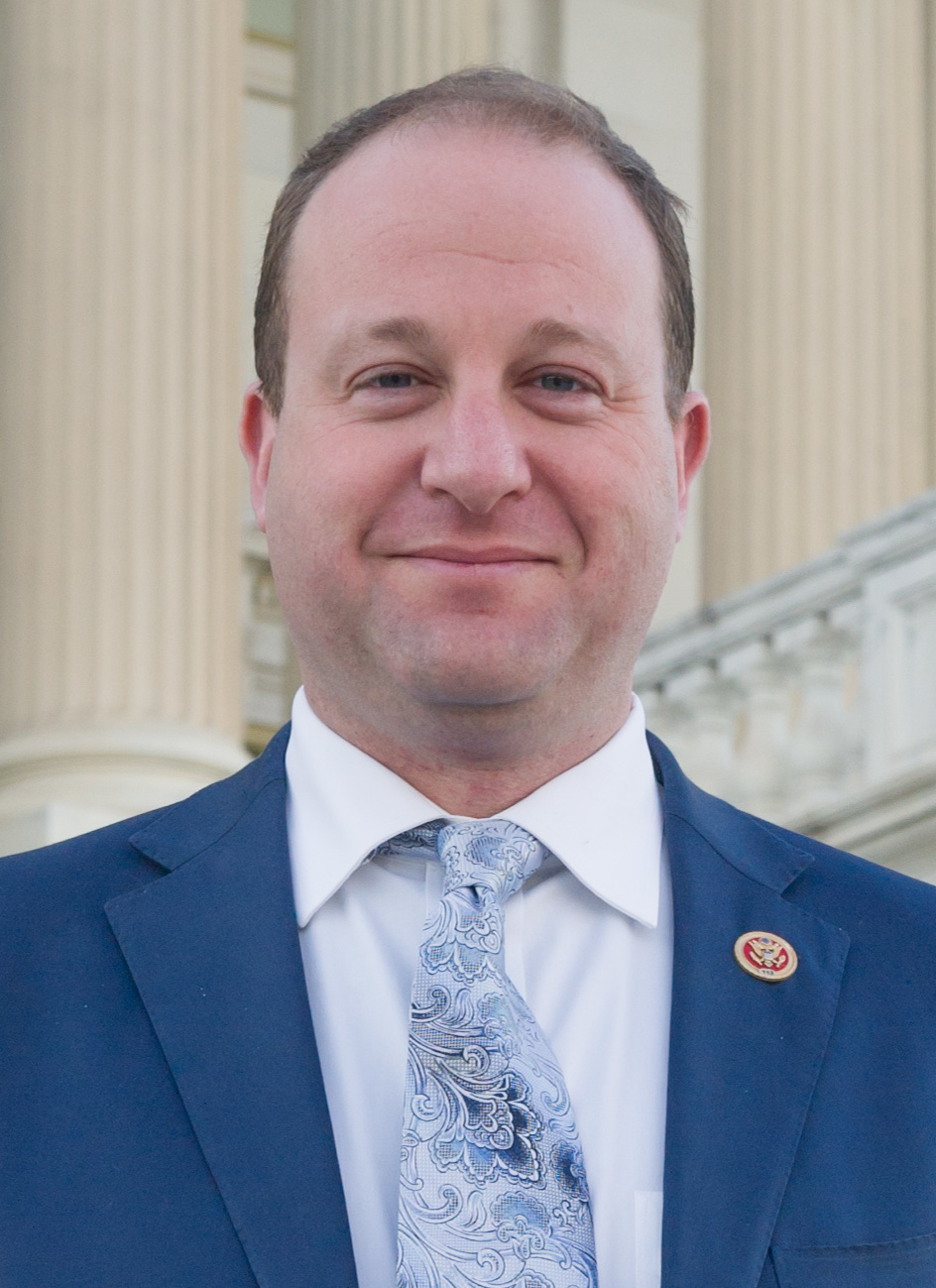
Jared Polis

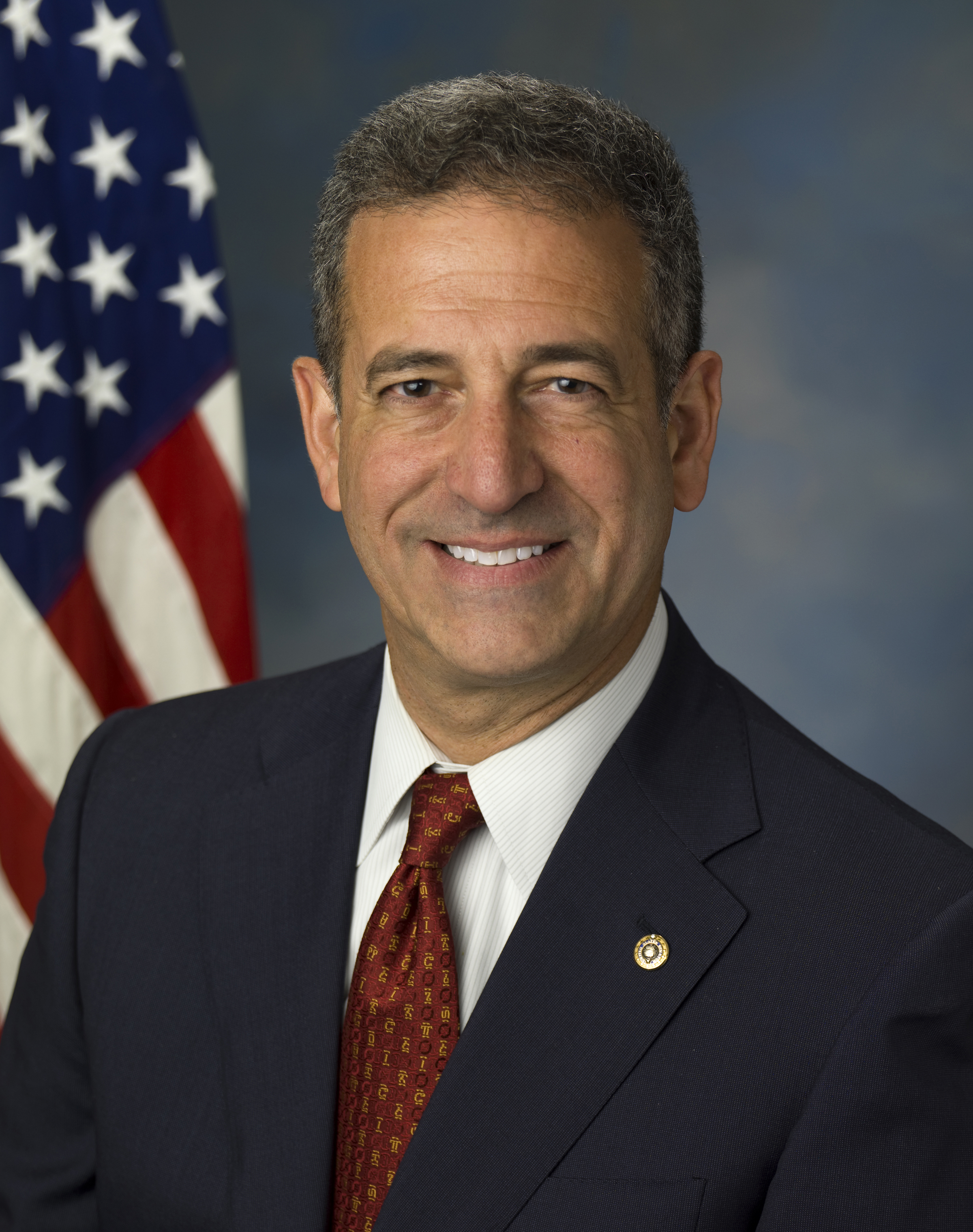
Russ Feingold

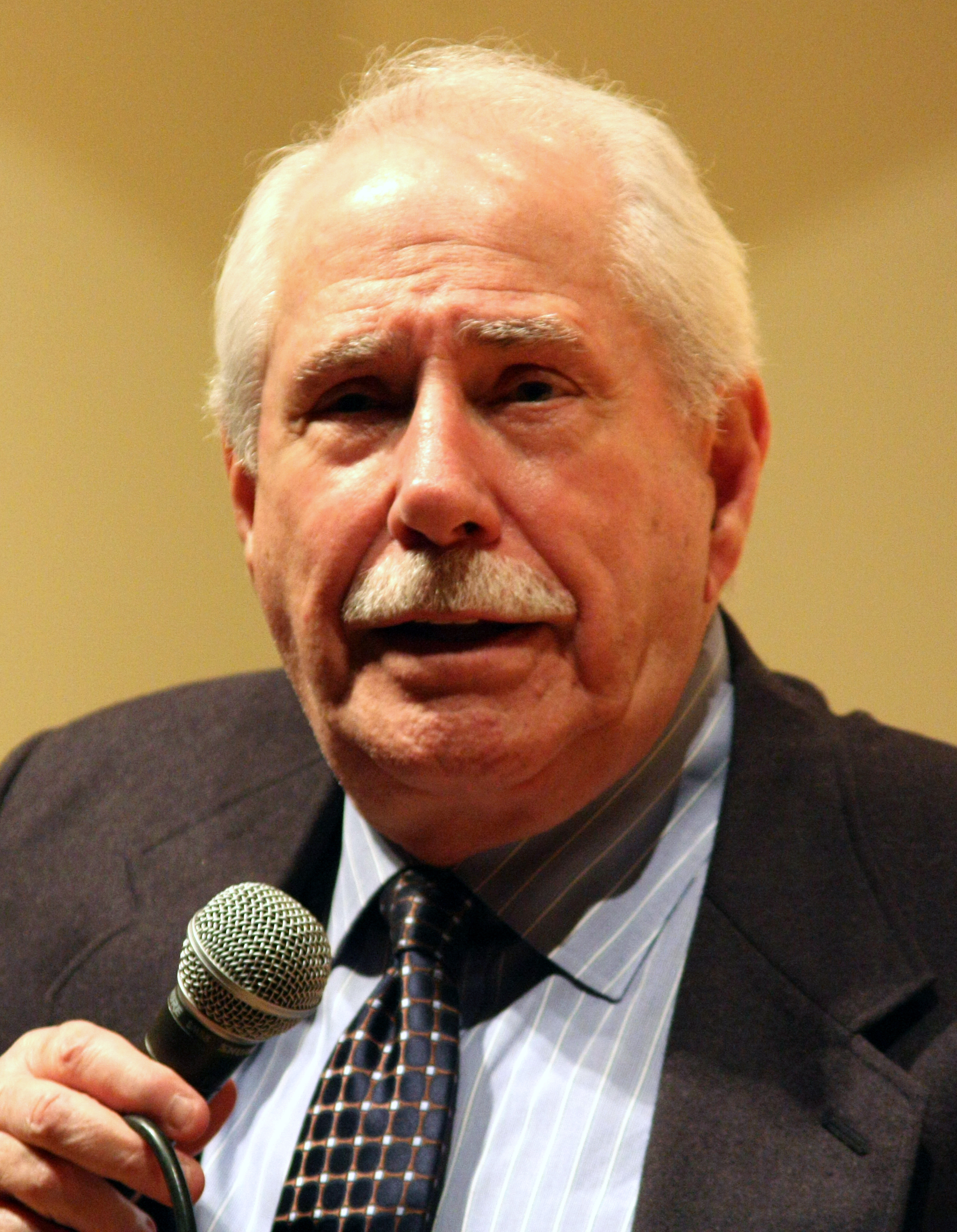
Mike Gravel

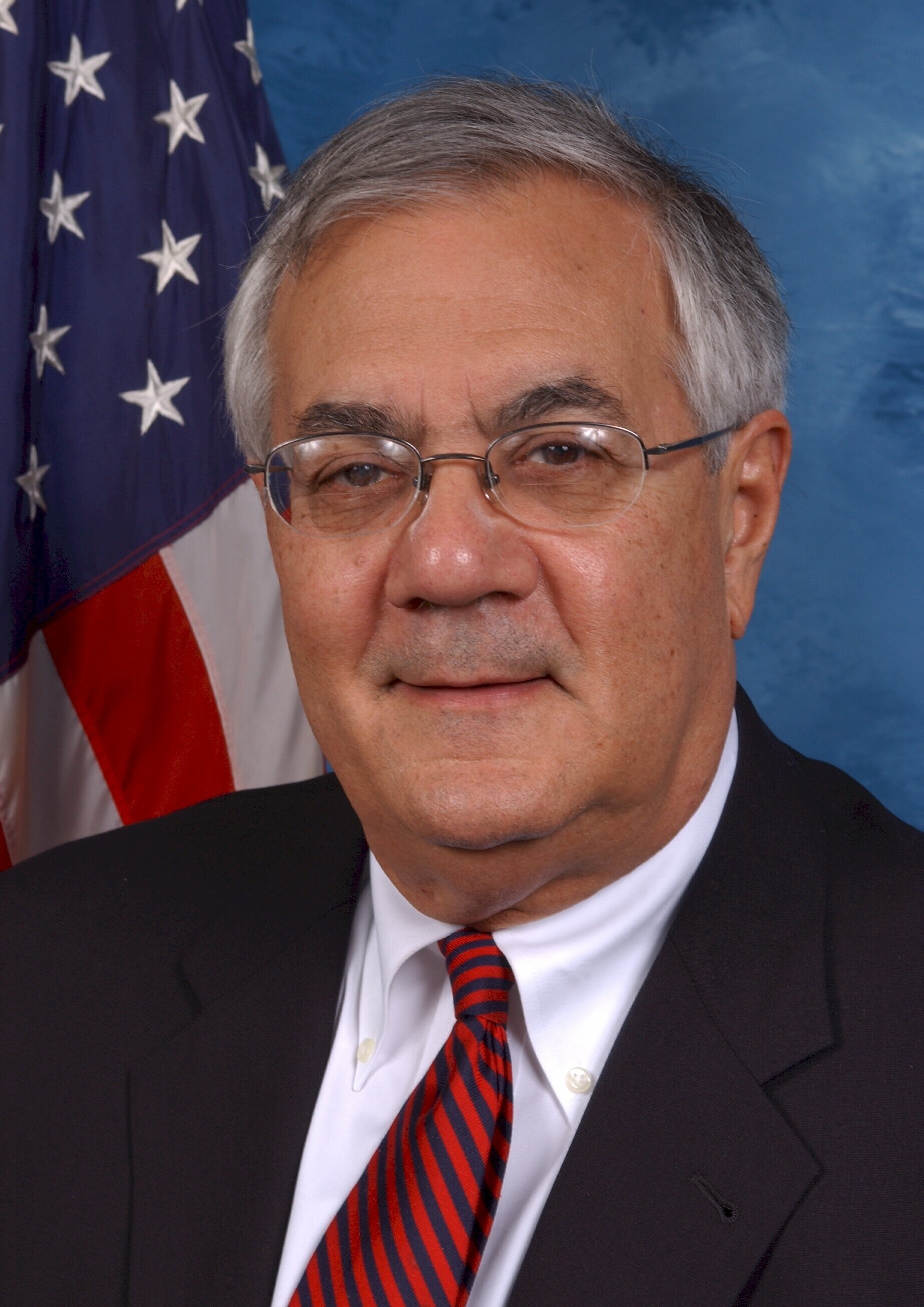
Barney Frank

=== Current elected officials ===
==== Senate ====
- Cory Booker, United States Senator from New Jersey, 38th Mayor of Newark (2006–2013), Member of the Newark Municipal Council from the Central Ward (1998–2002). He is described by a longtime friend as having a "libertarian bent" as mayor of Newark, New Jersey. Booker supported a number of policies backed by libertarians, including charter schools, school voucher programs, and enterprise zones. Daniel J. Mitchell of the Cato Institute identifies Booker as having libertarian views in his strong opposition to the war on drugs.
- Ron Wyden, United States Senator from Oregon, Chair of Senate Finance Committee (2014–2015, 2021–Present), Ranking Member of Senate Finance Committee (2015–2021), Chair of Senate Energy Committee (2013–2014), and Member of United States House of Representatives from Oregon's 3rd congressional district (1981–1996). He is known for his civil libertarian views and cooperation with libertarian Republican Senator Rand Paul in efforts against the use of domestic drones and warrantless surveillance.

==== Governors ====
- Jared Polis, 43rd Governor of Colorado, member of the United States House of Representatives from Colorado's 2nd congressional district (2009–2019), and member of the Colorado State Board of Education (2001–2007). In 2014, the libertarian magazine Reason described Polis as "left-libertarianish" and the "most libertarian-leaning Democrat" in Congress due to his role as "a leading voice on civil liberties, from gun rights to online privacy, from defending Bitcoin to advocating legal weed." Polis has written an op-ed in Reason magazine arguing that libertarian-inclined citizens should vote for Democrats. Polis has emphasized digital freedom issues and opposition to mass surveillance and warrantless wiretapping. While in Congress, he was an occasional Democratic visitor to future Libertarian Representative Justin Amash's otherwise Republican-dominated House Liberty Caucus. As Colorado governor, Polis vetoed in 2019 three bills that would have created occupational licensing requirements for homeowners' association managers, sports agents, and genetic counselors; the vetoes reflected Polis' libertarian leanings. However, since he was elected Governor, Polis has shown a liberal progressive stance with his backing and signing of legislation increasing state oversight of the oil and gas industry through Senate Bill 181, restricting gun rights through six different gun control bills, as well as 14 bills expanding government regulation over the healthcare industry as of 2021. Governor Polis, on the other hand, has also backed the use of cryptocurrencies and the elimination of Colorado's Taxpayer Bill of Rights (TABOR) and tax increases on tobacco.
- Tim Walz, 41st Governor of Minnesota, member of the United States House of Representatives from Minnesota's 1st congressional district (2007–2019), who has said, "In Minnesota, we follow the golden rule: Mind your own damn business. We mind ours, you mind yours". On May 30, 2023, he signed into law House File 100 which legalized recreational cannabis in Minnesota. While in Congress, Walz was a strong supporter of gun rights and was endorsed by the NRA Political Victory Fund (NRA-PVF) multiple times, receiving an A grade from the organization. However, following the Parkland high school shooting in 2018, he denounced the NRA and began to support increased regulations on firearms.

==== State representatives ====
- Amanda Bouldin, Member of New Hampshire House of Representatives, Free State Project participant and former Tea Party activist

=== Former elected officials ===
==== Presidents ====
- Grover Cleveland

==== United States Senate ====
- Russ Feingold, United States Special Envoy for the African Great Lakes and the Congo-Kinshasa (2013–2015), United States Senator from Wisconsin (1993–2011), and Member of Wisconsin Senate (1983–1993). He is known for his civil libertarian views and for being the sole senator to vote against the USA Patriot Act in 2001.
- Mike Gravel, United States Senator from Alaska (1969–1981), 3rd Speaker of Alaska House of Representatives (1965–1967), and Member of Alaska House of Representatives (1963–1967). After his time in the Senate, Gravel unsuccessfully ran for the Democratic presidential nomination in 2008, switching to the Libertarian Party that same year and losing its nomination as well (see Mike Gravel 2008 presidential campaign). After that he then switched back to the Democratic Party in 2010 and remained in it until his death in 2021 (even running for president again as a Democrat in the 2020 election).

==== United States House of Representatives ====
- Barney Frank, Member of United States House of Representatives from Massachusetts's 4th congressional district (1981–2013), Chair of the House Financial Services Committee (2007–2011), and Member of Massachusetts House of Representatives (1973–1981). He has been a critic of the Federal Reserve, partnering with certain Republicans in opposition to some of its policies. In 2001, he joined with libertarian Republican Congressman Ron Paul in helping pass the States' Rights to Medical Marijuana Act, an attempt to stop the federal government from preempting states' medical marijuana laws. Frank again partnered with Paul in support of online gambling rights. In 2006, both strongly opposed the Internet Gambling Prohibition Act.
- Tulsi Gabbard, Member of United States House of Representatives from Hawaii's 2nd congressional district (2013–2021), Vice Chair of Democratic National Committee (2013–2016), Member of the Honolulu City Council (2011–2012), and Member of Hawaii House of Representatives (2002–2004). She earned the praise of Ron Paul for her strong anti-war stances, and joined efforts with her libertarian-leaning colleagues in Congress Justin Amash, Thomas Massie and Rand Paul in legislation aimed to defund the National Security Agency, audit the Federal Reserve and promote a more non-interventionist foreign policy. Gabbard also gained the support of former New Mexico Governor and two-time Libertarian Party presidential candidate Gary Johnson during her 2020 presidential bid. (Later left the party and became an independent, then she became a Republican)
- Tim Penny, Member of United States House of Representatives from Minnesota's 1st congressional district (1983–1995) and Member of Minnesota Senate (1977–1983). He is described as a fiscal conservative, Penny worked for the libertarian-leaning Cato Institute after leaving Congress.
- Larry McDonald

==== Governors ====
- Bill Richardson, 30th Governor of New Mexico (2003–2011), 9th United States Secretary of Energy (1998–2001), 21st United States Ambassador to the United Nations (1997–1998), and Member of United States House of Representatives from New Mexico's 3rd congressional district (1983–1997).
- Brian Schweitzer 23rd Governor of Montana (2005–2013).
- Jerry Brown, 34th and 39th Governor of California (1975–1983, 2011–2019), 31st Attorney General of California (2007–2011), 47th Mayor of Oakland (1999–2007), Chair of California Democratic Party (1989–1991), and 23rd California Secretary of State (1971–1975).

==== State lower chambers ====
- Elizabeth Edwards, Member of New Hampshire House of Representatives (2014–2018). She has been described by WMUR as "having a libertarian streak".
- Joseph Stallcop, Member of New Hampshire House of Representatives (2016–2018). He left the Democratic Party for the Libertarian Party in 2017, describing his views as "classically liberal".

=== Authors and scholars ===
- Camille Paglia, educator and feminist author.

=== Others ===
- KGO Radio host and former presidential candidate Gene Burns.
- Environmental lawyer, writer and 2024 presidential candidate Robert F. Kennedy Jr. (Later redeclared himself running as an independent)
- Entrepreneur, philanthropist, 2020 presidential and 2021 NYC mayoral candidate Andrew Yang. (Later started his own party)

== See also ==
- Blue Dog Coalition
- Factions in the Democratic Party
- Bourbon Democrat
- Conservative Democrat
- Green libertarianism
- Left-libertarianism
- Libertarian feminism
- Classical liberalism
- Civil libertarianism
- Libertarian perspectives on political alliances
- Libertarian Republican
- Rockefeller Republican
- Liberal conservatism
- American Civil Liberties Union
