= Libertarian Republican =

US Republican Party member who has advocated libertarian policies

- Ideology: Right-libertarianism; Non-interventionism; Factions: Libertarian conservatism; Classical liberalism (US)
- Political position: Center-right to right-wing
- National affiliation: Republican Party

In American politics, a Libertarian Republican or Republitarian is a politician or Republican Party member who has advocated libertarian policies while typically voting for and being involved with the Republican Party.

== Beliefs and size ==
The Republican Party has historically encompassed competing ideological factions. In 2012, the libertarian wing was characterized as smaller than the populist Tea Party faction (sometimes described as its more radical element), the pragmatic "Main Street" establishment, and the evangelical Christian conservatives. According to a 2012 New York Times analysis, libertarian Republicans have a variety of motivating issues. On economic and domestic policy, they favor deregulation and tax cuts, repeal of the Affordable Care Act, and protecting gun rights. On social issues, they favor privacy and oppose the USA Patriot Act and the war on drugs. On foreign and defense policy, libertarian Republicans are non-interventionists. Some libertarians favor abortion rights, while other libertarian Republicans oppose abortion. Two-thirds of libertarian Republicans are males.

In a 2014 Pew Research Center survey on political typology and polarization, 12% of Republicans described themselves as libertarian. In a 2023 New York Times poll of the Republican coalition, 14% of Republicans were considered libertarian conservatives. As of August 2023, 38% support providing additional support to Ukraine, 34% support cutting corporate taxes over raising tariffs, 19% consider themselves very conservative, 45% believe abortion should be mostly or always legal, 51% are against comprehensive immigration reform, 73% say they favor the "protection of individual freedom over traditional values", and 13% want a candidate who would "fight corporations that promote woke left ideology." In the 2024 Republican Party presidential primaries, 43% would vote for Donald Trump and 12% would vote for Ron DeSantis.

=== Organizations ===
The Republican Liberty Caucus, which describes itself as "the oldest continuously operating organization in the Liberty Republican movement with state charters nationwide," was founded in 1991. In the 1990s the group's chairs included Chuck Muth, Roger MacBride, and Congressman Ron Paul; in the 2000s, the group's chairs included Dave Nalle. The group's statement of principles affirms "the principle that individual rights and liberties are unlimited" and calls for free trade; the "privatization of all government assets"; the abolition of many federal agencies; the repeal of most current federal taxes in favor of a single flat income tax or national sales tax; and the phase-out of "compulsory government retirement, disability, and health programs."

The House Liberty Caucus is a congressional caucus formed by Libertarian Representative Justin Amash of Michigan, at the time a Republican. In 2014, the group "consisted of about 30 libertarian-inclined Republicans (and occasional Democratic visitors like Jared Polis)." In February 2019, Politico reported that the House Liberty Caucus had eight members. The list of congressional member organizations (CMOs) for the 118th Congress indicates that Warren Davidson is the leader of the Congressional Liberty Caucus.

== Public figures ==
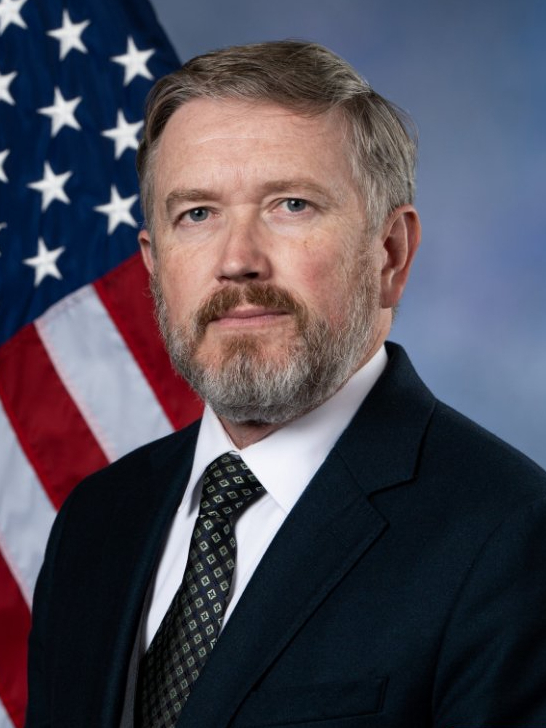
Thomas Massie

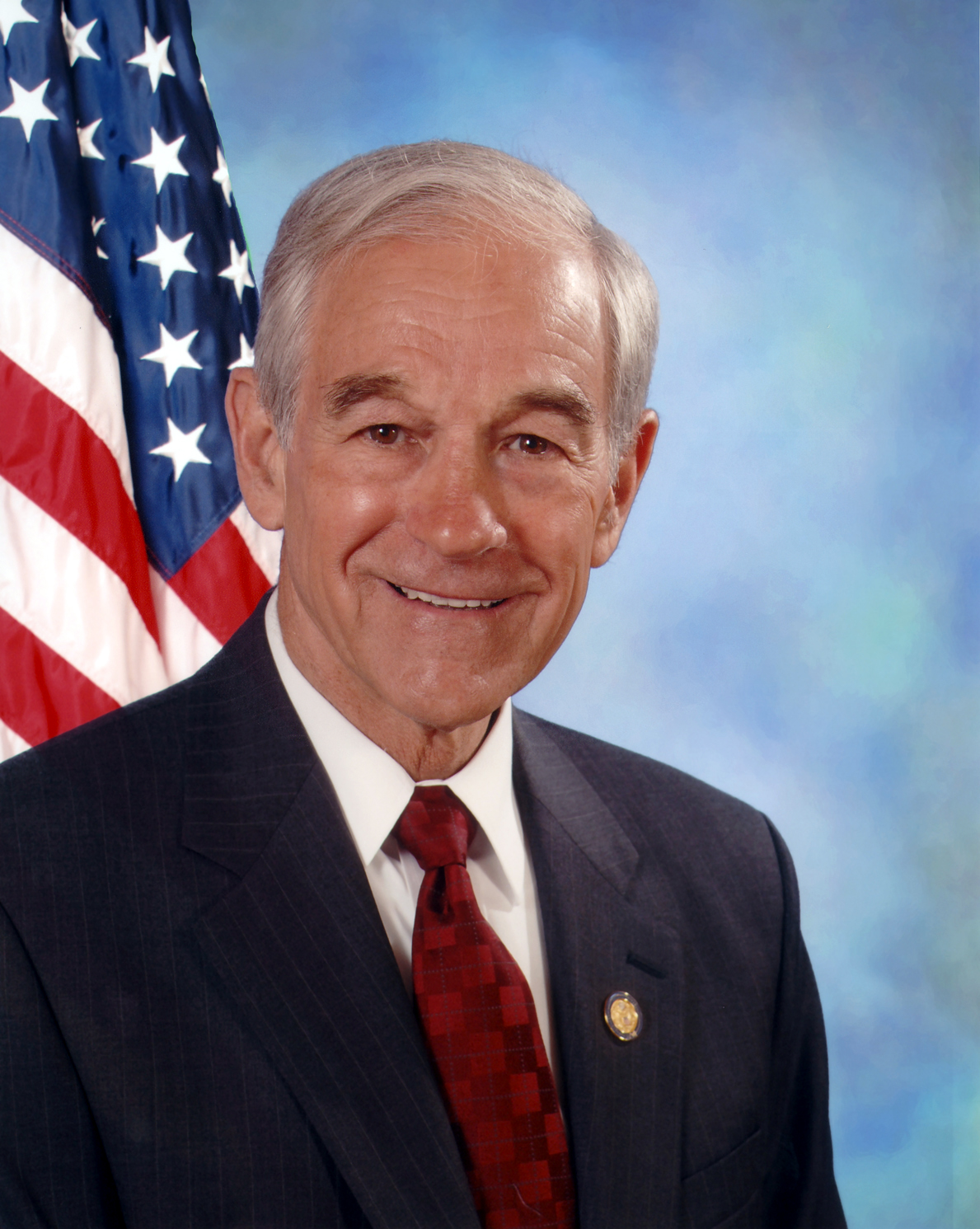
Ron Paul

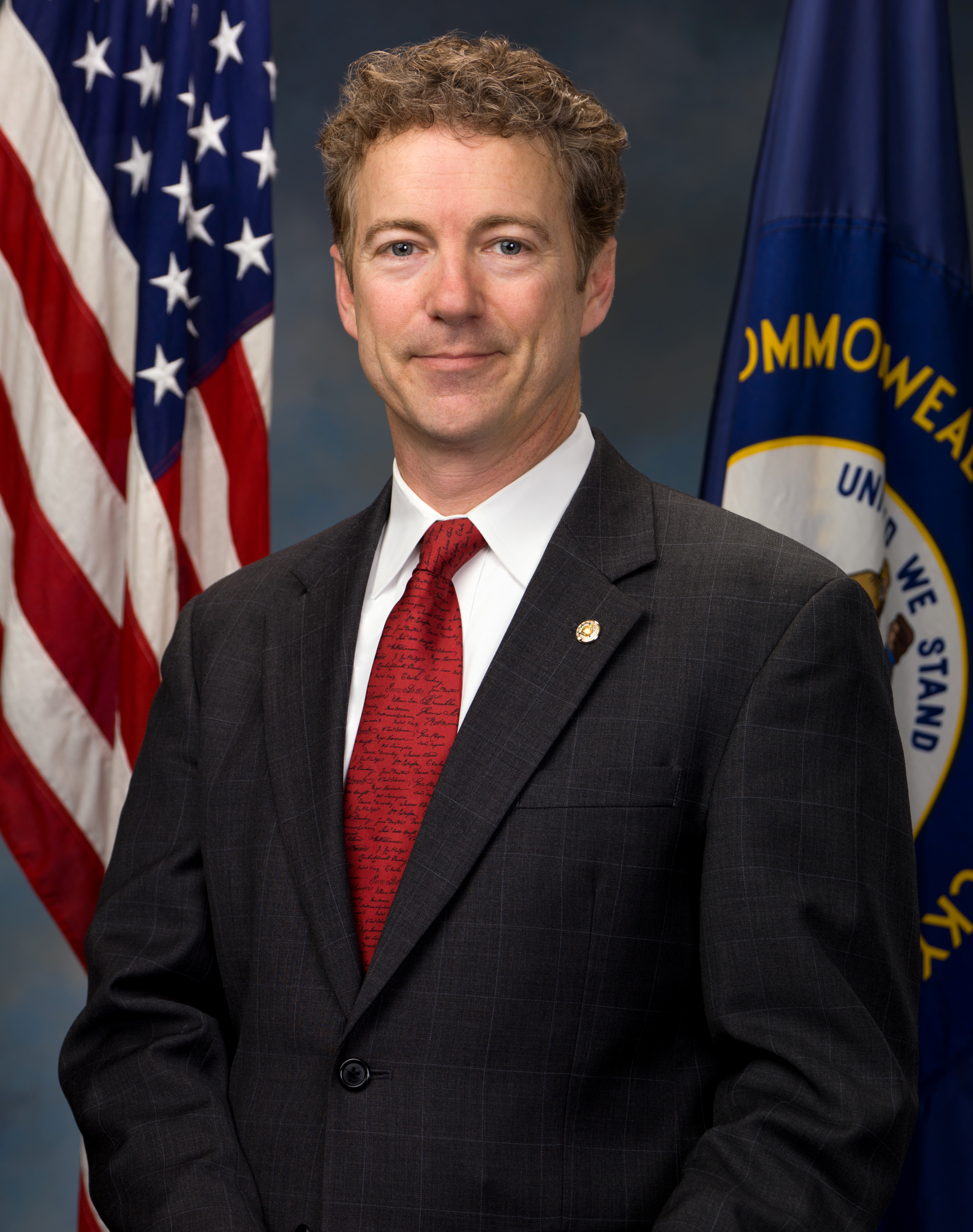
Rand Paul

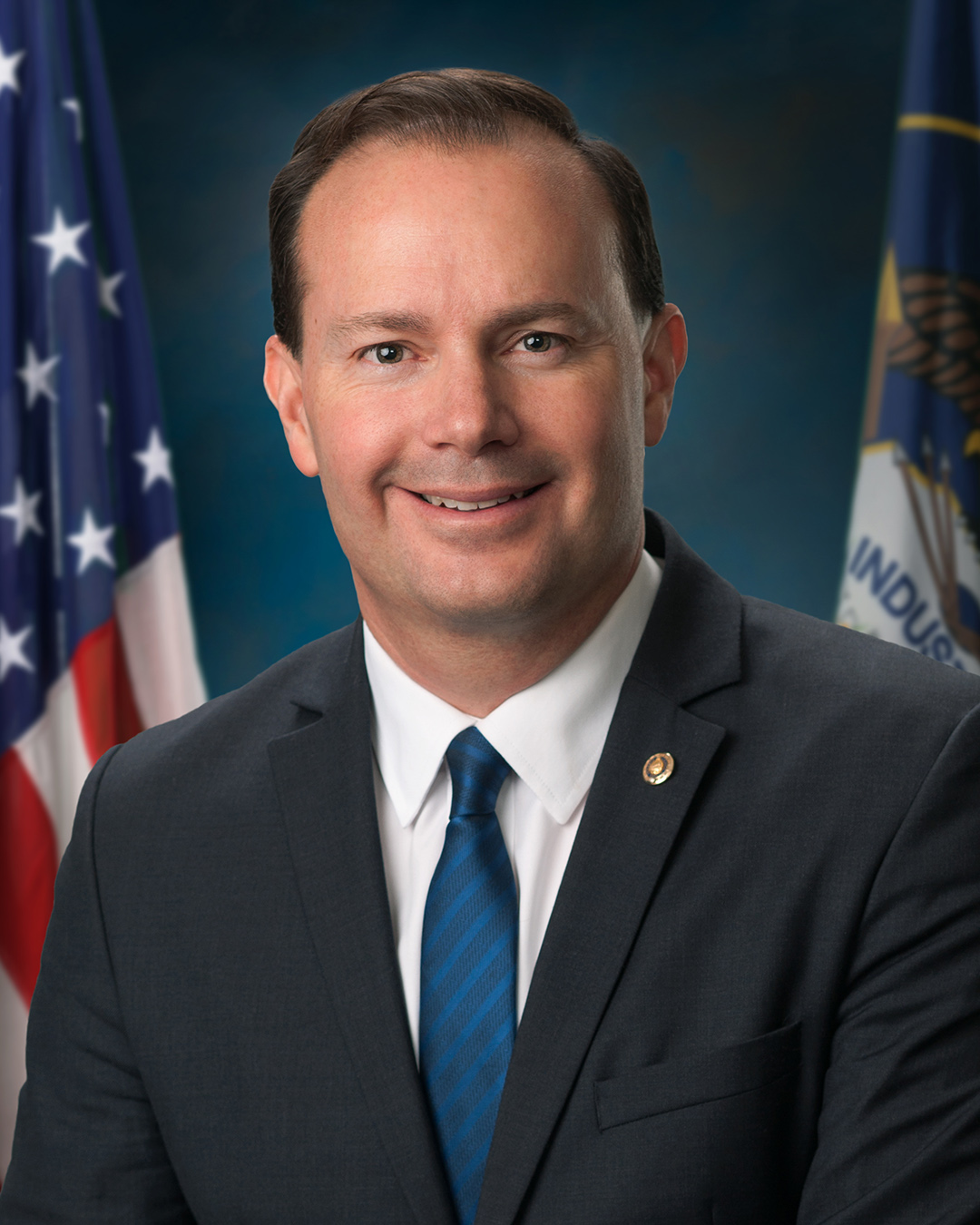
Mike Lee

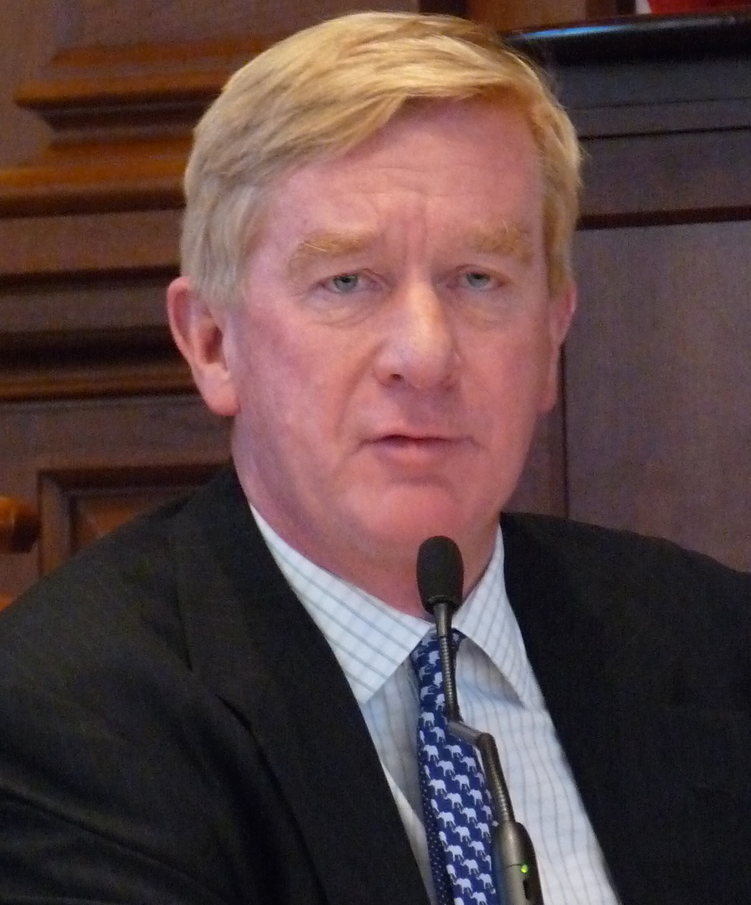
William Weld

=== Cabinet-level officials ===
- Former Director Mick Mulvaney of the Office of Management and Budget; former acting White House Chief of Staff; former U.S. Representative from South Carolina

=== Representatives ===
- Representative Thomas Massie of Kentucky – described as "a Northern Kentucky Republican with libertarian leanings," Massie is a "self-styled libertarian" who has received libertarian support, although he has also described himself as a "'constitutional conservative' within the Republican Party."
- Representative Tom McClintock of California – described as "libertarian leaning" by Reason magazine.
- Representative Nancy Mace of South Carolina - Described to have a "fusion" of Libertarian views

==== Former representatives ====
- Former Representative Justin Amash of Michigan – Chairman of the Liberty Caucus; left Republican Party in 2019 to become an Independent. In 2020, he switched to the Libertarian Party and thus became the first Libertarian member to hold a seat in Congress. However, in 2024 he announced he would run for U.S. Senate as a Republican.
- Former Representative Matt Gaetz of Florida – self-describes as a "libertarian populist" and described by media as having a "strong libertarian streak".
- Former Representative Denver Riggleman of Virginia
- Former Representative Dana Rohrabacher of California
- Former Representative Ted Yoho of Florida
- Former Representative Bob Barr of Georgia
- Former Representative Kerry Bentivolio of Michigan
- Former Representative Connie Mack IV of Florida – described as "a staunch fiscal conservative...with libertarian tendencies."
- Former Representative Ron Paul of Texas – longstanding Libertarian Republican icon; unsuccessfully ran for president in 1988 as the Libertarian nominee, and in 2008 and 2012 as a Republican candidate. He has been described as one of the leading figures of the late 2000s and early 2010s who helped spur the growing popularity of the Tea Party movement. Through his presidential campaigns and time in Congress, he was also known as one of the staunchest critics of the Federal Reserve, U.S. surveillance state, and the wars on terror and drugs.

=== Senators ===
- Rand Paul, U.S. Senator from Kentucky (2011–present) – is sometimes regarded as libertarian-leaning, and has on multiple occasions described himself as such when discussing matters like the national debt and other economic issues, domestic surveillance, foreign military intervention, and the war on drugs. However, David Boaz of the Cato Institute notes that "Paul doesn't claim to be a libertarian, and he takes positions that many libertarians disagree with."
- Mike Lee, U.S. Senator from Utah (2011–present) – described as an economic and civil libertarian. Has often partnered with Rand Paul in the Senate on several libertarian-conservative issues.
- Cynthia Lummis, U.S. Senator from Wyoming (2021–present) – self-describes as a "libertarian-leaning Republican".

==== Former senators ====
- Barry Goldwater, former U.S. Senator from Arizona (1953–1965, 1969–1987)
- Mark Hatfield, former U.S. Senator from Oregon (1967–1997)
- Jeff Flake, former U.S. Senator from Arizona (2013–2019)

=== State governors ===
==== Former governors ====
- Chris Sununu, 82nd Governor of New Hampshire (2017–2025) – As a Republican governor of New Hampshire, Sununu has been described as a "moderate-libertarian".
- Gary Johnson, 29th Governor of New Mexico (1995–2003) – served two terms as governor as a Republican and ran for President as a Republican in 2011, but switched from the Republican Party to the Libertarian Party later that year, serving as the Libertarian nominee for president in 2012 and 2016 and running for the U.S. Senate as a Libertarian in 2018.
- Mark Sanford, 115th Governor of South Carolina (2003–2011) (also a former Representative from that state) – a Republican, he's often described as holding libertarian views; claimed to have turned down an offer from Libertarian Party presidential nominee Gary Johnson to be his vice presidential running mate in the 2016 election. During his prior years as a representative on Capitol Hill, he was often identified as an ally of libertarian/conservative Ron Paul while they served in the House together.
- William Weld, 68th Governor of Massachusetts (1991–1997) – As a Republican governor of Massachusetts, Weld self-identified as a libertarian Republican. Later, he drifted toward the Libertarian Party and in 2006, unsuccessfully sought the Republican nomination for New York governor; he gained the Libertarian Party endorsement that year before dropping out of the race. In 2016, Weld joined the Libertarian Party to run for vice president as the running mate of Gary Johnson. In 2019, he rejoined the Republican Party to launch a primary challenge to President Donald Trump.

=== State legislators ===
- Anthony Sabatini, Florida state representative (2018–present) – candidate for 2022 United States House of Representatives elections in Florida for Florida's 7th congressional district. Described as a "libertarian-conservative".

==== Former ====
- Eric Brakey, former Maine state senator (2014–2018) Unsuccessfully ran for U.S. Senate in 2018. Worked for Ron Paul's 2012 campaign, led the Defense of Liberty PAC.
- Nick Freitas, Virginia state Delegate (2016–2026) – Unsuccessfully ran for U.S. Senate in 2018. Described as having a "conservative voting record and libertarian streak."
- Richard Tisei, former Massachusetts state senator and state Senate minority leader; identifies as a "traditional Northeast libertarian" in the social and fiscal senses.

=== Authors and scholars ===
- Nobel Prize–winning economist Milton Friedman

=== Others ===
- Glenn Jacobs, professional wrestler with WWE and current Republican Mayor of Knox County, Tennessee.
- Kennedy, TV commentator and former MTV VJ
- Grover Norquist, anti-tax activist and Republican figure; economic libertarian identified with "support for supply-side economics and skepticism about climate science."
- P. J. O'Rourke, humorist, author – libertarian-conservative Republican, although he endorsed Democratic nominee Hillary Clinton in the 2016 presidential campaign.
- Austin Petersen, former Libertarian Party presidential candidate and former Republican candidate for US Senate in Missouri in 2018.
- Wayne Allyn Root, author and radio host
- Peter Schiff, investment broker – described as "libertarian" or "libertarian-leaning"; unsuccessfully sought the Republican nomination for the 2010 election for U.S. Senate in Connecticut.
- Mark Spitznagel, hedge fund manager
- Peter Thiel, Silicon Valley businessman, PayPal co-founder – a registered Republican and self-described libertarian.
- Vince Vaughn, actor

== See also ==
- Factions in the Republican Party
- Fusionism
- Libertarian conservatism
- Libertarian Democrat
- Libertarian perspectives on political alliances
- Liberty Caucus
- Old Right
- Paleolibertarianism
- Republican Liberty Caucus
- Right-libertarianism
- Rockefeller Republican
- South Park Republican
