= Libertarian perspectives on political alliances =

Libertarian perspectives on political alliances vary greatly, with controversies among libertarians as to which alliances are acceptable or useful to the movement.

== Overview ==
Many right-libertarians are political allies with neoliberals on social issues like the public role of religion (which they seek to minimize at least in government) and nontraditional lifestyles (which they generally defend).

Others, including Murray Rothbard's followers like Lew Rockwell, call themselves paleolibertarians and consider the traditionally religious and protectionist paleoconservatives to be their natural allies despite a sharp disagreement on trade issues. Paleolibertarians accuse other libertarians (whom they call "neo", "left", "lifestyle" and "beltway libertarians") of surrendering libertarian values to the political left in order to gain traction in Washington, D.C., and of undermining morality by opposing or denying religion. Charley Reese of LewRockwell.com said that "a society without an underlying private morality will degenerate into a corrupt jungle. [...] I would rather live in a neighborhood of Islamic fundamentalists than in a neighborhood of atheists and agnostics. [...] [I]f we become an immoral people, we will eventually lose both our prosperity and our liberty".

Friedrich Hayek's arguments in Why I Am Not a Conservative preempted the paleolibertarian movement. He argued that while libertarians (whom he called "liberals") could ally with conservatives in the short term, any fusion of the two movements would undermine their ability to defend liberty. Hayek's essay argues that alliances with conservatives are at best a necessary evil in the fight against state socialism, noting that there are deep incompatibilities because "the admiration of the conservatives for free growth generally applies only to the past. They typically lack the courage to welcome the same undesigned change from which new tools of human endeavors will emerge". Still, Hayek's Road to Serfdom is used by conservatives to support their economic arguments.

Another dimension of the controversy over libertarians' political alliances concerns Objectivists. Right-libertarians are often influenced by Ayn Rand's writings and have a similar agenda to that of Objectivists, but factions of the two groups are often in conflict (see Objectivism and libertarianism).

== See also ==
- Anarcho-capitalism
- Debates within libertarianism
- Electoral alliance
- Green libertarianism
- Left-libertarianism
- Libertarian Democrat
- Libertarian Party (United States)
- Libertarian Republican
- List of libertarian political parties
- New Left
- Old Right
- Outline of libertarianism
- Radical centrism
- Republican Liberty Caucus
- Right-libertarianism
