= Western conservatism (United States) =

Political orientation

Western conservatism is a political orientation prevalent in the Western United States that some might otherwise call libertarian conservatism, Jeffersonian conservatism, or in some circles classical liberalism, typified by politicians like Theodore Roosevelt, Barry Goldwater, Ronald Reagan, Ron and Rand Paul and Rick Perry. It has been described as a soft-libertarian ideology that focuses on economic rather than social issues, one which strongly embraces individual freedom and opposes an expanded role for government.

== Differences with other ideologies ==
Western conservatives differ from purist libertarians in that most tend to oppose legal abortion believing government bans on the medical procedure to be more of a state and not federal issue; foreign policy in Iraq and Afghanistan ought be driven by a clearly defined mission and exit strategy; and immediate legalization or decriminalization of drugs is not a practical near-term solution.

On the other hand, Western conservatives differ from neoconservatives in that they tend to believe there should be a natural or practical separation of church and state, military presence throughout the world should be significantly less than it is now and that a premium placed on privacy trumps most any rationale behind the USA PATRIOT Act or Real ID Act.
