= Republican Liberty Caucus =

Political action organization in the United States

- Chairman: John Dennis (CA)
- Secretary: Jessico Bowman (FL)
- Vice-chairman: Ben Beckhart (KY)
- Treasurer: Matt Nye (FL)
- Founded: 1991
- Headquarters: Washington, D.C.
- Ideology: Classical liberalism Right-libertarianism
- National affiliation: Republican Party

Website
- rlc.org

The Republican Liberty Caucus (RLC) is a political action organization dedicated to promoting the ideals of individual liberty, limited government and free market economics within the Republican Party in the United States. It is part of the libertarian wing of the Republican Party. It also operates a political action committee, the RLC-USA PAC.

The organization was founded in 1991 and has chapters in many states. In 2011, the organization hosted its National Convention in Arlington, Virginia. The 2013 convention was held in Austin, Texas and the 2015 National Convention was hosted in Nashua, New Hampshire.

RLC logo in 2006

== Issues ==
The RLC works within the Republican Party to influence the party to adopt the RLC's agenda. As activist Tom Heitman put it, "We're trying to reintroduce the Republican platform to the Republican Party."

The RLC favors individual freedom and limited government. Specifically, the RLC favors reduced government intrusion, lower taxes, elimination of federal agencies, less regulation, a strong national defense with fewer military bases abroad, and no foreign aid.

In 2010, the Republican Liberty Caucus of Texas denounced the new state Republican Party platform that supported criminalization of sodomy and making same-sex marriage a felony.

== Leadership ==
| No. | Image | Chairman | Term | State | Notes |
|---|---|---|---|---|---|
| 1 | | Eric Rittberg | 1991–1992 | Florida | |
| 2 | | Roger MacBride | 1992–1995 | Florida | |
| 3 | | Ron Paul | 1995–2000 | Texas | |
| 4 | | Chuck Muth | 2000–2001 | Nevada | |
| 5 | | Ron Paul | 2001–2002 | Texas | (Honorary) |
| 6 | | Douglas Lorenz | 2002–2004 | California | |
| 7 | | Bill Westmiller | 2004–2009 | California | |
| 8 | | Shepard Humphries | 2007–2008 | Wyoming | |
| 9 | | Dave Nalle | 2009–2013 | Texas | |
| 10 | | Matthew Nye | 2013–2023 | Florida | |
| 11 | | John Dennis | 2023–Present | California | |

== Endorsements ==
=== Presidential endorsements ===
The Republican Liberty Caucus' process for endorsing presidential candidates is described in the organization's Bylaws and Rules:

A candidate for President of the United States may be endorsed by the Caucus by a 2/3 vote of the active and voting Chartered state's executive committees. The national Secretary shall notify all Chartered states of a favorable national board proposal for endorsement and state executive officers shall inform the Secretary of the approval or denial by their executive committee within 60 days.

Since the Caucus' founding in 1991, only four candidates have reached this level of support: Steve Forbes 1996, Ron Paul in 2012, Rand Paul in 2016, and Donald Trump in 2024. When Forbes ran again in 2000, the organization remained neutral in that primary and did not endorse another specific Republican candidate in any presidential primary until December 30, 2011, when the RLC endorsed Ron Paul for President. In 2016, his son Rand Paul was also endorsed by the RLC. On September 10, 2024, the RLC announced their endorsement of Donald Trump on their Facebook page.

=== Notable 2012 endorsements ===
On November 2, 2011, the Republican Liberty Caucus announced its first two endorsements in the 2012 election: Barry Hinckley, ran in the Republican primary in Rhode Island, and Brian K. Hill, ran in the Republican primary in Connecticut. The Republican nominee in Rhode Island challenged Democratic United States Senator Sheldon Whitehouse while the Republican nominee in Connecticut ran for an open seat being vacated by independent United States Senator Joseph Lieberman.

- Republican Presidential Candidate Ron Paul from Texas
- Ted Cruz of Texas for U.S. Senate
- Barry Hinckley of Rhode Island for U.S. Senate
- U.S. Representative Tom McClintock for California's Congressional District 4
- Judge Executive Thomas Massie for Kentucky's Congressional District 4
- U.S. Representative Justin Amash for Michigan's Congressional District 3
- Kerry Bentivolio for Michigan's Congressional District 11
- Sheriff Richard Mack for Texas' Congressional District 21
- Steve Stockman for Texas' Congressional District 36
- Karen Kwiatkowski for Virginia's Congressional District 6
- Floyd Bayne for Virginia's Congressional District 7
- Dan Halloran for New York's Congressional District 6

=== Notable 2014 endorsements ===
- Matt Bevin of Kentucky for U.S. Senate
- Milton R. Wolf of Kansas for U.S. Senate
- Owen Hill of Colorado for U.S. Senate
- Lee Bright of South Carolina for U.S. Senate
- Pat McGeehan of West Virginia for U.S. Senate
- Bruce Poliquin for Maine's 2nd congressional district

=== Notable 2016 endorsements ===
- Republican Presidential Candidate Rand Paul from Kentucky

=== Notable 2018 endorsements ===
- Eric Brakey of Maine for U.S. Senate
- Austin Petersen of Missouri for U.S. Senate
- Nick Freitas of Virginia for U.S. Senate

=== Notable 2024 endorsements ===
- Former President Donald Trump for President
- Matt Gaetz for Florida's 1st congressional district
- Byron Donalds for Florida's 19th congressional district
- Marjorie Taylor Greene for Georgia's 14th congressional district
- Andrew Ogles for Tennessee's 5th congressional district

== See also ==
- Constitutionalism
- Factions in the Republican Party
- Fusionism
- Freedom Caucus
- Libertarian conservatism
- Libertarian Party
- Libertarian perspectives on political alliances
- Libertarian Republican
- Liberty Caucus
- Neo-libertarianism
- Paleolibertarianism
- Right-libertarianism
- South Park Republican
