= Right or Wrong =

Right or Wrong may refer to:

== Albums ==
- Right or Wrong (George Strait album), 1983
- Right or Wrong (Ronnie Dove album), 1964
- Right or Wrong (Rosanne Cash album) or the title song, 1980
- Right or Wrong (Stealers Wheel album) or the title song, 1975
- Right or Wrong (Wanda Jackson album) or the title song (see below), 1961

== Songs ==
- "Right or Wrong" (1921 song), written by Arthur Sizemore and Paul Biese; covered by George Strait, 1983
- "Right or Wrong" (Wanda Jackson song), 1961; covered by Ronnie Dove, 1964
- "Right or Wrong", by Praga Khan from Soundscraper, 2006
- "Right or Wrong", by YoungBoy Never Broke Again from Until Death Call My Name, 2018

== See also ==
- Right Yaa Wrong (lit. 'Right or Wrong'), a 2010 Indian film
- Right and wrong (disambiguation)
- The Right and the Wrong, a 1970 Trinidadian film
