= Libertarian perspectives on foreign intervention =

Libertarian perspectives on foreign intervention started as a reaction to the Cold War mentality of military interventionism promoted by American conservatives, including William F. Buckley Jr., who supplanted Old Right non-interventionism.

The Vietnam War split the uneasy alliance between growing numbers of self-identified libertarians and the Cold War conservatives. Libertarians opposed to the war joined the draft resistance and peace movements and created organizations such as Students for a Democratic Society. The split was aggravated at the 1969 Young Americans for Freedom convention where the burning of a draft card sparked physical confrontations among convention attendees, a walkout by many libertarians, and the creation of antiwar libertarian organizations.

Left-libertarians generally oppose foreign military intervention on anti-imperialist grounds, while right-libertarians also generally oppose foreign military intervention and generally oppose all government foreign aid as well. In the United States, the Libertarian Party opposes strategic alliances between the United States and foreign nations.

== Overview ==
Anti-war and non-interventionist American libertarians were highly influenced by economist Murray Rothbard and author Karl Hess. Rothbard criticized imperialism and the rise of the American empire which needed war to sustain itself and to expand its global control. Rothbard said: "Our entry into World War II was the crucial act in foisting a permanent militarization upon the economy and society, in bringing to the country a permanent garrison state, an overweening military–industrial complex, a permanent system of conscription". This tradition is continued in the anti-war analysis of the Cato Institute's David Boaz and former Representative Ron Paul.

Some libertarians have criticized conservatives and those libertarian conservatives who supported the United States' 2001 invasion of Afghanistan and 2003 invasion of Iraq and subsequent occupations. However, others like Randy Barnett and John Hospers supported the Iraq War. In 2010, the Libertarian Party criticized conservatives for supporting a "trillion-dollar foreign war".

Some libertarians also criticize from a libertarian perspective the actions of foreign governments like Saudi Arabia and Israel. In "War Guilt in the Middle East", Rothbard details Israel's "aggression against Middle East Arabs", confiscatory policies and its "refusal to let these refugees return and reclaim the property taken from them". Rothbard also criticized the "organized Anti-Anti-Semitism" that critics of the state of Israel have to suffer. In "Property Rights and the 'Right of Return'", professor Richard Ebeling writes: "If a settlement is reached between the Israelis and the Palestinians, justice would suggest that all legitimate property should be returned to its rightful owners and that residence by those owners on their property should be once again permitted". In "The Alienation of a Homeland: How Palestine Became Israel", attorney Stephen P. Halbrook writes: "Palestinian Arabs have the rights to return to their homes and estates taken over by Israelis, to receive just compensation for loss of life and property, and to exercise national self-determination".

Even though the writers behind Ayn Rand Institute and Ayn Rand Lexicon define themselves as Objectivists and are more often opposed to libertarians, large minorities of right-libertarians, mainly in the United states, use aspects of Ayn Rand's Objectivism to justify their foreign policy beliefs on the right of defense. A very common view on dictatorship among these is the view that a dictatorial society is an outlaw that can claim no rights and that any free society has a right to forcibly change any dictatorial society into another free one, but should absolutely not assume this to be any kind of self-sacrificial duty. When it comes to broader American foreign policy, these libertarians believe that the crux of American foreign policy should be free trade, including abolition of protectionism as a corporatist element. Many libertarians will argue from perspectives most associated with Ayn Rand Institute to justify siding with Israel over the Arab League, regarding the war that the Arab League launched against Israel in 1948. Some libertarians will use Objectivist arguments to criticize the tendency of many of their own to focus on trivial crimes by free societies instead of severe crimes by tyrannical societies.

Pew Research Center found overwhelmingly in 2011, with new and updated data in 2014, that libertarians in the United States are about as close to evenly split as normal Americans on foreign policy. In 2014, they found through polling that 54% of libertarians oppose American involvement overseas and that 43% are in favor of it. The finding unique to the 2014 polling is that libertarian opinion on whether American involvement overseas does more harm than good is almost evenly split as 47% say no while 46% say yes. Regarding foreign policy views since 2011, libertarians side more with multilateralism over unilateralism, more with realism over idealism, more with opposing the end of Gaddafi over supporting it, more with supporting quick end to the Afghan War over opposing quick end, more with friendliness to China over hostility, are evenly split over trade deals, side more with opposing the United Nations over supporting them and more with seeing Islam as Earth's most tyrannical organized religion over seeing some other religion as such. It has also been found in both years' reports that nearly all libertarians oppose privacy compromises like the Patriot Act. Distinguishing military policy from foreign policy, one will find that libertarian views on foreign policy are almost evenly divided between those who are more often diplomatic and those who are more often militant. A nearly half minority (48%) believe that the best way for American military to ensure peace on earth is to stay the strongest military of Earth, and an identically sized minority also think that the best way to defeat a terroristic ideology is to overwhelmingly and militarily crush that ideology on its soil.

== See also ==
- Alliance of Libertarian Activists
