= Yombe maternity figures =

Mother and child sculptures

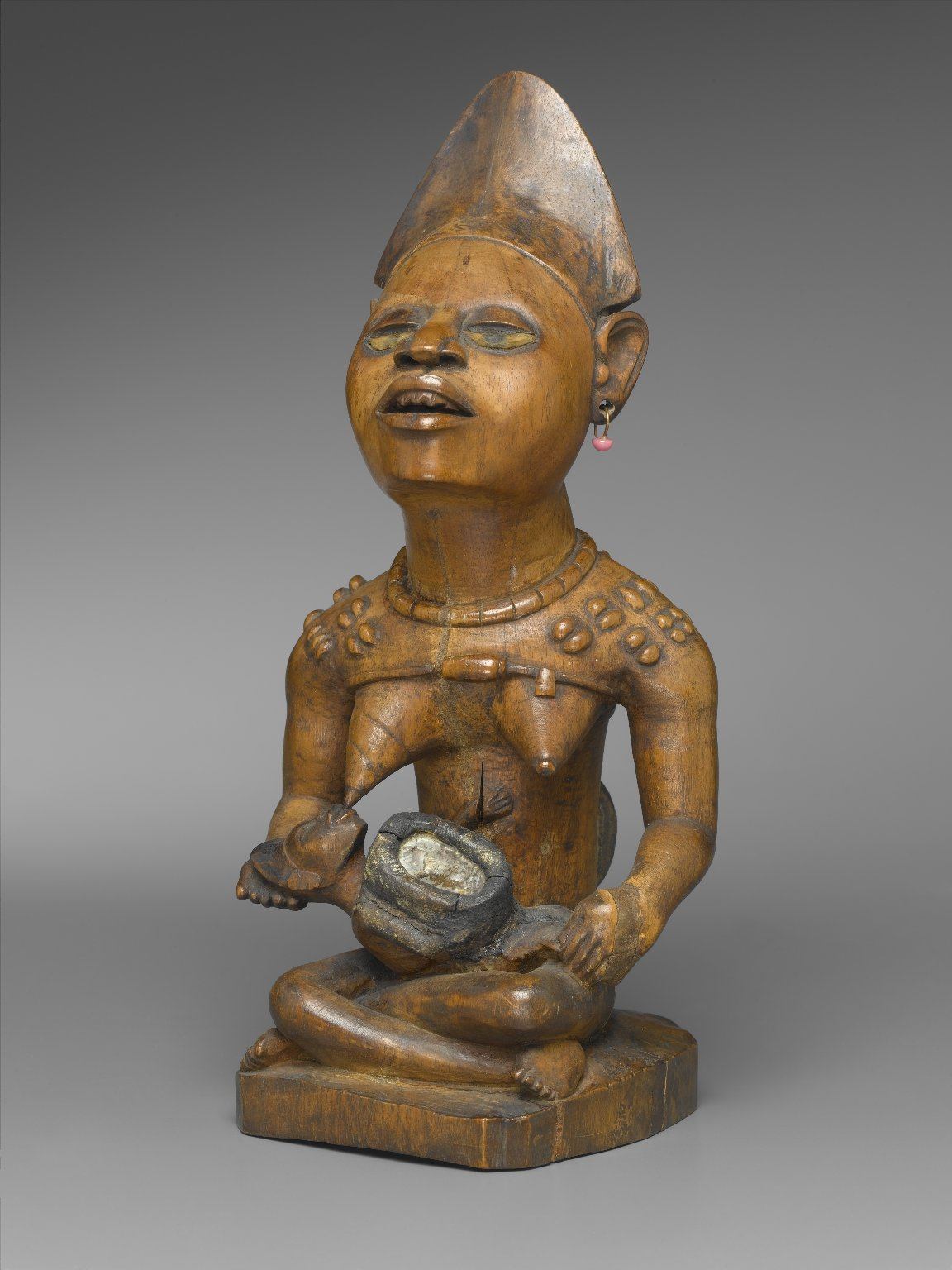
Phemba from the collection of the Brooklyn Museum

Phemba, also known as Yombe maternity figures, refers to sculptural objects that depict the figures of a mother and child. Phemba statuary falls into two groups: mothers cradling or holding their babies, and mothers nursing. They are also commonly made from carved wood with intricate scarification.

Phemba are iconic examples of Kongo art and according to Thompson (1981) "reflect the degree to which women are treasured in Kongo culture, not just for their fecundity, but as seers and guardians of the spirit". The Kikongo word phemba translates to "the white", in reference to the white earth (Kaolinite) that is a sign of fertility in the region. The name is interpreted by John M. Janzen (1979) as denoting "'the one who gives children in-potentia.' A phemba child is a magically conceived nkisi child, a fragile emissary of the spirit world."

Kongo societies are matrilineal. The very different styles of maternity figures illustrate regional and even personal variations on the same theme. There are many speculations around what Phembas are supposed to represent.

It's commonly believed that Phemba are used to promote fertility in women. Depending on the figure, it's been suggested that Phemba could've depicted the mother of the chief, the principal wife of the chief, or in the case of a figure with a supine child, a wife of the chief whose child had died, and functioned as royal images or memorials. Phemba could also represent ancestral statues representing the founding mother of the Yombe tribe. It's also possible that Phemba are related to a women's fertility cult founded by a famous midwife what was concerned with fertility and the treatment of infertility. In special cases, communities honored women by commissioning stone icons depicting a mother and child to be placed on their tombs. This was also considered dangerous, as it represented an insertion of the source of life - the mother – into the world of the dead.

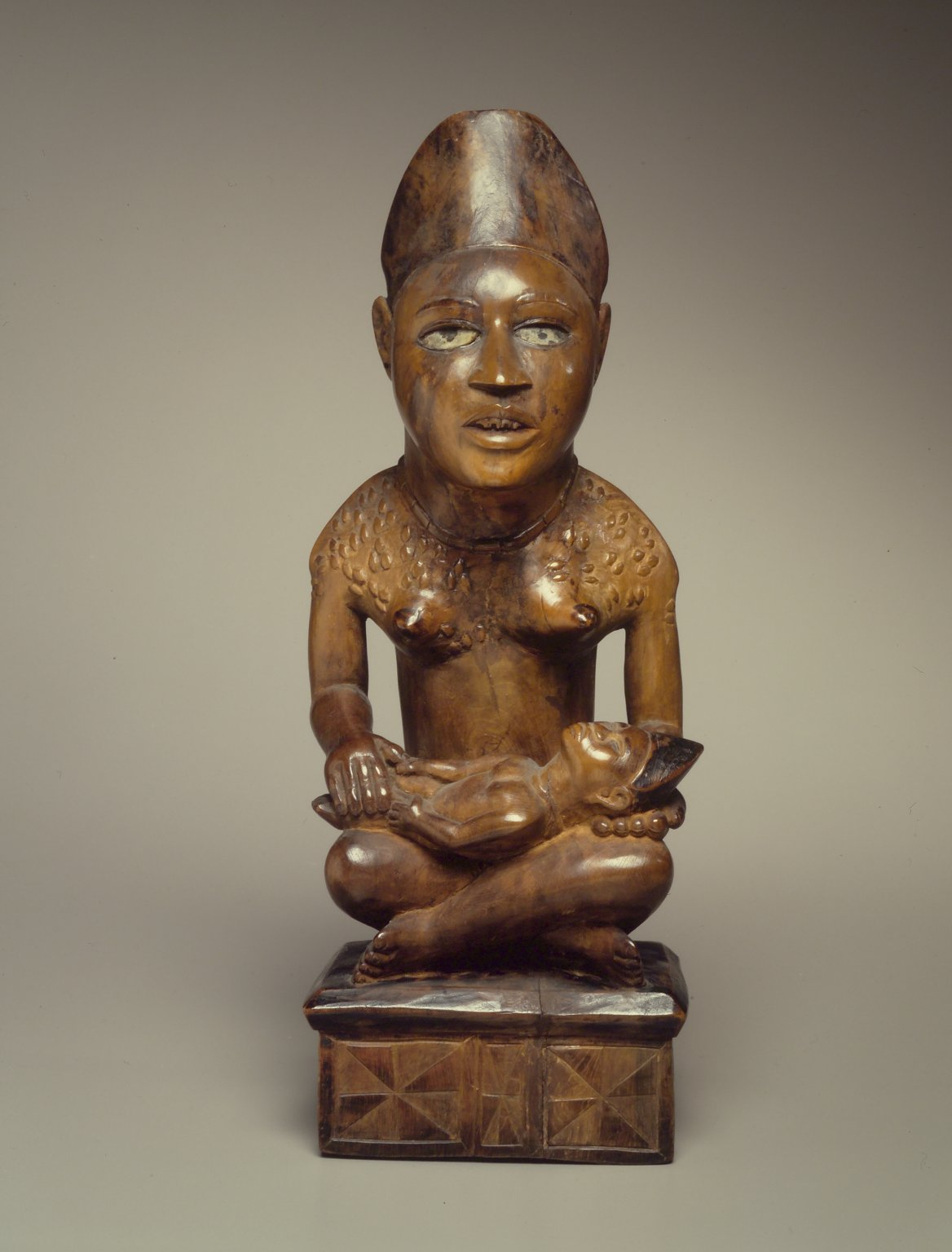
Phemba from the collection of the Brooklyn Museum

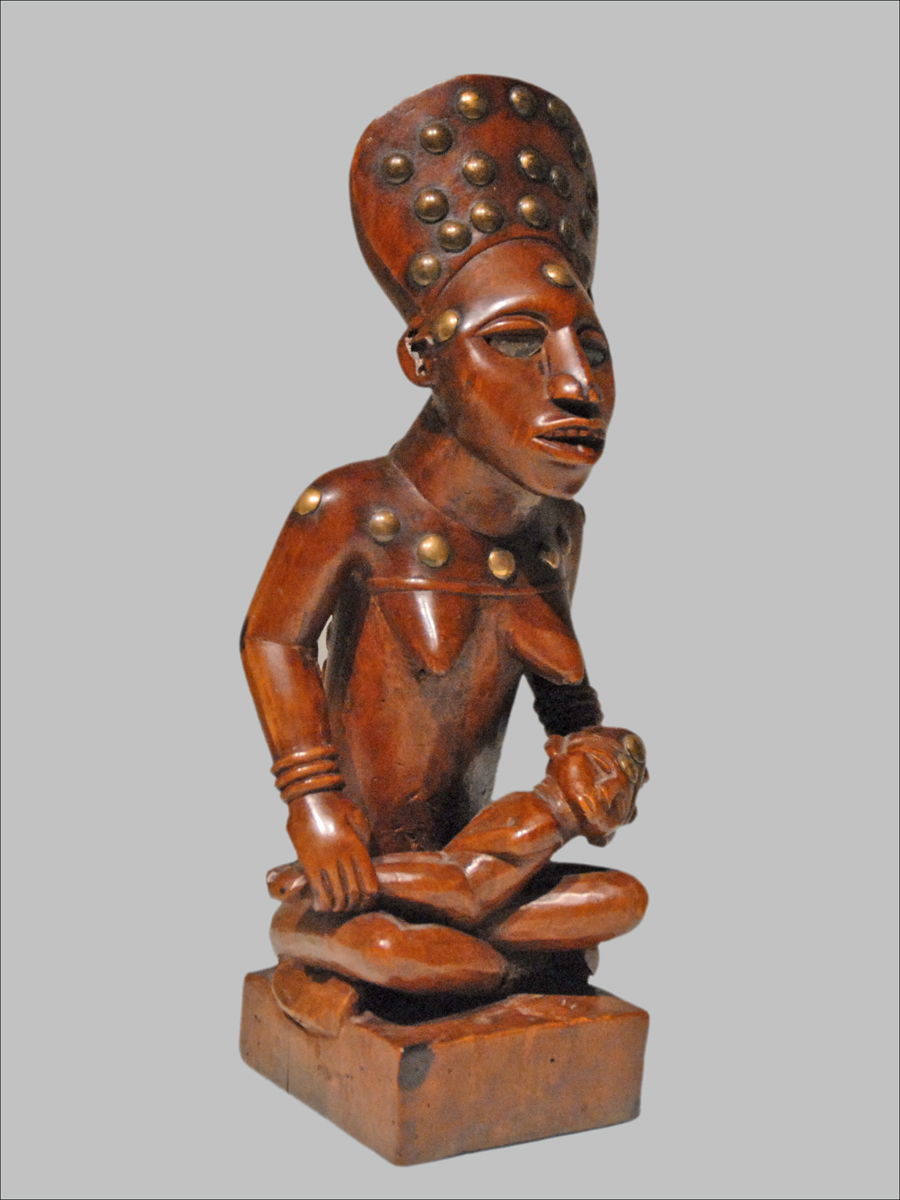
A Phemba sculpture from a private collection in France

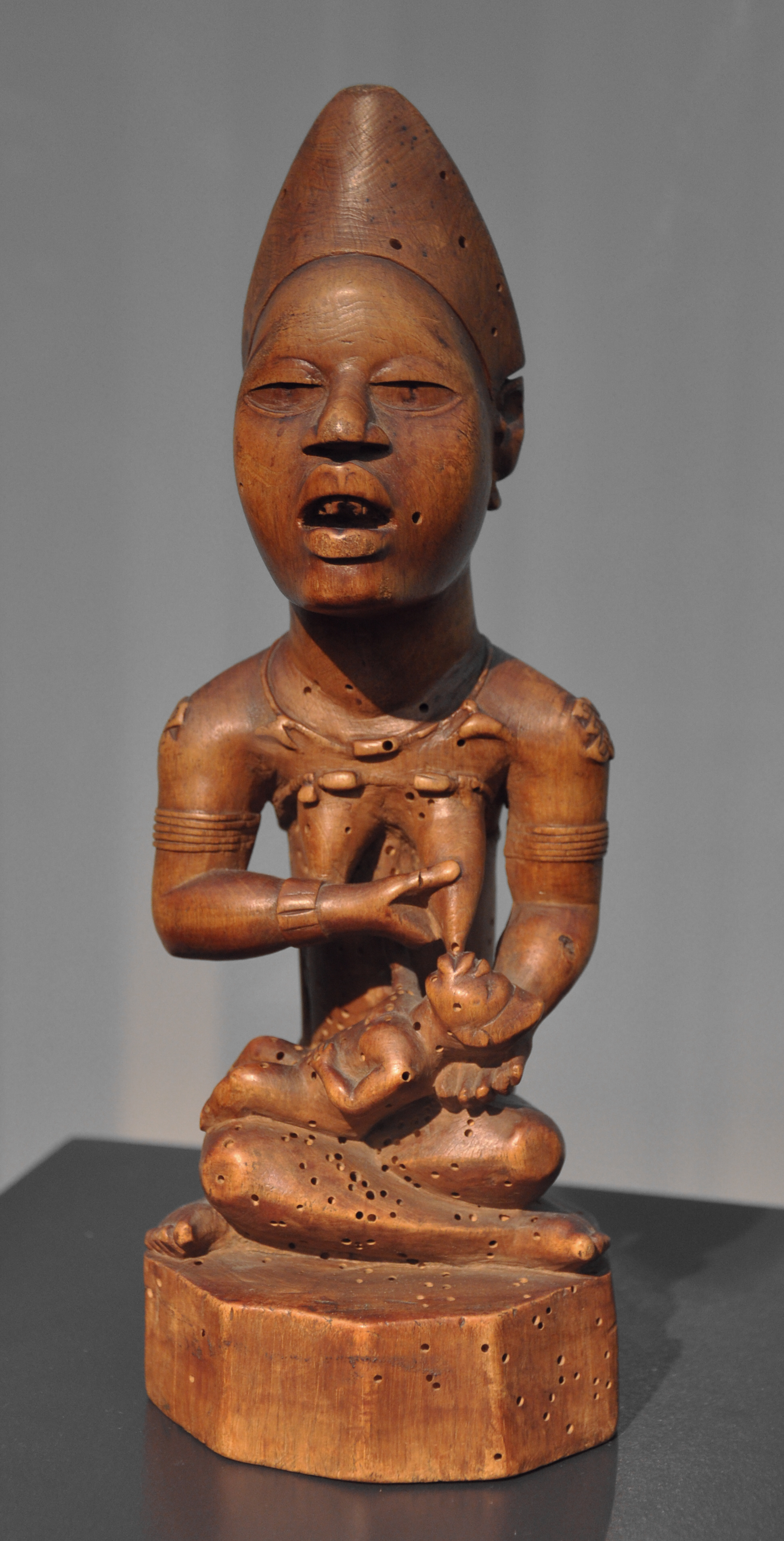
A Phemba sculpture from Museum Rietberg in Switzerland.

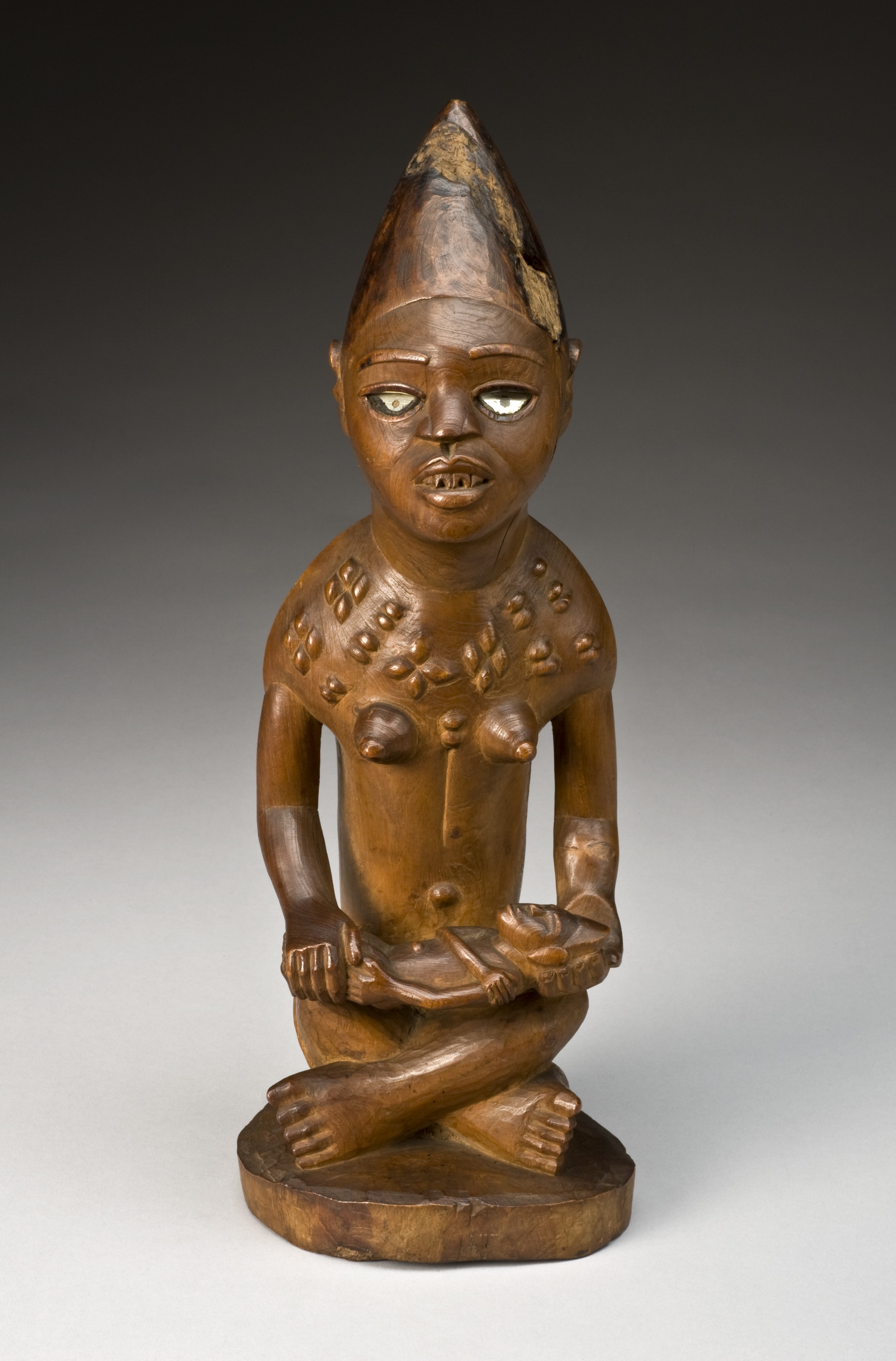
A Phemba sculpture from Sir Henry Wellcome's Museum Collection

== See also ==
- Nkisi
- Nkondi
