= Right and wrong =

Right and wrong may refer to:

- Ethics, or moral philosophy, a branch of philosophy that involves systematizing, defending, and recommending concepts of right and wrong behavior
- Morality, the differentiation of intentions, decisions and actions between those that are distinguished as proper and those that are improper
- "Right and Wrong" (song), by Joe Jackson, 1986

== See also ==
- Right or Wrong (disambiguation)
