= Liberty Caucus =

Former US Congressional group

House Liberty Caucus
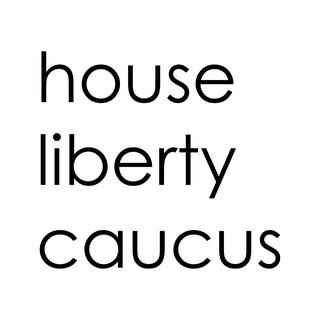
- Chairman: Warren Davidson (Note: As of November 2023, the list of congressional member organizations for the 118th Congress includes the Congressional Liberty Caucus. Rep. Warren Davidson is listed as its leader.)
- Founded: 2011; 15 years ago
- Preceded by: Liberty Caucus; Tea Party Caucus
- Ideology: Conservatism; Libertarianism; Libertarian conservatism
- Political position: Right-wing
- Colors: Red

Website
- www.facebook.com/libertycaucus

The House Liberty Caucus is a congressional caucus consisting of libertarian, libertarian conservative, and libertarian-leaning conservative members of the United States House of Representatives.

Prior to the formal creation of the House Liberty Caucus, Rep. Ron Paul hosted a luncheon in Washington, D.C. every Thursday for a group of Republican members of the House of Representatives that he called the Liberty Caucus. The group's proposition was similar to the political action committee known as the Republican Liberty Caucus and "support[ed] individual rights, limited government and free enterprise".

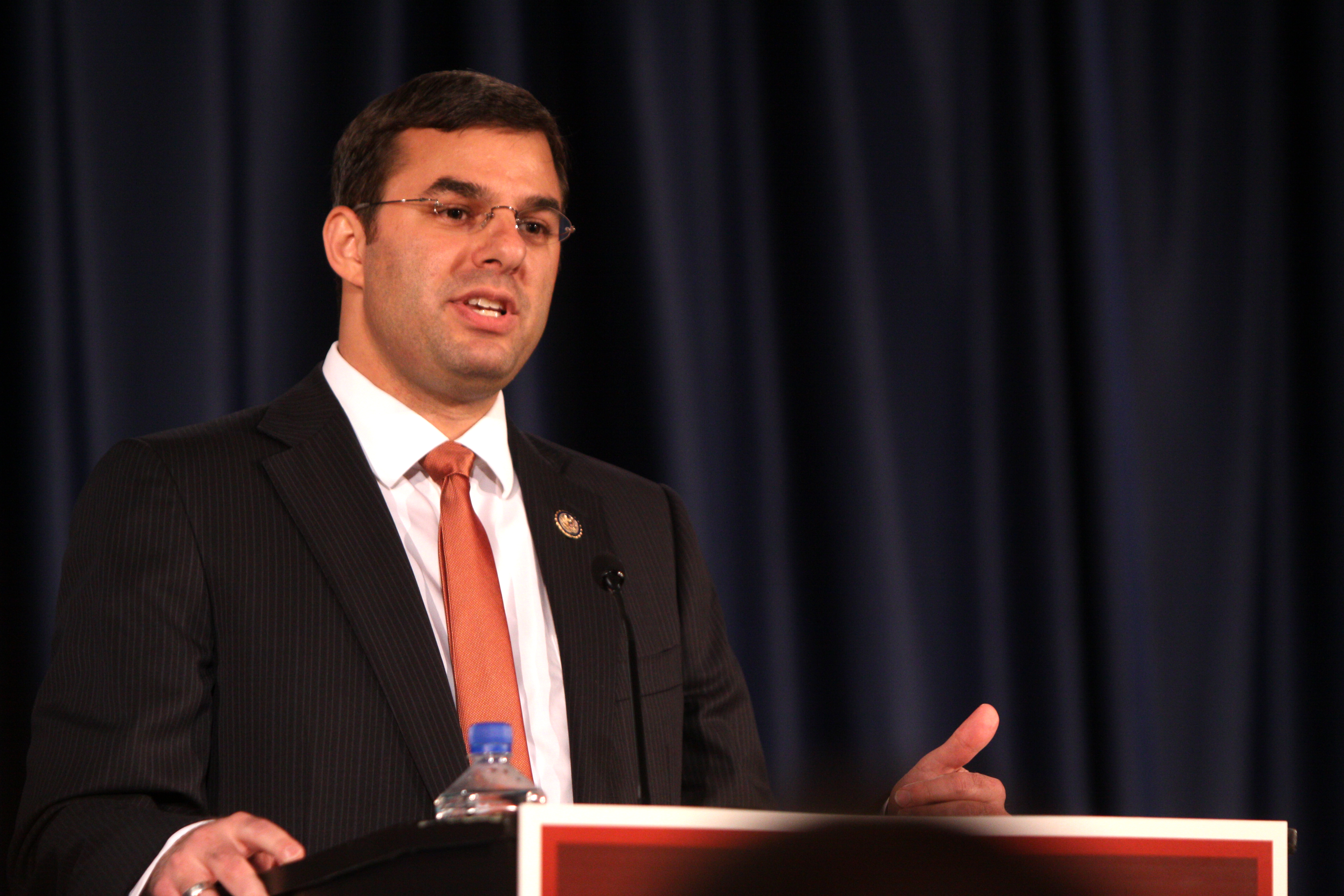
Justin Amash, founder and chairman of the Liberty Caucus

After the 112th Congress began and Ron Paul switched his focus to his presidential campaign, his luncheon was replaced by a formal congressional member organization. That member organization was named the House Liberty Caucus and was initially chaired by Justin Amash. The House Liberty Caucus was joined by Republican members who wanted to "focus on specific issues like economic freedom, individual liberty, and following the Constitution". During his time in Congress, Jared Polis of Colorado was the only Democratic member of the caucus. The caucus has been characterized as "conservative with a libertarian emphasis" and was associated with the Tea Party movement. In June 2014, the caucus supported Raúl Labrador's campaign for House Majority Leader. In February 2019, Politico reported that the House Liberty Caucus had eight members.

As of November 2023, Rep. Warren Davidson is listed as the leader of the Congressional Liberty Caucus.

== Members ==
=== Current members ===
- Andy Biggs of Arizona. Running for governor of Arizona in 2026
- Warren Davidson of Ohio
- Paul Gosar of Arizona
- Morgan Griffith of Virginia
- Jim Jordan of Ohio
- Thomas Massie of Kentucky (Lost renomination)
- Scott Perry of Pennsylvania (Lost re-election)
- Tim Walberg of Michigan

=== Former members ===
- Justin Amash of Michigan – retired in 2020
- Kerry Bentivolio of Michigan – lost renomination in 2014
- Paul Broun of Georgia – ran unsuccessfully for the Senate in 2014
- Jason Chaffetz of Utah – resigned in 2017
- Curt Clawson of Florida – retired in 2016
- Scott Garrett of New Jersey – defeated in 2016 general election
- Tom Graves of Georgia – resigned in 2020
- Vicky Hartzler of Missouri – ran unsuccessfully for the 2022 United States Senate election in Missouri
- Tim Huelskamp of Kansas – lost renomination in 2016
- Walter Jones of North Carolina – died 2019
- Cynthia Lummis of Wyoming – retired from the House in 2016. Later elected to Senate in 2020.
- Mick Mulvaney of South Carolina – appointed as Director of the Office of Management and Budget in 2017
- Jared Polis of Colorado (Democrat) – ran successfully for 2018 Colorado gubernatorial election, currently Governor of Colorado. Polis was the only Democratic member of the Liberty Caucus.
- Cathy McMorris Rodgers of Washington
- Matt Salmon of Arizona – retired in 2016
- Steve Stockman of Texas – ran unsuccessfully for the Senate in 2014
- Marlin Stutzman of Indiana – ran unsuccessfully for the Senate in 2016
- Rob Woodall of Georgia – retired in 2020

== See also ==
- Freedom Caucus
- Libertarian Republican
- Libertarian conservatism
- Republican Liberty Caucus
- Republican Study Committee
- Second Amendment Caucus
- Tea Party Caucus
- Tea Party movement
