= Chuck Muth =

Political consultant

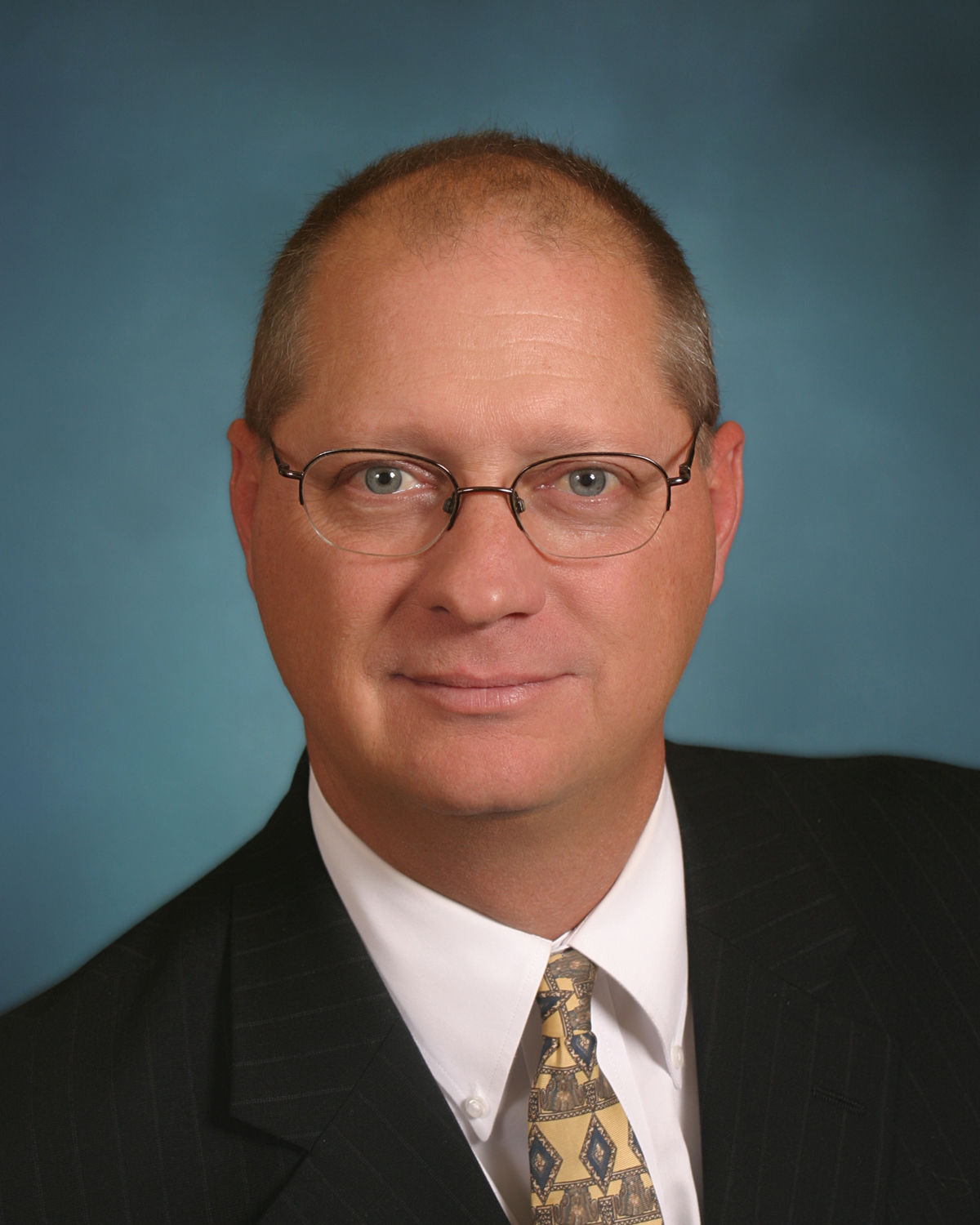
- Born: April 5, 1959 (age 67)
- Occupation: Consultant
- Spouse: Gia (m. 1994)
- Children: 3

Chuck Muth is the president of Citizen Outreach, a conservative organization based in Las Vegas, and of Citizen Outreach Foundation. He is also a freelance communications consultant.

He is a former executive director of the American Conservative Union, a national chairman of the Republican Liberty Caucus, a Clark County, Nevada, GOP chairman, and former Nevada Republican Party executive director.

Muth is a blogger, publisher of NevadaNewsandViews.com, an independent freelance columnist, an author, and a regular guest on political and public affairs TV and radio programs.

Muth has had running feuds with multiple members of the Nevada GOP, including recently appointed interim U.S. Attorney for Nevada, Sigal Chattah, who he referred to as a "deranged lunatic."

He lives in Las Vegas with his wife Gia and their three children.
