= Yombe people (Congo and Angola) =

Central African ethnic group

Yombe
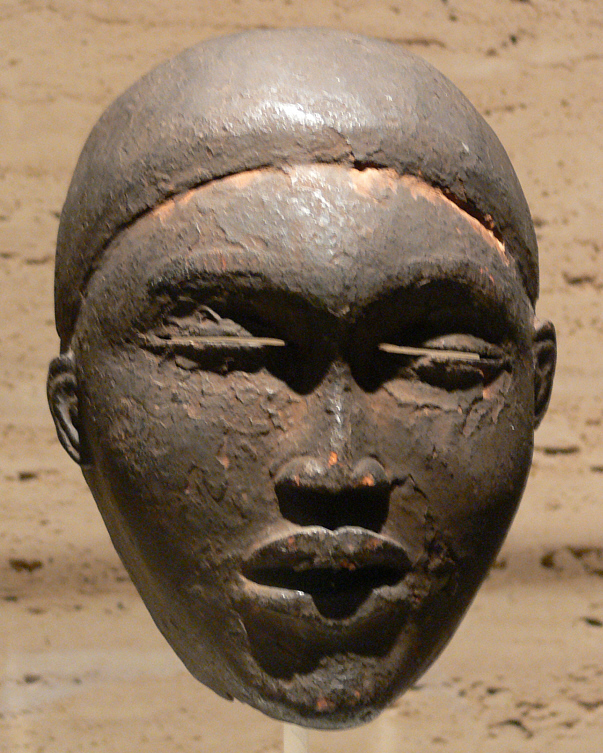
- Diviner's Mask

Total population
- 15,000+ (1981)

Regions with significant populations
- Zambia, Republic of the Congo, the Democratic Republic of the Congo, Angola

Related ethnic groups
- Tumbuka, Kongo

The Yombe people of Congo and Angola are a Bantu ethnic group of Republic of the Congo, the Democratic Republic of the Congo and Angola. Adept at crafts and art, the men are involved in weaving, carving, and smelting, and the women make clay pots. Popular figures include the Nkisi nkonde and female phemba statues.

== Distribution ==
In 1981, there was an estimated number of 15,000 Yombe people, living in an area of 625 square miles (1,620 km^{2}). Another group, also referred to as the Yombe people, live in the south-western part of the Republic of the Congo, with others living in the Democratic Republic of the Congo and Angola.

== Economic practices ==
The Yombe are primarily involved in agricultural production, growing crops such as plantains, maize, beans, manioc, peanuts, and yams. Though they grow primarily for food supply, they also sell their crops at the market. Goats, pigs and chickens are raised and fishing is practiced on the Congo River.

== Cultural and religious practices ==
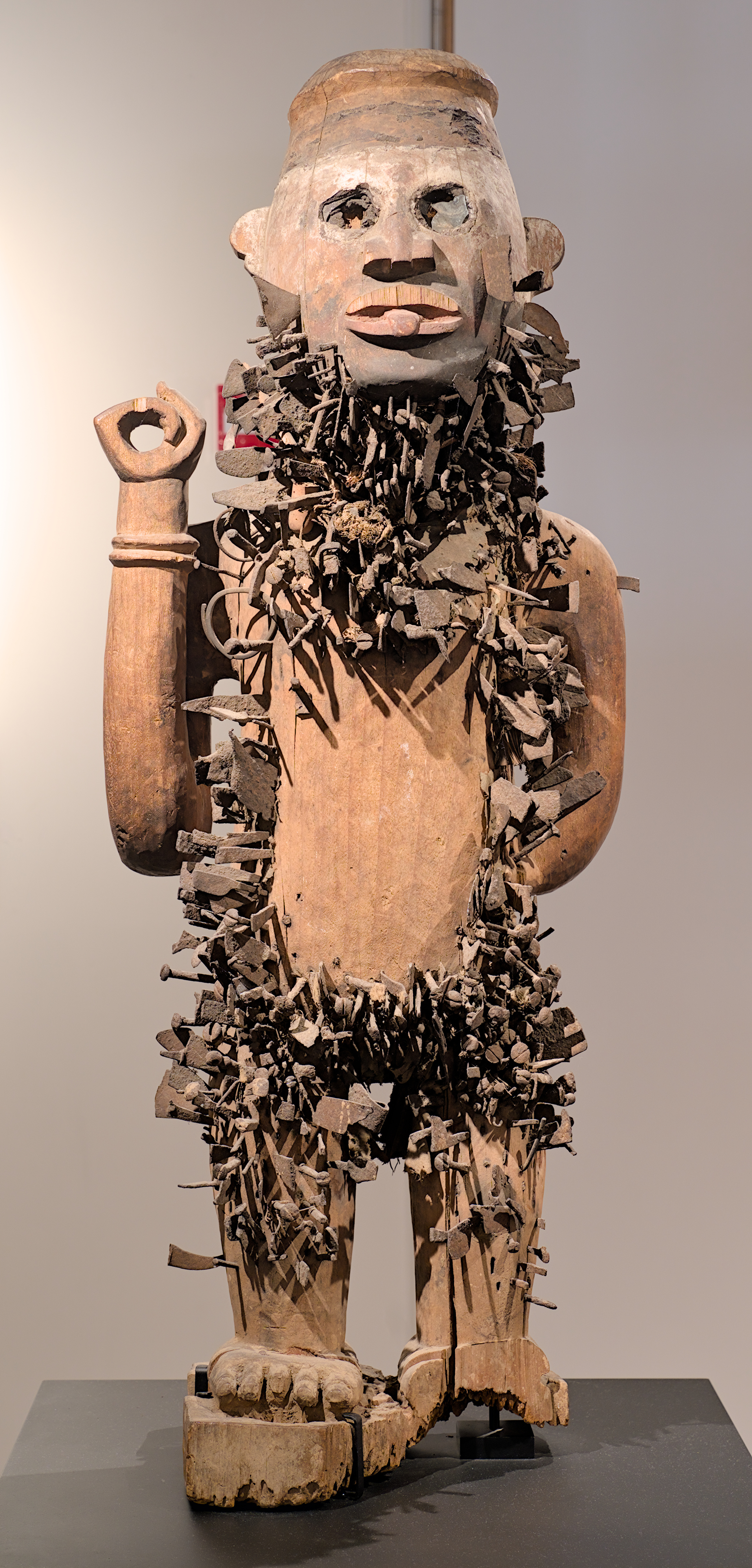
Yombe sculpture in Musée L, Louvain-la-Neuve

The artistry of Yombe figurines and statues is well known, usually objects of prestige, kings seated on the throne, or female phemba (maternity) statues. Nkisi nkonde figurines, masks and drums are also made for ceremonies. Their funerary figures are renowned for their realistic depictions.

The supreme deity of the Yombe is Ngoma Bunzi, who hails from an unreachable realm called Yulu. He is contacted via Nzambi a Tsi (earth spirits) and Simbi (river spirits). The Yombe people build shrines as memorials to prominent ancestors, such as village chiefs who has special powers. The Yombe people of northern Zambia believe that people have three different identities: biological, social, and spiritual. Their social standing affects the type of funeral which might be given.
