= Factions in the Libertarian Party (United States) =

Ideological and political wings of the Libertarian Party

The Libertarian Party in the United States is composed of various factions, sometimes described as left and right, although many libertarians reject use of these terms to describe their political philosophy.

As of 2025, notable caucuses within the party include the hardline and paleolibertarian Mises Caucus, the traditionalist Classical Liberal Caucus, the mainly anarcho-capitalist Radical Caucus, and the left-wing Libertarian Socialist Caucus. There are also smaller groups such as the Pro Life Caucus and Bitcoin Caucus.

== History ==
A broad coalition of classical liberals, minarchists, and anarcho-capitalists founded the Libertarian Party in 1971. In 1974, the larger minarchist and smaller anarcho-capitalist factions held the Libertarian National Convention in Dallas and made the "Dallas Accord". It is an implicit agreement to compromise between factions by adopting a platform that explicitly did not say whether it was desirable for the state to exist.

Over the years, anarcho-capitalists continued to debate and clash with minarchists in the party. The former faction has seen an upswing with the re-formalization of the LPRadicals. When the anarchist-aligned Ron Paul sought the 1988 Libertarian Party nomination for president. However, many saw Paul as too radical and supported Native American activist Russell Means to run against him. Nevertheless, Paul won the nomination and ran a Libertarian presidential campaign.

After the Ron Paul 1988 presidential campaign, Paul supporters like Murray Rothbard and Lew Rockwell labeled themselves "paleolibertarians" because of their culturally conservative views. They soon left the party and later abandoned the term. Following the formation of the paleolibertarian faction, some American conservatives left the Republican Party to join the Libertarian Party. After the September 11th attacks, some conservative libertarians supported the war in Afghanistan and the Iraq War.

Over the years, the number of anarcho-capitalists in the party dropped by about half. During the 2006 Libertarian National Convention, delegates deleted a large portion of the party's detailed platform. They added the phrase: "Government exists to protect the rights of every individual including life, liberty and property." Some took this as meaning the Dallas Accord was dead. Many anarcho-capitalists in the party left and started the Boston Tea Party in 2006, which was disbanded six years later. In 2020, the Libertarian Party nominated Jeremy "Spike" Cohen for vice president, the first anarcho-capitalist to be featured on the party's presidential ticket. In 2022, the paleolibertarian Mises Caucus swept control of all positions in the Libertarian National Committee. In response to the paleolibertarians' control over the party, numerous state parties disaffiliated from the Libertarian Party and others suffered splits and separations.

== Current caucuses ==
=== Classical Liberal Caucus ===
The Classical Liberal Caucus promotes classical liberalism and has been described as traditionalist. It was founded in 2022 by Jonathan Casey, with the stated goal of promoting a professional and policy-based message within the Libertarian Party. The Caucus argues that the Libertarian Party should adopt a classical liberal message of individualism to appeal to Americans in the political center disillusioned with the Democratic and Republican parties. It was associated with the Chase Oliver 2024 presidential campaign.

=== Mises Caucus ===
The Mises Caucus promotes paleolibertarianism, Fusionism, as well as a more conservative version of American libertarianism associated with the presidential campaigns of former U.S. congressman Ron Paul. It was founded in 2017 by Michael Heise, mainly in opposition to Nicholas Sarwark's position as party chairman and the influence of the Pragmatist Caucus. It is named after economist Ludwig von Mises.

The caucus has the support of some prominent libertarians, such as comedian Dave Smith, political commentator Tom Woods, and radio host Scott Horton. The caucus has also been highly controversial, and has been accused by their critics of harboring bigotry or being plants of the Republican Party, which the Mises Caucus denies.

The Mises Caucus has shifted the Libertarian Party further toward the right ever since their party’s national convention in May 2022. After the 2024 Libertarian National Convention, the Mises Caucus controlled the positions of Secretary and Chair on the Libertarian National Committee, as well as a majority of state affiliates. However, the Secretary's affiliation with the Mises Caucus ended shortly thereafter because of the Mises-controlled Libertarian Party of Colorado's attempt to replace the properly selected Libertarian Presidential nominee, Chase Oliver, on the Colorado ballot.

=== Radical Caucus ===
The Radical Caucus (also known as LPRadicals) promotes more radical libertarian thought. It supports abolitionism of government functions and agencies instead of incremental changes to the status quo. The caucus was created in 2006 by members of the party unhappy with that year's party platform. It opposed Gary Johnson in the 2016 Libertarian Party presidential primaries.

=== Libertarian Socialist Caucus ===
The Libertarian Socialist Caucus (also known as the LSC) is a small, left-wing faction within the Libertarian Party.

=== LPAlliance ===
LPAlliance is an inter-caucus coalition within the Libertarian Party that seeks to rebuild and revolutionize the party through a “liberty first strategy” prioritizing libertarian leadership, activism, and principles both within and outside the party."Who We Are". LPAlliance. It brings together members of diverse libertarian tendencies, including radicals, anarchists, libertarian socialists, classical liberals, green libertarians, supporters of Ron Paul, Misesians, and caucus-neutral libertarians. LPAlliance describes itself as neither a political bloc nor an intra-party issue faction, but as a coalition united by the goal of advancing individual liberty and ensuring that diverse perspectives have a voice within the party. Its members retain their respective caucus affiliations and differing views on party strategy while cooperating to strengthen the Libertarian Party and the broader libertarian movement. The organization states that its members represent all 50 states and national regions, with experience ranging from newcomers to lifelong advocates of libertarianism.

== Former caucuses ==
=== Pragmatist Caucus ===
The Pragmatist Caucus was a moderate faction long influential within the Libertarian Party. It was associated with the 2012 and 2016 presidential campaigns of Gary Johnson. It dissolved in 2022. This dissolution was partly due to a controversy caused by the Mises Caucus–controlled Libertarian Party of New Hampshire, which posted offensive messages on social media.

== Ideological factions ==
- Anarcho-capitalists
- Green libertarians
- Libertarian socialists
- Market anarchists
- Minarchists
- Objectivists
- Paleolibertarians
- Classical liberals
- Right-libertarians
- Left-libertarians

== See also ==
- Outline of libertarianism
  - Consequentialist libertarianism
  - Deontological libertarianism
  - Right-libertarianism
  - Left-libertarianism
  - Geolibertarianism
  - Neo-libertarianism
  - Neoclassical liberalism
  - Agorism
- Debates within libertarianism
  - Limited government
  - Optimal tax
  - Libertarian perspectives on political alliances
  - Objectivism and libertarianism
  - Schools of economic thought

Democratic Party

- Factions in the Democratic Party

Republican Party

- Factions in the Republican Party
