= LPRadicals =

United States Libertarian Party caucus

- Libertarian Party Radical Caucus
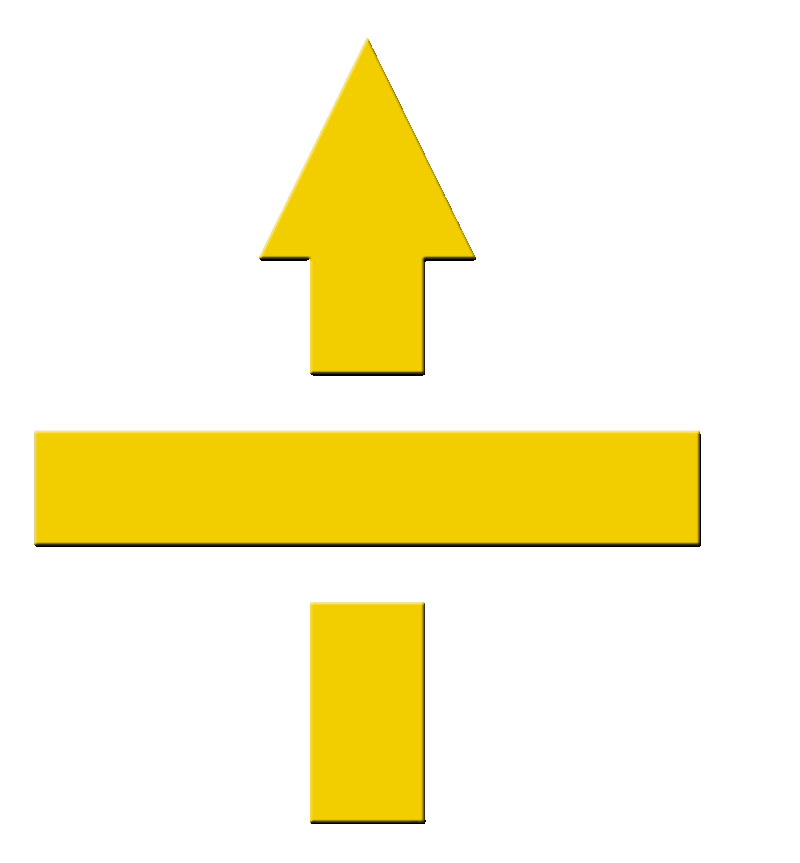
- LPRadicals' "Arrow" logo
- Abbreviation: LPR
- Formation: 2006; 20 years ago
- Founders: Susan Hogarth; Marc Montoni
- Type: Caucus
- Purpose: Make the Libertarian Party adopt Anarcho-Capitalist positions
- Affiliations: Libertarian Party
- Website: www.lpradicalcaucus.org

Libertarian Party Radical Caucus (sometimes abbreviated as "LPRadicals") is a caucus formed in 2006 within the United States Libertarian Party by Susan Hogarth and other party members who opposed removal of much of the material in the party platform during the 2006 national party convention. The caucus generally subscribes to an ideology of anarcho-capitalism. LPRadicals was active at the 2008 and 2010 Libertarian National Conventions. The radical caucus was revived and was extraordinarily active during the 2016 Libertarian National Convention.

== History ==
The LPRadicals remained informally organized from 2006 through 2016 at which time it organized with bylaws and a new website under the Libertarian Party Radical Caucus moniker—the term LPRadicals being used interchangeably. The founding caucus members are Susan Hogarth and Marc Montoni.

== Earlier iterations ==
The first iteration of the LP Radical Caucus was active from 1972 to 1974. The creator of the caucus, Samuel Edward Konkin III, used it in a brief attempt to steer the fledgling movement away from participating in the political process. While some members of the recent iterations of the caucus, including left-wing market anarchists and agorists, identify with the views of Konkin, the present membership requirements include participation in the state and national libertarian parties and emphasize political involvement as a purpose of the Caucus.

The second and best known Radical Caucus was founded by anarcho-capitalist paleolibertarians Justin Raimondo, Eric Garris and Bob Costello in 1979 in order "to unify the party around radical and hardcore libertarian programs." Raimondo led the caucus from inception until he abandoned the Libertarian Party in 1983; he returned to the Republican Party. That Radical Caucus was dissolved in 1984.

== See also ==
- Agorism
- Anarcho-capitalism
- Dallas Accord
- Debates within libertarianism
- Deontological libertarianism
- Factions in the Libertarian Party
- Free-market anarchism
- Individualist anarchism
- Left-wing market anarchism
- Partisanship
- Political radicalism
- Purism
- Rothbard's Button
- Voluntaryism
