= Natural-rights libertarianism =

Political ideology

Natural-rights libertarianism (Note: Also known as deontological liberalism, deontological libertarianism, libertarian moralism, natural rights-based libertarianism, philosophical libertarianism or rights-theorist libertarianism.) is the theory that all individuals possess certain natural or moral rights, mainly a right of individual sovereignty and that therefore acts of initiation of force and fraud are rights-violations and that is sufficient reason to oppose those acts. This is one of the two ethical view points within right-libertarianism, the other being consequentialist libertarianism which only takes into account the consequences of actions and rules when judging them and holds that free markets and strong private property rights have good consequences.

Some deontological libertarian views are based on the non-aggression principle which states that no human being holds the right to initiate force or fraud against the person or property of another human being under any circumstances. This principle is taken as basic, defining all other moral principles, not simply principles of justice. Others are based on self-ownership, and concerned only with principles of justice.

== Deontological libertarian philosophies ==
Natural-rights libertarianism is characteristically deontological in orientation: individual rights (especially self-ownership) and the non-aggression principle function as side-constraints that render the initiation of force or fraud impermissible regardless of consequences. Murray Rothbard gave one of the most systematical presentations in The Ethics of Liberty, deriving a full libertarian legal framework from self-ownership and natural rights in the Lockean tradition (with earlier roots in natural-law thought including Aquinas). Because he regarded the state as an institutionalized aggressor through taxation and its monopoly on coercion, he advocated its abolition (anarcho-capitalism). Hans-Hermann Hoppe has defended private-property norms and the illegitimacy of the state on the basis of argumentation ethics.

Ayn Rand is frequently grouped with this tradition because of her vigorous defense of individual rights and of a government limited to protecting those rights against force and fraud (minarchism). However, Objectivist ethics are not deontological, but rather a form of rational egoism based on the requirements of man's survival and flourishing as a rational being. Rights, in Rand's view, are derived from ethics rather than functioning as primary duties independent of human nature. Some scholars therefore classify Rand, together with thinkers such as Douglas Rasmussen, Douglas Den Uyl, and Roderick Long, with a distinct neo-Aristotelian or eudaemonistic strand of classical liberal thought that is neither strictly deontological nor consequentialist.

== Political parties ==
Deontological libertarianism is the form of libertarianism officially supported by the Libertarian Party in the United States. In order to become a card-carrying member, one must sign an oath opposing the initiation of force to achieve political or social goals.

== Criticisms and responses ==
Some libertarians argue that a relaxation of the non-aggression principle can bring the greatest liberty to the greatest number. Murray Rothbard responded to this criticism by asserting that the means ought never to contradict the ends. Consequentialist libertarians ask "What authoritative force endowed me, and every other human being alive, with the right and responsibility of self-ownership? How does one prove, substantiate, or justify its existence?", at which Rothbard responded by appealing to a process of elimination which concluded in his asserting that self-ownership is the only defensible ethical position.

Philosopher Jonathan Wolff criticizes deontological libertarianism as incoherent, writing that it is incapable of explaining why harm suffered by the losers in economic competition does not violate the principle of self-ownership and that its advocates must "dishonestly smuggle" consequentialist arguments into their reasoning to justify the institution of the free market.

== See also ==
- Austrian School
- Classical liberalism
- Consequentialist libertarianism
- Debates within libertarianism
- Geolibertarianism
- Minarchism
- Natural and legal rights
- Non-aggression principle
- Objectivism and libertarianism
- Outline of libertarianism
- Political ethics
- Self-ownership
- Voluntaryism
