= Outline of libertarianism =

Overview of and topical guide to libertarianism

The following outline is provided as an overview of and topical guide to libertarianism:

Libertarianism – political philosophy that upholds liberty as its principal objective. As a result, libertarians seek to maximize autonomy and freedom of choice, emphasizing political freedom, voluntary association and the primacy of individual judgment.

== Nature of libertarianism ==
Supports

- Economic freedom – the freedom to receive the full value of one's labour, or to produce, trade and consume any goods and services acquired without the use of force, fraud or theft
- Egalitarianism – the idea that all humans are equal in fundamental worth or social status
- Individual responsibility – the idea that a person is responsible for their own actions and their own lives
- Personal development – methods, skills and strategies by which individuals can effectively direct their own activities toward the achievement of objectives and includes goal setting, decision making, focusing, planning, scheduling, task tracking, self-evaluation, self-intervention, self-development and so on
- Self-governance – the idea that a person or group are able to exercise all of the necessary functions of power without intervention from any authority which they cannot themselves alter
- Self-ownership – the concept of property in one's own person, expressed as the moral or natural right of a person to be the exclusive controller of his or her own body and life
- Social responsibility – the idea that a person is responsible for and has an obligation to act in the best interests of their community
- Voluntary association – a group of individuals who enter into an agreement as volunteers to form a body (or organization) to accomplish a purpose

Rejects

- Authoritarianism – a form of social organization characterized by submission to authority
- Coercion – the practice of forcing another party to behave in an involuntary manner (whether through action or inaction) by use of threats or intimidation or some other form of pressure or force
- Imperialism – as defined by the Dictionary of Human Geography, it is "the creation and/or maintenance of an unequal economic, cultural and territorial relationship, usually between states and often in the form of an empire, based on domination and subordination"

Debates

- Abortion
- Anarcho-capitalism and minarchism and libertarian municipalism
- Capital punishment
- Consequentialism vs. deontology
- Employee–employer relationship vs. workers' self-management and worker cooperatives
- Foreign intervention
- Free-market environmentalism
- Free-market and laissez-faire capitalism vs. communism and socialism (including both free-market and laissez-faire socialism and market abolitionist, decentralized-planned economy)
- Immigration
- Intellectual property
- Law
- Objectivism
- Political alliances
- State

== Branches and schools of libertarianism ==
Libertarianism has many overlapping schools of thought, all focused on smaller government and greater individual responsibility. As interpretations of the non-aggression principle vary, some libertarian schools of thought promote the total abolition of government while others promote a smaller government which does not initiate force. Some seek private ownership of all property and natural resources while others promote communal ownership of all natural resources and varying degrees of private property.

- Agorism
- Anarcho-capitalism
- Autarchism
- Bleeding-heart libertarianism
- Christian libertarianism
- Civil libertarianism
- Classical liberalism
- Consequentialist libertarianism
- Crypto-anarchism
- Deontological libertarianism
- Geolibertarianism
- Green libertarianism
- Individualist anarchism
- Laissez-faire
- Liberalism
- Liberism
- Libertarian Christianity
- Libertarian conservatism
- Libertarian paternalism
- Libertarian transhumanism
- Market anarchism
- Market liberalism
- Market socialism
- Minarchism
- Paleolibertarianism
- Panarchism
- Philosophical anarchism
- Propertarianism
- Right-libertarianism
- Social libertarianism
- Voluntaryism

== Origins of libertarianism ==
- Anarchism
  - History of anarchism
  - Anarcho-communism
  - Individualist anarchism
  - Social anarchism
- Anti-Federalism
  - Jeffersonian democracy
- Aristotelianism
  - Thomism
- Free market economics
  - Austrian School of Economics
  - Chicago School of Economics
  - Classical economics
  - French Liberal School
- Levellers
- Liberalism
  - History of liberalism
  - Age of Enlightenment
  - Classical liberalism
- Libertarian communism
- Libertarian socialism
- Metaphysical libertarianism
- Natural law
- Radicalism
  - Classical radicalism
- Transcendentalism

== Libertarian theory and politics ==
- Criticism of libertarianism
- Debates within libertarianism
- Libertarian Party (disambiguation)
- Libertarianism in Hong Kong
- Libertarianism in the United Kingdom
- Libertarianism in the United States
- List of libertarian political parties

=== Libertarian ideals ===
These are concepts which although not necessarily exclusive to libertarianism are significant in historical and modern libertarian circles.

- Autonomy
- Civil liberties
- Civil society
- Co-operative economics
- Counter-economics
- Decentralization
- Economic freedom
- Free market
- Free speech
- Free trade
- Free will
- Freedom of association
- Freedom of contract
- Freedom of movement
- Freedom of religion
- Freedom of the press
- Homestead principle
- Individualism
- Laissez-faire
- Law of equal liberty
- LGBT rights
- Liberty
- Limited government
- Methodological individualism
- Mutual liberty
- Natural rights
- Night watchman state
- Non-aggression
- Non-interventionism
- Non-politics
- Non-violence
- Non-voting
- Participatory economics
- Personal development
- Personalism
- Private defense agency
- Polycentric law
- Property
- Right to keep and bear arms
- Self-governance
- Self-ownership
- Spontaneous order
- Stateless society
- Subjective theory of value
- Subsidiarity
- Tax resistance
- Title-transfer theory of contract
- Voluntary association
- Voluntary society

== Individuals who have influenced libertarianism ==
=== Anarchists ===
- Émile Armand (1872–1962) – influential individualist anarchist
- Mikhail Bakunin (1814–1876) – theorist of collectivist anarchism who influenced the development of left-libertarianism
- William Godwin (1756–1836) – the first modern proponent of anarchism, whose political views are outlined in his book Political Justice
- Karl Hess (1923–1993) – libertarian socialist and tax resistor
- Thomas Hodgskin (1787–1869) – author of works on anti-capitalism, individualist anarchism and libertarian socialism
- Pierre-Joseph Proudhon (1809–1865) – the first self-described anarchist and founder of mutualism
- Lysander Spooner (1808–1887) – notable individualist anarchist and founder of the American Letter Mail Company
- Max Stirner (1806–1856) – founder of egoist anarchism
- Benjamin Tucker (1854–1939) – a leading theorist of individualist anarchism in the 19th century
- Josiah Warren (1798–1874) – the first known American anarchist and author of the anarchist periodical The Peaceful Revolutionist

=== Economists ===
- Frédéric Bastiat (1801–1850) – 19th century creator of the concept of opportunity cost
- Peter Bauer (1915–2002) – wrote about developmental economics
- Eugen von Böhm-Bawerk (1851–1914) – contributor to the Austrian School
- Richard Cantillon (c. 1680–1734) – wrote about prices, value, and markets
- Charles Dunoyer (1786–1862) – French economist and political scholar
- David D. Friedman (b. 1945) – American economist
- Robin Hahnel (b. 1946) – modern participatory economics scholar and libertarian socialist
- Floyd Harper (1905–1973) – founded the Institute for Humane Studies
- Hans-Hermann Hoppe (b. 1949) – developed extensive work on argumentation ethics
- Israel M. Kirzner (b. 1930) – British economist
- Frank H. Knight (1855–1972) – American professor
- Carl Menger (1840–1921) – founder of Austrian School economics
- John Stuart Mill (1806–1873) – British philosopher and political economist, wrote On Liberty
- Ludwig von Mises (1881–1972) – philosopher, Austrian School economist, sociologist and classical liberal
- Gustave de Molinari (1819–1912) – French commentator on political economy
- Franz Oppenheimer (1864–1943) – German sociologist and economist
- Vincent Ostrom (1919–2012) – American educator and political economist
- David Ricardo (1772–1823) – British classical economist
- Murray Rothbard (1926–1995) – founder of anarcho-capitalism and a leading Austrian School economist
- Jean-Baptiste Say (1767–1832) – French political economist
- Joseph Schumpeter (1883–1950) – Moravian-born Austrian economist
- Nassau William Senior (1790–1864) – British economist
- Julian Simon (1932–1998) – American economist
- Adam Smith (1723–1790) – British political economist and philosopher
- Thomas Sowell (b. 1930) – American economist and social theorist
- William Graham Sumner (1840–1910) – American economist and sociologist
- Antoine Destutt de Tracy (1754–1836) – French economist and political theorist
- Gordon Tullock (1922–2014) – American economist and sociologist
- Anne Robert Jacques Turgot (1727–1781) – French economist and statesman
- Knut Wicksell (1851–1926) – Swedish economist
- Nobel Laureates
  - Gary Becker (1930–2014) – who wrote about human behavior
  - James M. Buchanan (1919–2013) – worked on public choice theory
  - Ronald H. Coase (1910–2013) – studied transaction costs
  - Milton Friedman (1912–2006) – monetarist economist, supported economic deregulation and privatization
  - Friedrich Hayek (1899–1992) – Austrian School economist, notable for his political work The Road to Serfdom
  - Elinor Ostrom (1933–2012) – common pool resource theorist and environmentalist
  - George J. Stigler (1911–1991) – Chicago School economist

=== Legal and political figures ===
- John Adams (1735–1826) – drafted the American Declaration of Independence
- Étienne de La Boétie (1530–1563) – French judge and writer, early advocate of civil disobedience and nonviolent resistance
- Edmund Burke (1792–1797) – influential liberal conservative
- Ed Clark (1930–2025) – lawyer and US Libertarian Party politician
- Richard Cobden (1804–1865) – Anti-Corn Law League figure (opposing tariffs)
- Edward Coke (1552–1634) – British MP and legal scholar
- Charles Comte (1782–1837) – French political and legal scholar
- Marquis de Condorcet (1743–1794) – author and liberal reformer during the French Revolution
- Benjamin Constant (1767–1830) – figure during the French Revolution who argued for constitutional limits on power
- Albert Venn Dicey (1835–1922) – scholar of British constitutional law
- Denis Diderot (1713–1784) – French legal scholar
- Richard A. Epstein (b. 1943) – American law professor and legal theorist
- Adam Ferguson (1723–1816) – influenced the Scottish Enlightenment
- William Ewart Gladstone (1809–1898) – British political figure
- Barry Goldwater (1909–1998) – US Senator and presidential candidate
- Auberon Herbert (1836–1906) – British writer, MP, and founder of the doctrine of Voluntaryism
- John Hospers (1918–2011) – American philosopher and Libertarian Party political candidate
- Thomas Jefferson (1743–1826) – American president
- Roger Lea MacBride (1929–1995) – American writer and US Libertarian Party presidential nominee
- James Madison (1750–1836) – American president
- Henry Sumner Maine (1822–1888) – British legal scholar
- George Mason (1725–1792) – American Revolutionary War figure
- Tonie Nathan (1923–2014) – American media commentator and Libertarian Party vice-presidential election candidate
- Thomas Paine (1737–1809) – American Revolutionary War figure
- Ron Paul (b. 1935) – American politician and presidential candidate (1988, 2008 and 2012)
- Richard Posner (b. 1939) – American judge and legal theorist
- Roscoe Pound (1870–1964) – American legal theorist
- John Rawls (1921–2002) – American legal theorist
- Third Earl of Shaftesbury (1671–1713) – English politician, philosopher, and writer
- Algernon Sidney (1623–1683) – British statesman and philosopher
- Robert A. Taft (1889–1953) – US Senator and conservative politician
- George Washington (1732–1799) – American president
- William Wilberforce (1759–1833) – British politician, social activist, and philanthropist

=== Objectivists ===
- Nathaniel Branden (1930–2014) – influenced Ayn Rand
- Leonard Peikoff (b. 1933) – founder of the Ayn Rand Institute and Rand's designated intellectual heir
- Ayn Rand (1905–1982) – the creator of the philosophy of Objectivism

=== Others ===
- Thomas Aquinas (c. 1225–1274) – theologian who wrote about individual autonomy
- Aristotle (382–322 BCE) – Greek philosopher and polymath whose philosophy stressed personal virtue
- Jeremy Bentham (1748–1832) – English 'father of utilitarianism'
- Murray Bookchin (1921–2006) – founder of libertarian municipalism and social ecology theorist
- John Bright (1811–1889) – British radical who promoted free trade
- John Brown (1800–1859) – abolitionist leader
- Henry Thomas Buckle (1821–1862) – historian who defended laissez-faire trade
- Jean-Jacques Burlamaqui (1694–1748) – wrote about natural law
- Roy Childs (1949–1992) – essayist and critic
- Frank Chodorov (1887–1966) – member of the American Old Right
- Noam Chomsky (b. 1928) – linguist and social critic
- Cicero (106–43 BCE) – Roman jurist and classical humanist
- Frederick Douglass (1818–1895) – American abolitionist
- Ralph Waldo Emerson (1803–1882) – American founder of Transcendentalism
- Antony Fisher (1915–1988) – British philanthropist and founder of the Atlas Network
- Michel Foucault (1926–1984) – French social theorist
- William Lloyd Garrison (1805–1879) – American abolitionist
- Henry Hazlitt (1894–1993) – American journalist and writer
- Robert Heinlein (1907–1988) – science fiction writer
- Thomas Hobbes (1588–1676) – political theorist who wrote Leviathan
- Wilhelm von Humboldt (1767–1835) – German political theorist who wrote The Limits of State Action
- David Hume (1711–1776) – Scottish Enlightenment author of the Treatise of Human Nature
- Francis Hutcheson (1694–1746) – figure in the Scottish Enlightenment
- Jane Jacobs (1916–2006) – Canadian writer on urban planning
- Bertrand de Jouvenel (1903–1987) – French writer on political and social thought
- Immanuel Kant (1724–1804) – German Enlightenment philosopher
- Rose Wilder Lane (1886–1968) – American writer
- Lao Tzu (c. 600 BCE) – argued for limited government
- Bartolomé de las Casas (1474–1566) – Spanish historian
- Robert LeFevre (1911–1986) – American educator, founder of Rampart College
- William Leggett (1801–1839) – American journalist
- John Locke (1632–1704) – philosopher, generally regarded as the 'father of liberalism'
- Lord Acton (1834–1902) – historian
- Thomas Babington Macaulay (1800–1859) – British classical liberal
- Bernard Mandeville (1670–1733) – Dutch-born, London based physician
- H. L. Mencken (1880–1956) – American writer
- Frank S. Meyer (1909–1972) – American writer and founder of National Review
- John Milton (1608–1674) – British poet and political commentator
- Michel de Montaigne (1533–1592) – writer during the French Renaissance
- Montesquieu (1689–1755) – French social commentator and political thinker
- Charles Murray (b. 1943) – American political scientist
- Friedrich Nietzsche (1844–1900) – German political writer
- Albert Jay Nock (1870–1945) – American political writer
- Robert Nozick (1938–2002) – philosopher and author of Anarchy, State, and Utopia
- José Ortega y Gasset (1883–1955) – Spanish philosopher and essayist
- George Orwell (1903–1950) – British writer and social analyst
- Isabel Paterson (1886–1961) – American writer
- Karl Popper (1902–1994) – Vienna-born British social theorist
- Richard Price (1723–1791) – British moral and political theorist
- Leonard E. Read (1898–1983) – American writer and author of I, Pencil
- Jean-Jacques Rousseau (1712–1778) – French Enlightenment philosopher
- Herbert Spencer (1820–1903) – biologist, sociologist and philosopher
- Thomas Szasz (1920–2012) – Hungarian-born American physician and writer
- Henry David Thoreau (1817–1862) – philosopher of American transcendentalism and anarcho-pacifism
- Alexis de Tocqueville (1805–1859) – French-born political theorist
- Voltaire (1694–1778) – French philosopher, historian, and writer
- Robert Anton Wilson (1932–2007) – author of The Illuminatus! Trilogy
- Mary Wollstonecraft (1759–1797) – British writer

== See also ==
- Anarcho-syndicalism
- Anti-state
- Anti-war
- Fusionism
- Libertarian Democrat
- Libertarian Republican
- List of libertarian organizations

Categories

- Category:Libertarianism by country
- Category:Libertarianism by form
- Category:Libertarians by nationality
