= Philosophy: Who Needs It =

1982 book by Ayn Rand

- Cover of the first edition
- Editor: Leonard Peikoff
- Author: Ayn Rand
- Language: English
- Series: Ayn Rand Library
- Subject: Philosophy
- Publisher: Bobbs-Merrill
- Publication date: 1982
- Publication place: United States
- Media type: Print (Hardcover and Paperback)
- Pages: 276 (hardcover); 274 (paperback); 228 (Centennial edition)
- ISBN: 0-672-52725-1 (hardcover); 0-451-13893-7 (Centennial edition)
- OCLC: 8346296

Philosophy: Who Needs It is a collection of essays by the philosopher Ayn Rand, published posthumously in 1982. It was the last book on which Rand worked during her lifetime.

== Summary ==
The title essay is an address given to the graduating class of the United States Military Academy on March 6, 1974, in which Rand argues that philosophy plays a central role in all human activities, that every action or thought has certain assumptions, and that humans need to examine those assumptions to live a full, meaningful life. Another speech included is "Faith and Force: The Destroyers of the Modern World", which was delivered at college appearances in 1960.

The remaining chapters are reprints of articles Rand published in the 1970s, primarily in her periodical The Ayn Rand Letter. These reprints include "Kant Versus Sullivan", which is about how William Gibson's play The Miracle Worker illustrates the importance of language and conceptual learning, "An Open Letter to Boris Spassky", addressed to Soviet chess grandmaster Boris Spassky, and "The Stimulus and the Response", a critique of the book Beyond Freedom and Dignity by psychologist B. F. Skinner.

== Publication history ==
Rand had begun work on the collection prior to her death, but the final editing was handled by her heir, Leonard Peikoff. Most of the essays originally appeared in The Ayn Rand Letter. Bobbs-Merrill published the hardcover edition in September 1982, followed by a trade paperback edition in September 1984. New American Library published it as a mass market paperback in November 1984. The New American Library edition was promoted as volume one of the "Ayn Rand Library" series edited by Peikoff.

== Reception ==
At the time of its release, the book received mostly negative reviews. Writing in the libertarian magazine Reason, the philosopher Douglas Den Uyl gives the book a "mixed assessment", saying that several of the essays are worth reading, but the book as a whole "is not particularly original or substantive" in comparison to her previous works. Den Uyl reaches a similar conclusion in collaboration with Douglas B. Rasmussen, writing in The Philosophic Thought of Ayn Rand that the book "does not contain the kind of significant philosophizing found in her earlier works".

Later scholars have also criticized the book, as well as some of its essays. The historian James Baker writes that the volume "lacks the strength to launch any significant project". The philosopher Fred Seddon says that Rand's explanation of the ethical views of Immanuel Kant in the essay "Causality versus Duty" is a straw man. George H. Smith describes "Causality versus Duty" as "an important essay" describing Rand's views on morality, but criticizes her for another essay in which she criticized the views expressed by philosopher John Rawls in his book A Theory of Justice without having read the book.

== See also ==
- Objectivism
