= Debates within libertarianism =

Issues of the political philosophy

Libertarianism is variously defined by sources, as there is no general consensus among scholars on its definition or on how one should use the term as a historical category. Scholars generally agree that libertarianism refers to a group of political philosophies that emphasize freedom, individual liberty, and voluntary association. Libertarians generally advocate a society with little or no government power.

The Stanford Encyclopedia of Philosophy defines libertarianism as the moral view that agents initially fully own themselves and have certain moral powers to acquire property rights in external things. Left-libertarian historian George Woodcock defines libertarianism as the philosophy that fundamentally doubts authority and advocates transforming society by reform or revolution. Libertarian philosopher Roderick T. Long defines libertarianism as "any political position that advocates a radical redistribution of power from the coercive state to voluntary associations of free individuals", whether "voluntary association" takes the form of the free market or of communal co-operatives. According to the American Libertarian Party, libertarianism is the advocacy of a government that is funded voluntarily and limited to protecting individuals from coercion and violence.

There are many philosophical disagreements among proponents of libertarianism concerning questions of ideology, values, and strategy. For instance, left-libertarians were the ones to coin the term as a synonym for anarchism. Outside of the United States, libertarianism is still synonymous with anarchism and socialism (social anarchism and libertarian socialism). Right-libertarianism, known in the United States simply as libertarianism, was coined in May 1955 by writer Dean Russell as a synonym for classical liberalism, after American liberals embraced progressivism and economic interventionism in the early 20th century following the Great Depression and with the New Deal. As a result, the term was co-opted in the mid-20th century to advocate instead for laissez-faire capitalism and strong private property rights in land, infrastructure, and natural resources. The main debate between the two forms of libertarianism therefore concerns the legitimacy of private property and its meaning. Most other debates remain within right-libertarianism, as abortion, capital punishment, foreign affairs, LGBT rights, and immigration are non-issues for left-libertarians, whereas within right-libertarianism they are debated due to their divide between cultural liberal and cultural conservative right-libertarians.

== Philosophy ==
Libertarian philosophies are generally divided by three principal questions:

- ethical theory: whether actions are determined to be moral consequentially or in terms of natural rights (or deontologically);
- the legitimacy of private property
- the legitimacy of the state.

Libertarian philosophy can therefore be broadly divided into eight groups based on these distinctions.

=== Abortion ===
An estimated 60–70% of American libertarians believe women are entitled to abortion rights, although many who identify as pro-choice do maintain that abortion becomes homicidal at some stage during pregnancy and therefore should not remain legal beyond that point.

To the contrary, the Libertarian Party states that government should have no role in restricting abortion, implying opposition to any and all proposed federal or state legislation which might prohibit any method of abortion at any given stage of gestation. Groups like the Association of Libertarian Feminists and Pro-Choice Libertarians support keeping government out of the issue entirely.

On the other hand, Libertarians for Life argues that human zygotes, embryos, and fetuses possess the same natural human rights and deserve the same protections as neonates, calling for outlawing abortion as an aggressive act against a rights-bearing unborn child. Former Texas Congressman Ron Paul, a figurehead of American libertarianism, is an anti-abortion physician, as is his son, Kentucky Senator Rand Paul. Nonetheless, most American libertarians, whether pro-choice or pro-life, agree the federal government should play no role in prohibiting, protecting, or facilitating abortion and oppose the Supreme Court conclusion in Roe v. Wade that abortion is a fundamental right if performed during the first trimester of pregnancy by virtue of an implicit constitutional right to privacy.

In addition, there are the property rights perspectives evictionism and departurism which allow that the unwanted fetus is a trespasser on the mother's property (her womb), but hold that this designation does not mean that the child may therefore be directly killed. The former view maintains that the trespasser may only be killed indirectly as a result of eviction, while the latter view upholds only non-lethal eviction during normal pregnancies.

=== Capital punishment ===
Right-libertarians are divided on capital punishment, also known as the death penalty. Those opposing it generally see it as an excessive abuse of state power, that is, by its very nature irreversible, with American libertarians possibly seeing it also in conflict with the Bill of Rights ban on "cruel and unusual punishment". Some libertarians who believe capital punishment can be just under certain circumstances may oppose execution based on practical considerations. Those who support the death penalty do so on self-defense or retributive justice grounds.

=== Ethics ===
There are broadly two types of libertarianism, based on ethical doctrines: consequentialist libertarianism and natural-rights libertarianism, or deontological libertarianism. Deontological libertarians hold that natural rights exist and from there argue that the initiation of force and fraud should never occur. Natural-rights libertarianism may include both right-libertarianism and left-libertarianism. Consequentialist libertarians argue that a free market and strong private property rights bring about beneficial consequences, such as wealth creation or efficiency, rather than subscribing to a theory of rights or justice. There are hybrid forms of libertarianism that combine deontological and consequentialist reasoning.

Contractarian libertarianism holds that any legitimate authority of government derives not from the consent of the governed, but rather from contract or mutual agreement, although this can be seen as reducible to consequentialism or deontologism depending on what grounds contracts are justified. Some libertarian socialists reject deontological and consequential approaches and use historical materialism to justify their political beliefs.

=== Foreign affairs ===
Libertarians are generally against any military intervention in other countries. Other libertarians are also opposed to strategic alliances with foreign countries. According to its 2016 platform, the American Libertarian Party is against any foreign aid to other countries and the only wars that they support are in situations of self-defense. Such libertarians generally try to explain that they are not isolationists, but non-interventionists.

=== Immigration ===
Libertarians generally support freedom of movement and open borders. However, some right-libertarians, particularly Hoppean anarcho-capitalists who propose the full privatization of land and natural resources, contend that a policy of open borders amounts to legalized trespassing.

=== Inheritance ===
Libertarians disagree over what to do in the absence of a will or contract in the event of death and over posthumous property rights. In the event of a contract, the contract is enforced according to the property owner's wishes. Typically, right-libertarians believe that any intestate property should go to the living relatives of the deceased and that none of the property should go to the government. Others say that if no will has been made, the property immediately enters the state of nature from which anyone (save the state) may homestead it.

=== Intellectual property ===
Libertarians hold a variety of views on intellectual property (IP) and patents. Some libertarian natural rights theorists justify property rights in ideas and other intangibles just as they do property rights in physical goods, saying whoever made it owns it. Other libertarian natural rights theorists such as Stephan Kinsella have held that only physical material can be owned and that ownership of IP amount to an illegitimate claim of ownership over that which enters another's mind that cannot be removed or controlled without violation of the non-aggression axiom. Pro-IP libertarians of the utilitarian tradition say that IP maximizes innovation while anti-IP libertarians of the selfsame persuasion say that it causes shortages of innovation. This latter view holds that IP is a euphemism for intellectual protectionism and should be abolished altogether.

=== Original appropriation ===
There are differences of opinion regarding original appropriation, such as the labor theory of property and the first possession theory of property.

=== Land ownership ===
Following political economist and social reformer Henry George's philosophy of classical liberalism known as Georgism and the single-tax movement of activists who supported it (see also the single tax), some free-market centrists and non-socialist left-libertarians known as geolibertarians argue that because land is not the product of human labor and it is inelastic in supply and essential for life and wealth creation, the market rental value of land should properly be considered commons. They interpret the Lockean proviso and the law of equal liberty to mean that exclusive land ownership beyond one's equal share of aggregate land value necessarily restricts the freedom of others to access natural space and resources. In order to promote freedom and minimize waste, they argue that absent improvements individuals should surrender the rental value of the land to which they hold legal title to the community as a subscription fee for the privilege to exclude others from the site. Since geolibertarians wish to limit the influence of government, they would have this revenue fund a universal basic income or citizen's dividend which would also function as a social safety net to replace the existing welfare system. Based on David Ricardo's law of rent, they further argue that this tax shift would serve to boost wages.

=== LGBT rights ===
In general, libertarians oppose laws that limit the sexual freedom of adults.

=== Limited government ===
Libertarians differ on whether any government at all is desirable. Some favor the existence of governments and see them as civilly necessary while others favor stateless societies and view the state as being undesirable, unnecessary and harmful, if not intrinsically evil.

Supporters of limited libertarian government or a night watchman state argue that placing all defense and courts under private control, regulated only by market demand, is an inherent miscarriage of justice because justice would be bought and sold as a commodity, thereby conflating authentic impartial justice with economic power. Market anarchists counter that having defense and courts controlled by the state is both immoral and an inefficient means of achieving both justice and security. Libertarian socialists hold that liberty is incompatible with state action based on a class struggle analysis of the state.

=== Mandatory vaccination ===
Right-libertarians are divided over mandatory vaccination. Some oppose mandatory vaccination on the grounds of it violating a person's individual liberty and being skeptical of government authority. Others support mandatory vaccination, arguing that libertarian principles prohibit reckless behaviour that puts other people at risk. According to Voice of America, "opposition to vaccination is often couched in libertarian terms: It's my body, my choice."

=== Natural resources ===
Right-libertarians such as free-market environmentalists and Objectivists believe that environmental damage is more often than not a result of state ownership and mismanagement of natural resources, for example by the military-industrial complex. Other right-libertarians such as anarcho-capitalists contend that private ownership of all natural resources will result in a better environment as a private owner of property will have more incentive to ensure the longer term value of the property. Other libertarians such as geolibertarians or left-libertarians believe the Earth cannot legitimately be held in allodium, that usufructuary title with periodic land value capture and redistribution avoids both the tragedy of the commons and the tragedy of the anticommons while respecting equal rights to natural resources.

=== Propertarianism ===
Right-libertarian philosophies are usually strong propertarians that define liberty as non-aggression, or the state in which no person or group aggresses against any other person or group, where aggression is defined as the violation of private property. This philosophy implicitly recognizes private property as the sole source of legitimate authority. Propertarian libertarians hold that an order of private property is the only one that is both ethical and leads to the best possible outcomes. They generally support the free market and are not opposed to any concentration of power (monopolies), provided it is brought about through non-coercive means. However, there is also a minority of soft propertarian libertarian philosophies. According to this moderately left-libertarian perspective, a society based on individual liberty and equal access to natural opportunities can be achieved through proportionate compensation to others by those who claim private ownership over a greater-than-equal share of the aggregate value of natural resources, absent any improvements.

Non-propertarian libertarian philosophies hold that liberty is the absence of hierarchy and demands the leveling of systemically coercive and exploitative power structures. On this libertarian socialist view, a society based on freedom and equality can be achieved through abolishing authoritarian institutions that control certain means of production and subordinate the majority to an owning class or political and economic elite. Implicitly, it rejects any authority of private property and holds that it is not legitimate for someone to claim private ownership of any production resources to the detriment of others. Libertarian socialism is a group of political philosophies that promote a non-hierarchical, non-bureaucratic, stateless society without private property in the means of production. The term libertarian socialism is also used to differentiate this philosophy from state socialism. Libertarian socialists generally place their hopes in decentralized means of direct democracy such as libertarian municipalism, citizens' assemblies, trade unions and workers' councils.

=== Race and sex ===
American libertarians, especially right-libertarians, are against laws that favor or harm any race or either sex. These include Jim Crow laws, state segregation, interracial marriage bans and laws that discriminate on the basis of sex. Likewise, they oppose state-enforced affirmative action, hate crime laws and anti-discrimination laws. They would not use the state to prevent voluntary affirmative action or voluntary discrimination. Most of these libertarians believe that the drive for profit in the marketplace will diminish or eliminate the effects of racism, which they tend to consider to be inherently collectivist. This causes a degree of dissonance among libertarians in federal systems such as in the United States, where there is debate among libertarians about whether the federal government has the right to coerce states to change their democratically created laws.

=== Taxation ===
Some deontological libertarians believe that consistent adherence to libertarian doctrines such as the non-aggression principle demands unqualified moral opposition to any form of taxation, a sentiment encapsulated in the phrase "Taxation is theft!". They would fund all services through gratuitous contributions, private law and defense user fees as well as lotteries.

Other libertarians support low taxes of various kinds, arguing that a society with no taxation would have difficulty providing public goods such as crime prevention and a consistent, unified legal system to punish rights violators. Commonly advocated reforms include a flat personal income tax, a consumption tax such as the FairTax, or a land value tax system.

While the former proposals are normally considered necessary evils or strategic compromises, geolibertarians argue that a single tax on the rental value of land, typically in conjunction with Pigovian pollution taxes and severance taxes to internalize negative externalities and curb natural resource depletion, is not only non-distortionary and politically sustainable, but also more ethically attractive than zero taxation and even required for justice in property rights.

=== Voluntary slavery ===
Libertarians generally believe that voluntary slavery is a contradiction in terms. However, certain right-libertarians dispute the Lockean claim that some rights are inalienable and maintain that even permanent voluntary slavery is possible and contractually binding. Famous libertarian Murray Rothbard argued that libertarians seeing children as property of the parents left the platform open to sales of children as slaves, when parents needed finances, and that people entering into voluntary slavery would most likely be when there was no alternative available to pay debts, but this was not coercive as under the libertarian platform only the government could engage in coercion. Detractors maintain that there is no such thing as a morally-binding "slavery contract".

=== Involuntary psychiatry ===
Involuntary commitment, outpatient commitment, mental-health conservatorships, and involuntary treatment, although in opposition to self-ownership and in some countries the main way of confinement and social control, are issues rarely discussed by libertarians.

Thomas Szasz argued that involuntary psychiatry is incompatible with libertarianism and that Bertrand Russell, Robert Nozick, John Stuart Mill, Ayn Rand, the American Civil Liberties Union, and Friedrich von Hayek among others "went wrong" by their omission, ambiguity, or direct support.

Most criticism comes from fields such as sociology (such as by Michel Foucault), psychiatry (such by as Franco Basaglia), and human rights NGOs. Philosophy and public-policy positioning by libertarians are often uncertain.

=== Fraud ===
There has been a long-standing debate about how to deal with the problem of fraud in a libertarian society.

For example, Rothbard argued that conveying or spreading false information is not a problem, but fraud can be prohibited as a form of theft. And Kinsella also expressed similar opinions. However, Mark D. Friedman argues that this argument is dubious, because in the case of fraud, 'he has been duped, he nevertheless elects to entrust his property'.

James W. Child questioned whether libertarians could maintain their standards of fraud. Since then, many scholars have followed him and raised similar questions.

One can also argue that whether the sale is a legal offense depends upon whether Ethan knew the truth and intentionally exaggerated the qualities of his product: did he intentionally lie, or did he make an honest mistake? Does it matter? Rothbard would probably say no. Consider again his remark: "Surely legality or illegality should depend not on the motivation of the actor, but on the objective nature of the act. If an action is objectively non-invasive, then it should be legal regardless of the benevolent or malicious intentions of the actor" (Rothbard 1982, p. 121).

— Pavel Slutskiy (2016), Fraudulent advertising, pp.112-113

The key question is whether any kind of fraud prevention or punishment can be derived directly from the basic principles of libertarianism, provided no additional constraints are imposed:

In the case of deceit, it is far from clear that the underlying action independent of intention – the conveyance of a falsehood – is something that persons have libertarian rights against. Neither self ownership nor property ownership imply rights to not receive false information. One exception occurs in special cases where a party has explicitly contracted to receive information. (...) Though promising, this solution cannot succeed. It is based on the idea that information is a good like any other that can be transferred between persons. However, if this is so, then exchanges of information are also subject to deceitfully obtained consent. Just as A might lie about the car's condition in order to obtain B's consent to a transaction she would not otherwise have consented to, A might lie about the properties of the information he is providing in the no-fraud clause that is intended to solve the fraud problem. Of course B could then try to contract against A's selling him a fraudulent contract, but by now it should be clear that this strategy is subject to a vicious regress.

— Benjamin Ferguson, Can libertarians get away with fraud?

== Strategy ==
=== Non-voting ===
Most libertarians interpret voting even for a suboptimal candidate or policy as an act of political self-defense aimed at minimizing rights violations.

However, some libertarians (such as agorists) employ non-voting as a political tactic; following 19th-century individualist anarchists like Lysander Spooner and Benjamin Tucker, they consider voting an immoral concession to state legitimacy. Others who champion the concept of rational ignorance view voting as an impractical and irrational behavior on a cost-benefit analysis. Other more moderate libertarians abstain from voting from a perception that the current system is broken or out of touch.

=== Political alliances ===
Until fairly recently, American libertarians have allied politically with modern conservatives over economic issues and gun laws while they are more prone to ally with liberals on other civil liberties issues and non-interventionism. As conservatives increasingly favor protectionism over free and open trade, and progressives increasingly favor restrictions on speech deemed offensive or disinformative, the popular characterization of libertarian policy as economically conservative and socially liberal has been rendered less meaningful. Libertarians may choose to vote for candidates of other parties depending on the individual and the issues they promote. Paleolibertarians have a long-standing affinity with paleoconservatives in opposing United States interventions and promoting decentralization and cultural conservatism.

=== Revolution ===
Libertarians generally agree on the desirability of rapid and fundamental changes in power dynamics and institutional structures, but may disagree on the means by which such changes might be achieved. Some right-libertarians strongly oppose violent revolution as unethical and counterproductive. However, a growing number of right-libertarians, inspired by the Founding Fathers of the United States, believe in revolution as a justified means to counter what they see as a corrupt government. Many left-libertarians, especially anarchists and socialists, regard the state to be at the definitional center of structural violence, directly or indirectly preventing people from meeting their basic needs, calling for violence as self-defense and seeing violent revolution as necessary in the abolition of capitalist society, mainly to counteract the violence inherent in both capitalism and government. Some on the left have also come to believe that violence, especially self-defense, is justified as a way to inspire further social upheaval which could lead to a social revolution); others argue in favor of a non-violent revolution through a process of dual power, and pacifists see the concept of the general strike as the great revolutionary weapon. Market anarchists of a left-wing persuasion, such as agorists, also advocate various forms of nonviolent resistance, tax resistance or evasion, public acts of civic disloyalty and disobedience, counter-economics, and subversive black market.

== See also ==
- Anarcho-capitalism and minarchism
- Factions in the Libertarian Party (United States)
- Issues in anarchism
- Left-libertarianism
- Outline of libertarianism
- Philosophy of law
- Political ethics
- Political philosophy
- Right-libertarianism
