= Voluntaryism =

Philosophy supporting all forms of human association being voluntary

Voluntaryism (UK: /ˈvɒləntəriɪzəm/, US: /-tɛr-/; sometimes voluntarism /ˈvɒləntərɪzəm/) is used to describe the philosophy of Auberon Herbert, and later that of the authors and supporters of The Voluntaryist magazine, which supports a voluntary-funded state (i.e. "the Voluntary State"), meaning a lack of coercion and force in matters such as taxation.

This is conventionally completed through a strict adherence to pacifism, civil rights, and either arbitration or some other mutually-agreed-upon court system between individuals.

As a term, voluntaryism was coined in this usage by Auberon Herbert in the 19th century and gained renewed use since the late 20th century, especially within libertarianism in the United States. Voluntaryist principal beliefs stem from the idea of natural rights, equality, non-coercion, and non-aggression. Despite his association with 20th century anarcho-capitalism, Herbert rejected the idea of anarchy, hence its support for the state to enforce the law.

== History ==
=== Movements identifying as voluntaryist ===
==== 17th century ====
Precursors to the voluntaryist movement had a long tradition in the English-speaking world, at least as far back as the Leveller movement of mid-seventeenth century England. The Leveller spokesmen John Lilburne and Richard Overton who "clashed with the Presbyterian puritans, who wanted to preserve a state-church with coercive powers and to deny liberty of worship to the puritan sects".

The Levellers were nonconformist in religion and advocated for the separation of church and state. The church to their way of thinking was a voluntary associating of equals, and furnished a theoretical and practical model for the civil state. If it was proper for their church congregations to be based on consent, then it was proper to apply the same principle of consent to its secular counterpart. For example, the Leveller 'Large' Petition of 1647 contained a proposal "that tythes and all other inforced maintenances, may be for ever abolished, and nothing in place thereof imposed, but that all Ministers may be paid only by those who voluntarily choose them, and contract with them for their labours." The Levellers also held to the idea of self-proprietorship.

==== 19th century ====
The educational voluntaryists wanted free trade in education, just as they supported free trade in corn or cotton. They believed that "government would employ education for its own ends" (teaching habits of obedience and indoctrination), and that government-controlled schools would ultimately teach children to rely on the State for all things. Baines, for example, noted that "[w]e cannot violate the principles of liberty in regard to education without furnishing at once a precedent and inducement to violate them in regard to other matters". Baines conceded that the then current system of education (both private and charitable) had deficiencies, but he argued that freedom should not be abridged on that account. In asking whether freedom of the press should be compromised because we have bad newspapers, Baines replied that "I maintain that Liberty is the chief cause of excellence; but it would cease to be Liberty if you proscribed everything inferior". The Congregational Board of Education and the Baptist Voluntary Education Society are usually given pride of place among the Voluntaryists.

In southern Africa, voluntaryism in religious matters was an important part of the liberal "Responsible Government" movement of the mid-19th century, along with support for multi-racial democracy and an opposition to British imperial control. The movement was driven by powerful local leaders such as Saul Solomon and John Molteno. When it briefly gained power, it disestablished the state-supported churches in 1875.

==== In the United States ====
There were at least two well-known Americans who espoused voluntaryist causes during the mid-19th century. Henry David Thoreau's first brush with the law in his home state of Massachusetts came in 1838, when he turned twenty-one. The state demanded that he pay the one dollar ministerial tax in support of a clergyman, "whose preaching my father attended but never I myself". When Thoreau refused to pay the tax, it was probably paid by one of his aunts. In order to avoid the ministerial tax in the future, Thoreau had to sign an affidavit attesting he was not a member of the church.

Thoreau's overnight imprisonment for his failure to pay another municipal tax, the poll tax, to the town of Concord was recorded in his essay "Resistance to Civil Government", first published in 1849. It is often referred to as "On the Duty of Civil Disobedience" because in it he concluded that government was dependent on the cooperation of its citizens. While he was not a thoroughly consistent voluntaryist, he did write that he wished never to "rely on the protection of the state" and that he refused to tender it his allegiance so long as it supported slavery. He distinguished himself from "those who call[ed] themselves no-government men", writing that "I ask for, not at once no government, but at once a better government". This has been interpreted as a gradualist, rather than minarchist, stance, given that he also opened his essay by stating his belief that "government is best which governs not at all", a point that all voluntaryists heartily embrace.

Another one was Charles Lane. He was friendly with Amos Bronson Alcott, Ralph Waldo Emerson and Thoreau. Between January and June 1843, a series of nine letters he penned were published in such abolitionist's papers as The Liberator and The Herald of Freedom. The title under which they were published was "A Voluntary Political Government" in which Lane described the state in terms of institutionalized violence and referred to its "club law, its mere brigand right of a strong arm, [supported] by guns and bayonets". He saw the coercive state on par with "forced" Christianity, arguing: "Everyone can see that the church is wrong when it comes to men with the [B]ible in one hand, and the sword in the other. Is it not equally diabolical for the state to do so?" Lane believed that governmental rule was only tolerated by public opinion because the fact was not yet recognized that all the true purposes of the state could be carried out on the voluntary principle, just as churches could be sustained voluntarily. Reliance on the voluntary principle could only come about through "kind, orderly, and moral means" that were consistent with the totally voluntary society he was advocating, adding: "Let us have a voluntary State as well as a voluntary Church, and we may possibly then have some claim to the appeallation of free men".

=== Modern-era voluntaryists ===
Although use of the label voluntaryist waned after the death of Auberon Herbert in 1906, its use was renewed in 1982, when George H. Smith, Wendy McElroy and Carl Watner began publishing The Voluntaryist magazine. Smith suggested use of the term to identify those libertarians who believed that political action and political parties (especially the Libertarian Party) were antithetical to their ideas. In their "Statement of Purpose" in Neither Bullets nor Ballots: Essays on Voluntaryism (1983), Watner, Smith and McElroy explained that voluntaryists were advocates of non-political strategies to achieve a free society, and effectively appropriated the term on behalf of right-libertarianism. They rejected electoral politics "in theory and practice as incompatible with libertarian goals" and argued that political methods invariably strengthen the legitimacy of coercive governments. In concluding their "Statement of Purpose", they wrote: "Voluntaryists seek instead to delegitimize the State through education, and we advocate the withdrawal of the cooperation and tacit consent on which state power ultimately depends".

== See also ==
- Agorism
- Anarcho-capitalism
- Anarcho-pacifism
- Campaigns against corporal punishment
- Categorical imperative
- Consent theory
- Contractarianism
- Counter-economics
- Deontological libertarianism
- Freedom of contract
- Hans-Hermann Hoppe § Argumentation ethics
- Individualist anarchism
- Issues in anarchism
- Legal pluralism
- Non-aggression principle
- Panarchism
- Personal jurisdiction
- Pluralism (political philosophy)
- Polycentric law
- Privatism
- Propertarianism
- Refusal of work
- Right-libertarianism
- Self-ownership
- Sharing economy
- Unschooling
- Voluntary association
- Voluntary Socialism
