= Consequentialist libertarianism =

Political ideology

Consequentialist libertarianism, also known as consequentialist liberalism or libertarian consequentialism, is a libertarian political philosophy and position that is supportive of a free market and strong private property rights only on the grounds that they bring about favorable consequences such as prosperity or efficiency.

== Overview ==
What consequentialist libertarians advocate is derived through cost–benefit calculation, taking a broad account of consequences. It is contrasted with deontological libertarianism which considers the initiation of force and fraud to be immoral, regardless of consequences. Unlike deontological libertarians, consequentialist libertarians do not necessarily see all cases of initiation of force as immoral and do not see it as inherently immoral (i.e., they do not express a belief in natural rights). Rather, their position is that political and economic liberty lead to the best consequences in the form of happiness and prosperity and for that reason alone it should be supported. Some libertarians may have a conception of libertarianism that is a hybrid of consequentialism and deontology.

Unlike deontological libertarians, consequentialist libertarians advocate actions they believe bring about favorable consequences regardless of whether these constitute initiation of force. For example, unlike deontological libertarians, some consequentialist libertarians support eminent domain and involuntary taxes. Particular views vary among consequentialist libertarians, with political theorist David D. Friedman supporting a consequentialist form of anarcho-capitalism where the content of law is bought and sold rather than there being an established legal code forbidding initiation of force.

== Notable consequentialist libertarians ==
- Milton Friedman
- David D. Friedman
- Peter Leeson
- Ludwig von Mises
- Friedrich Hayek
- R. W. Bradford

== See also ==
- Chicago school of economics
- Classical economics
- Classical liberalism
- Debates within libertarianism
- Dispersed knowledge
- Free-market environmentalism
- Geolibertarianism
- Left-libertarianism
- Natural rights libertarianism
- Night-watchman state
- Optimal tax
- Outline of libertarianism
- Pragmatism
- Public choice
- Right-libertarianism
- Subjective theory of value
- Utilitarianism
