= Chase Oliver 2024 presidential campaign =

American political campaign

- Campaign: 2024 Libertarian Party presidential primaries 2024 United States presidential election
- Candidate: Chase Oliver; Mike ter Maat
- Affiliation: Libertarian Party
- Status: Announced: April 4, 2023; Official nomination: May 26, 2024; Lost Election: November 5, 2024
- EC formed: December 2, 2022
- Key people: Steve Dasbach, campaign manager
- Receipts: US$467,209 (November 25, 2024)
- Slogan(s): Empower Your Future; Chase Your Dreams

Website
- https://www.votechaseoliver.com/

The 2024 presidential campaign of Chase Oliver formally began on April 4, 2023, following the formation of an exploratory committee in December 2022. He officially received the presidential nomination of the Libertarian Party on May 26, 2024. Oliver is a libertarian political activist, as well as a sales account executive, and HR representative. He was the Libertarian nominee in the 2022 United States Senate election in Georgia and the 2020 Georgia's 5th congressional district special election.

== Background ==
Oliver's first campaign for public office was in 2020, as the Libertarian nominee for the 2020 Georgia's 5th congressional district special election to replace John Lewis, who had died earlier that year. Oliver won 2% of the vote in that race and was eliminated during the blanket primary.

He then became Libertarian nominee for the 2022 U.S. Senate election in Georgia, where he faced off against the incumbent Democratic Raphael Warnock and Republican Party challenger Herschel Walker. Oliver participated in an October 2022 debate hosted by Georgia Public Broadcasting and debated against Warnock, as well as an empty podium representing Walker, who had declined to take part in the debate. Oliver received over 2% of the popular vote in that race. Opponents contended that he was a spoiler candidate and that his votes forced the race, which was ultimately won by Warnock, into a run-off.

On December 2, 2022, Oliver formed an exploratory committee to inquire into a possible run for the Libertarian presidential nomination in the 2024 United States presidential election.

== Campaign ==
=== Announcement ===
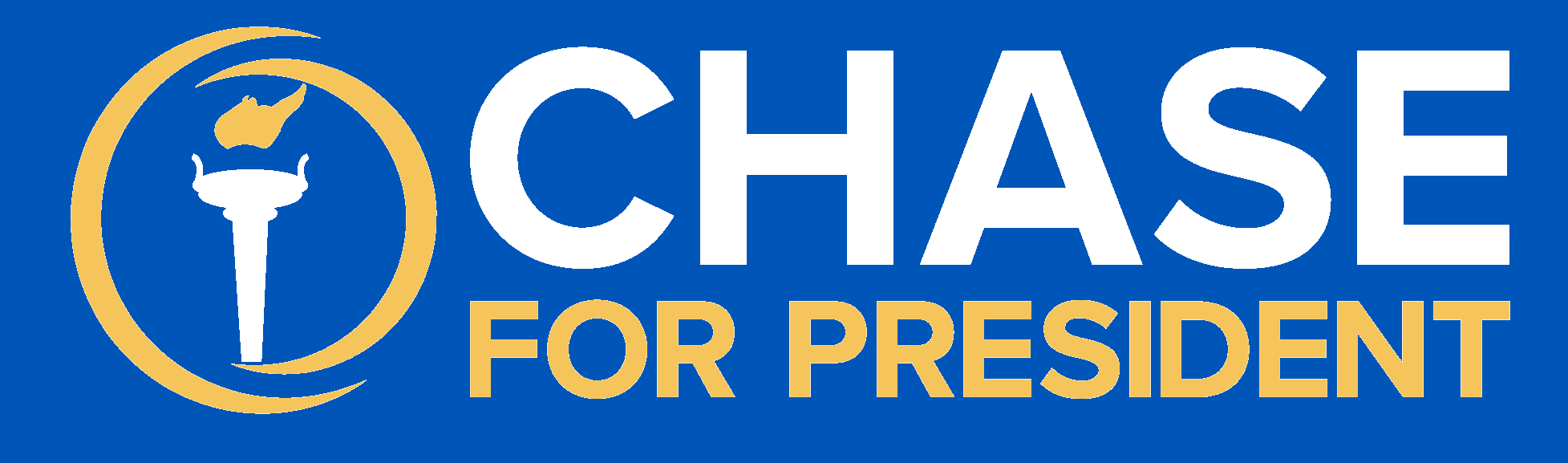
Chase's logo prior to his selection as Libertarian nominee at the 2024 convention.

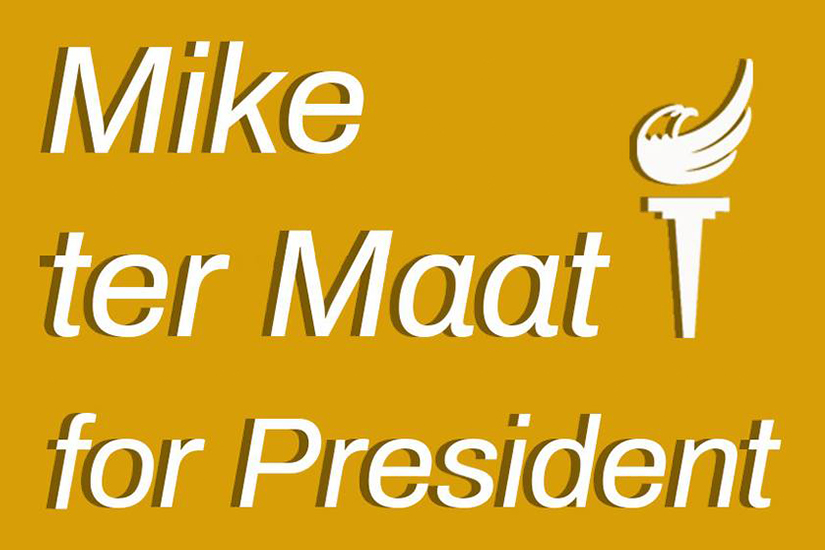
Logo of Chase's running mate, Mike ter Maat, for his own candidacy prior to the convention.

On April 4, 2023, Oliver formally declared his candidacy for the Libertarian presidential nomination.

=== Developments ===
Oliver's campaign was supported by the Classical Liberal Caucus (CLC) during the primaries as a counterweight to the growing influence of the Mises Caucus. The CLC denounced efforts by Robert F. Kennedy Jr. and Donald Trump to seek the Libertarian nomination, stating that neither align with libertarian values, and that inviting them to speak at the convention would poach voters away from the Libertarian Party.

Oliver was described by The Christian Science Monitor as a potential "opening in the middle" that may deliver a reprieve to "voters unhappy with both major-party front-runners" looking for representation from a younger generation.

Throughout the summer of 2023, Oliver campaigned extensively in Iowa. The Gazette described him as a "pro-gun, pro-police reform, pro-choice Libertarian" who is "armed and gay." On August 19, 2023, he spoke at the Des Moines Register Political Soapbox, becoming the first-ever third-party presidential candidate to speak at the event.

Oliver filed to run in Oklahoma's "first Libertarian presidential primary election since the party was formally recognized in 2016". Alongside fellow Libertarian primary candidate Jacob Hornberger, Oliver achieved ballot access by collecting signatures from voters in each Congressional district. He won the Oklahoma primary, which was held on Super Tuesday, on March 5, 2024, with 61% of the vote.

In January 2024, Oliver and fellow Libertarian presidential primary candidate Lars Mapstead successfully collaborated to secure major party status and ballot access for the Libertarian Party of Maine. Afterwards, Oliver went to Iowa in order to campaign ahead of the 2024 Iowa Libertarian presidential caucuses. He won the Iowa caucus with 42.7% of the vote.

On February 29, 2024, Oliver participated in a presidential candidates debate hosted by the Free & Equal Elections Foundation, alongside Party for Socialism and Liberation nominee Claudia De la Cruz, Green Party candidates Jill Stein and Jasmine Sherman, and fellow Libertarian candidate Lars Mapstead.

On May 26, 2024, Oliver officially received the Libertarian Party's presidential nomination at the party's National Convention. That same day, Mike ter Maat was selected as the Libertarian party's vice-presidential nominee and Oliver's running mate.

On June 3, 2024, party chair Angela McArdle, a member of the Mises Caucus, released a video stating that she endorsed Oliver as a vehicle for Donald Trump's victory. McArdle later said of Oliver's candidacy that he's "going to pull two to one from Biden, as opposed to Trump", and that since it would be challenging to get libertarians and right of center independents to vote for Oliver, "what makes the most sense is to lean into the spoiler effect for Joe Biden and the Democrats."

Four state Libertarian parties, in Colorado, Montana, New Hampshire, and Idaho, have publicly "denounced" Oliver's nomination. In the weeks following Oliver's nomination, the state Libertarian parties of Colorado and Montana formally rejected the LNC ticket, with the Colorado affiliate refusing to place him on the ballot. In July 2024, it was announced the Libertarian Party of Colorado would place Robert F. Kennedy Jr. as its presidential nominee, rather than Oliver, whom they reportedly said was "insufficiently aligned with their principles." However, the secretary of the national party submitted the required paperwork recognizing the Oliver/ter Maat slate, which the Colorado Secretary of State accepted. Kennedy will be listed on the ballot there as "Independent."

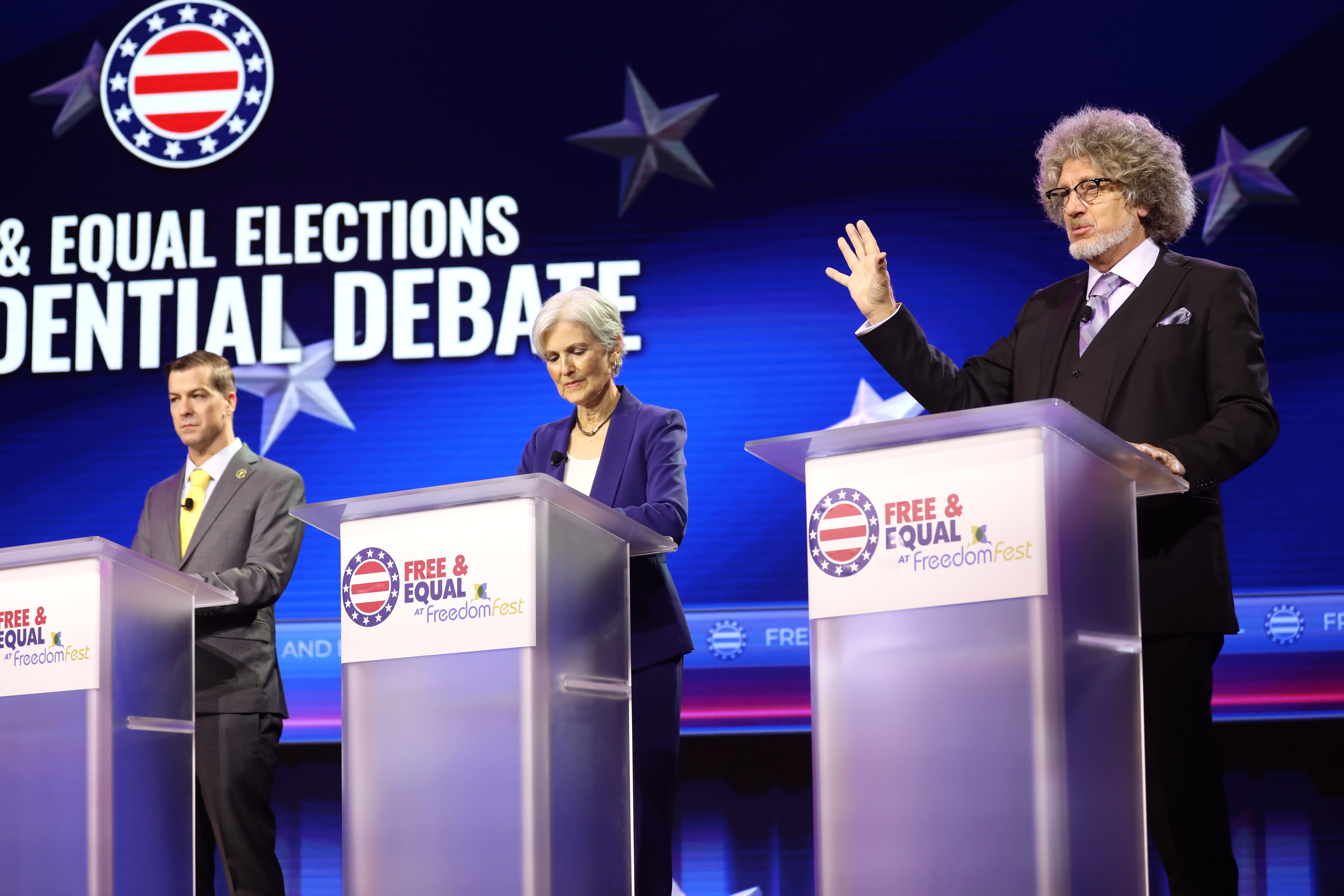
From left to right: Oliver, Stein, and Terry at the Free and Equal debate in Las Vegas.

On July 12, 2024, Oliver participated in another presidential debate hosted by the Free & Equal Elections Foundation alongside Green Party presumptive nominee Jill Stein and Constitution Party nominee Randall Terry at Freedom Fest The debate was moderated by the foundation's chair Christina Tobin, alongside congressman Thomas Massie.

The New York Times reported in October 2024 that Democratic-linked dark money groups were funding ads promoting Oliver, with the goal of eating into Donald Trump's vote share.

== Political positions ==
=== Abortion ===
Oliver self-identifies as pro-choice but is opposed to taxpayer funding for abortion clinics. He has supported the Hyde Amendment in his 2022 senate campaign and would support legislation to make it available nationwide.

=== Climate change ===
Oliver supports letting the free market find the solution to climate change. He contends that if businesses are left alone, they will be incentivized to develop technologies that will eventually replace current carbon-based fuels.

=== Electoral reform ===
Oliver is a strong supporter of ranked-choice voting in the United States, which he has said would have prevented the 2022 U.S. Senate election in Georgia from going to a run-off by allowing voters to rank their preferred candidates when they voted the first time. He has also stated that ranked-choice voting would save millions of taxpayer dollars by allowing run-offs to be instant, while ensuring that winning candidates always get above 50% of the vote. Rolling Stone called him the most influential Libertarian of the year.

=== Economy ===
Oliver supports free trade and opposes tariffs. He supports a balanced federal budget and reducing inflation, and has supported the idea of returning to the gold standard. He also supports ending the Federal Reserve.

=== Foreign policy ===
Oliver promotes a non-interventionist foreign policy, stating that "It's just not a great combination when you're exporting our weapons to autocrats around the world". He has criticized both Presidents Biden and Trump for their foreign policy, believing that the both of them are "authoritarians" in nature. He supports the closure of all military bases and opposes foreign aid.

==== Israel ====
Oliver has condemned the October 7th attacks. Still, he has also been critical of the Israeli government on multiple occasions and has labeled the Gaza war as a "genocide". Oliver has called for a ceasefire.

Oliver has additionally stated he would end all support to Israel and Ukraine, stating "While we offer moral support to our friends currently engaged with the enemy, we should not be contributing to extending the fight."

=== Immigration ===
Oliver supports an "Ellis Island-style immigration" system, stating: "If you're coming here to work and be peaceful, it's not my business."

== Ballot access ==
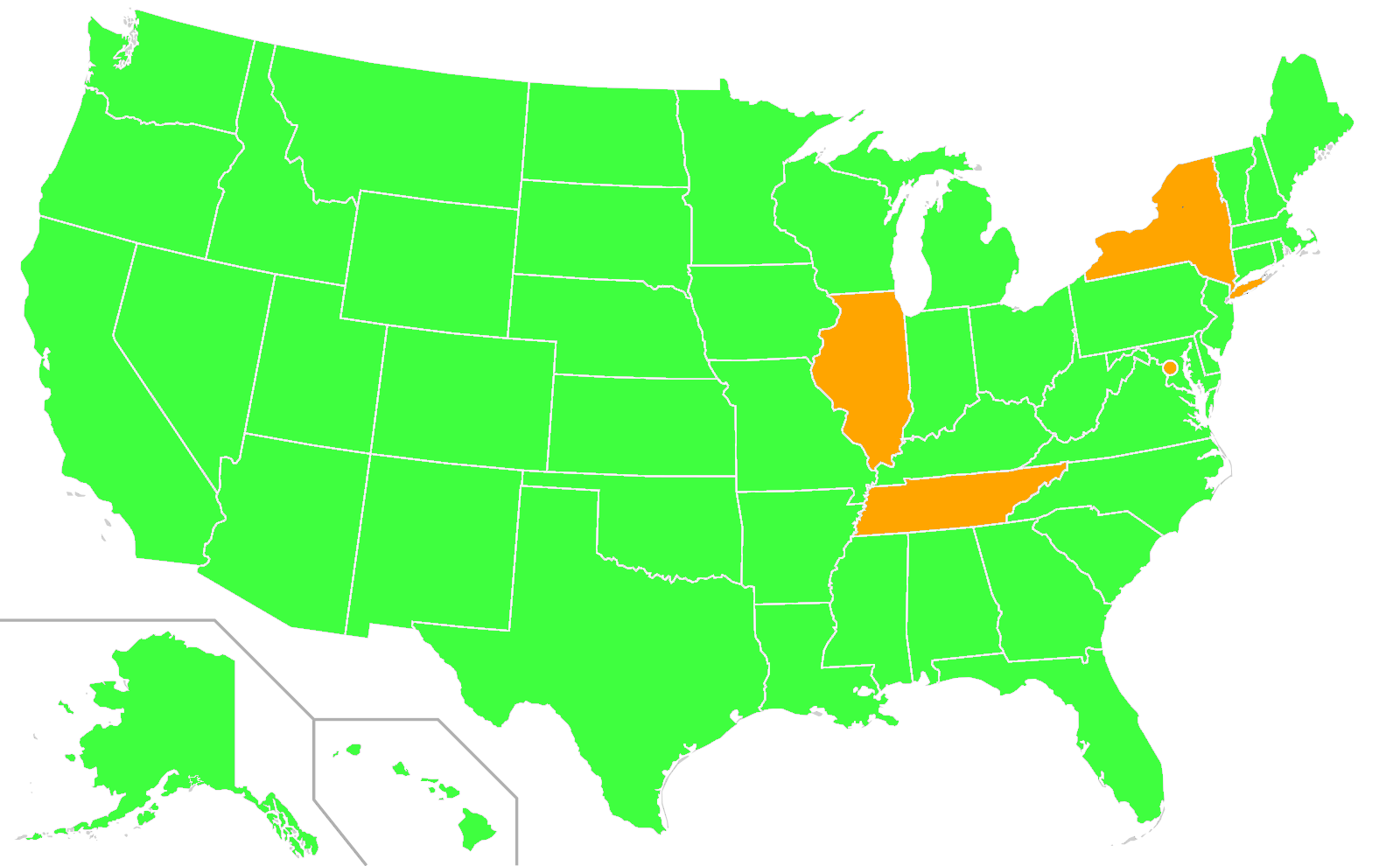
Oliver ballot access for the 2024 presidential election: Certified for ballot (47 states, 477 electors) (Note: Oliver on the ballot in: Alabama (9, as Independent); Alaska (3); Arizona (11); Arkansas (6); California (54); Colorado (10); Connecticut (7); Delaware (3); Florida (30); Georgia (16); Hawaii (4); Idaho (4); Indiana (11); Iowa (6); Kansas (6); Kentucky (8); Louisiana (8); Maine (4); Maryland (10); Massachusetts (11); Michigan (15); Minnesota (10); Mississippi (6); Missouri (10); Montana (4); Nebraska (5); Nevada (6); New Hampshire (4); New Jersey (14); New Mexico (5); North Carolina (16); North Dakota (3); Ohio (17); Oklahoma (7); Oregon (8); Pennsylvania (19); Rhode Island (4); South Carolina (9); South Dakota (3); Texas (40); Utah (6); Vermont (3); Virginia (13); Washington (12); West Virginia (4); Wisconsin (10); Wyoming (3)) Registered write-in (3 states + D.C., 61 electors) (Note: Oliver registered write-in in: District of Columbia (3); Illinois (19); New York (28); Tennessee (11))

Oliver achieved ballot access in 47 states.

== Endorsements ==
=== Organizations ===
- Classical Liberal Caucus
- Franklin County Libertarian Party of Ohio

=== Notable individuals ===
- Ronald Bailey, libertarian science writer
- Nick Gillespie, libertarian journalist, editor of Reason
- Gary Johnson, Former governor of New Mexico (1995–2003), 2012 and 2016 Libertarian candidate for President of the United States.
- Robby Soave, libertarian journalist, editor of Reason
- John Stossel, television personality and political pundit
- Jacob Sullum, columnist, senior editor of Reason
- Jesse Walker, books editor of Reason

== Polling ==
=== Nationwide ===
As of May 2024, Oliver has been included in two national presidential polls:

Poll source	Date	Sample size (Note: Key: A – all adults RV – registered voters LV – likely voters V – unclear)	Margin of error	Joe Biden Democratic	Donald Trump Republican	Robert F. Kennedy Jr. Independent	Cornel West Independent	Chase Oliver Libertarian	Jill Stein Green	Other/ Undecided
Data for Progress (D)/Zeteo	May 1–2, 2024	1,240 (LV)	± 3.0%	40%	41%	12%	1%	0%	1%	5%
Data for Progress (D)	March 27–29, 2024	1,200 (LV)	± 3.0%	41%	42%	8%	1%	1%	1%	6%

=== Statewide ===
And one poll in Iowa:

Poll source	Date(s) administered	Sample size	Margin of error	Donald Trump Republican	Joe Biden Democratic	Robert F. Kennedy Jr. Independent	Chase Oliver Libertarian	Other / Undecided
Selzer & Co.	June 9–14, 2024	632 (LV)	± 3.9%	50%	32%	9%	2%	7% (Note: "Someone else" with 3%, "would not vote" with 1%)

== Reception ==
=== Criticism ===
Oliver has been criticized by some conservative pundits as being "woke". His nomination was considered polarizing within the Libertarian Party, with members of the Mises Caucus declaring their opposition. This led state parties to refuse to add him to the ballot, such as the Libertarian Party of Colorado which tried to place independent candidate Robert F. Kennedy Jr. on the Libertarian ballot line instead. The Libertarian Party Secretary Caryn Harlos sent Certificates of Nomination to state secretaries of state herself, and Oliver gained ballot access in Colorado as well, against the wishes of state party leadership. This and other disputes with Harlos led to the Libertarian National Committee initiating proceedings to remove her from office, which has been opposed by many non-Mises Libertarians.

In September 2024, Oliver condemned a post by Libertarian Party of New Hampshire's X account which appeared to favorably consider the prospect of someone murdering Democratic nominee Kamala Harris. In response, the party's account called Oliver a "faggot" and labeled him an "infiltrating leftist snake".

=== Results ===
Chase Oliver received 635,551 total votes and 0.42% of the national vote, coming fifth in the nation. He achieved the Libertarian Party's lowest vote since the 2008 presidential election.

Oliver received 1.69% in North Dakota, his best state by percentage. Oliver also received over one percent of the vote in Utah and Wyoming.

Following the election, in an interview with Reason, Oliver stated the possibility of potentially running again in the 2028 elections.
