= Norms of Liberty =

Norms of Liberty: A Perfectionist Basis for Non-Perfectionist Politics
- Cover of the first edition
- Authors: Douglas B. Rasmussen; Douglas Den Uyl
- Language: English
- Subject: Political philosophy
- Publisher: Penn State University Press
- Publication date: 2005
- Publication place: United States
- Media type: Print
- Pages: 380 pp
- ISBN: 0-271-02701-0
- OCLC: 57168509
- Dewey Decimal: 323.44/01 22
- LC Class: JC585 .R37 2005

Norms of Liberty: A Perfectionist Basis for Non-Perfectionist Politics is a 2005 work of political philosophy by the philosophers Douglas B. Rasmussen and Douglas Den Uyl.

== Availability ==
Norms of Liberty: A Perfectionist Basis for Non-Perfectionist Politics is available in paperback under ISBN 0-271-02701-0 (University Park, PA: Penn State University Press, 2005).
