= Liberty and Nature =

Liberty and Nature: An Aristotelian Defense of Liberal Order
- Cover of the first edition
- Authors: Douglas B. Rasmussen; Douglas Den Uyl
- Language: English
- Subject: Political philosophy
- Publisher: Open Court Publishing Company
- Publication date: 1991
- Publication place: United States
- Media type: Print (hardcover · paperback)
- Pages: 288
- ISBN: 978-0-8126-9120-7
- LC Class: JC71.A7 R37 1990

Liberty and Nature: An Aristotelian Defense of Liberal Order is a 1991 political philosophy book by the philosophers Douglas B. Rasmussen and Douglas Den Uyl.
