= Privatism =

Economic ideology

Privatism is a generic term generally describing any belief that people have a right to the private ownership of certain things. According to different perspectives, it describes also the attitude of people to be concerned only about ideas or facts that affect them as individuals.

There are many degrees of privatism, from the advocacy of limited private property over specific kinds of items (personal property) to the advocacy of unrestricted private property over everything; such as in anarcho-capitalism. Regarding public policy, it gives primacy to the private sector as the central agent for action, necessitates the social and economic benefits for private initiatives and competition, and "legitimizes the public consequences of private action"

== Sociology ==
Privatism is based on the concept of individual sphere of interactions. According to this point of view, collective efforts can not be meaningful by themselves, but they can gain meaning only if considered as a sum of individual activities.

Hence, every single action (economical, social, spiritual and so on) can be seen only as the result of an individual choice. For this reason, privatism is based on the concept of individual consumption. Indeed, the private consumption reflects the singular choice of the consumer that according to his own value and prerogatives decide how to consume its own income.

== Political theory ==
The political ideals of privatism are directly consequent of the interpretation of society as just the sum of individuals that compose it. Indeed, privatism supporters believe that the economic role of the welfare state should be reduced, giving more freedom to consumers and private volunteering organizations to operate inside the economic environment. According to this view, the private allocation of resources would be more efficient and less authoritarian than the one provided by the state.

From this point of view, the formation of common social and political views on various topics, is connected to the free choice of individuals. Moreover, as considered by Jürgen Habermas, their ability to create these opinions would be damaged by the excessive role of the state that would limit the creation of volunteering and private societies and so the social and political debate inside a society.

One of the main examples of privatism-driven action in politics, can be represented by the action of Margaret Thatcher towards the British welfare state, that during the 80’s was deeply defunded and reduced of importance.

=== Left-wing criticism ===
In general, privatism is used in the context of left-wing politics to distinguish ideologies which support private ownership of an economy's means of production and those who desire abolishing it in favour of either collective ownership or common ownership. The term is not held as being synonymous with capitalism, however, as the capitalist mode of production is generally understood to be characterized by attributes beyond the private ownership of the means of production.

According to an interpretation given by George Lipsitz, privatism needs to be considered hostile towards social life of a community, because it results in segregation and extreme inequalities. Moreover, in his perspective, privatism supporters tend to be less involved in social life leading to severe consequences on the social environment.

== See also ==
- Capitalism
- Propertarianism
- Privatization
