= Objectivism and libertarianism =

Philosophical interactions

Although Ayn Rand opposed libertarianism, which she viewed as anti-capitalist, her philosophy of Objectivism has been, and continues to be, a major influence on the right-libertarian movement, particularly libertarianism in the United States. Many libertarians justify their political views using aspects of Objectivism.

== Philosophical disagreements ==
=== Aggression ===
Some right-libertarians, including Murray Rothbard and Walter Block, hold the view that the non-aggression principle is an irreducible concept: it is not the logical result of any given ethical philosophy, but rather is self-evident as any other axiom is. Rand argued that liberty was a precondition of virtuous conduct, but that her non-aggression principle itself derived from a complex set of previous knowledge and values. For this reason, Objectivists refer to the non-aggression principle as such while libertarians who agree with Rothbard's argument call it "the non-aggression axiom".

Rothbard and other anarcho-capitalists hold that government requires non-voluntary taxation to function and that in all known historical cases, the state was established by force rather than social contract. Thus, they consider the establishment and maintenance of the night-watchman state supported by Objectivists to be in violation of the non-aggression principle. On the other hand, Rand believed that government can in principle be funded through voluntary means. Voluntary financing notwithstanding, some libertarians consider that a government would by definition still violate individual rights (commit aggression) by enforcing a monopoly over a given territory.

=== Objectivism's rejection of the "primitive" ===
In her biography Goddess of the Market: Ayn Rand and the American Right, Jennifer Burns notes Rand's position that "Native Americans were savages" and that as a result "European colonists had a right to seize their land because native tribes did not recognize individual rights" was one of the views that "particularly outraged libertarians". Burns also notes how Rand's position that "Palestinians had no rights and that it was moral to support Israel, the sole outpost of civilization in a region ruled by barbarism" was also a controversial position amongst libertarians, who at the time were a large portion of Rand's fan base.

=== Foreign policy ===
Libertarians and Objectivists have disagreed about matters of foreign policy. Following the Arab–Israeli War of 1973, Rand denounced Arabs as "primitive" and "one of the least developed cultures" who "are practically nomads". She said Arab resentment for Israel was a result of the Jewish state being "the sole beachhead of modern science and civilization on their continent" and referred to the Israelis as "civilized men fighting savages". Later Objectivists, such as Leonard Peikoff, David Kelley, and Yaron Brook, have continued to hold pro-Israel positions since Rand's death.

Most scholars of the right-libertarian Cato Institute have opposed military intervention against Iran, while the Objectivist Ayn Rand Institute has supported forceful intervention in Iran.

== Rand's influence on libertarianism ==
United States Libertarian Party's first candidate for President John Hospers credited Rand as a major force in shaping his own political beliefs. David Boaz, executive vice president of the Cato Institute, an American libertarian think tank, described Rand's work as "squarely within the libertarian tradition" and that some libertarians are put off by "the starkness of her presentation and by her cult following". Milton Friedman described Rand as "an utterly intolerant and dogmatic person who did a great deal of good". One Rand biographer quoted Murray Rothbard as saying that he was "in agreement basically with all [Rand's] philosophy" and that it was Rand who had "convinced him of the theory of natural rights". Rothbard would later become a particularly harsh critic of Rand, writing in The Sociology of the Ayn Rand Cult:

The major lesson of the history of the [Objectivist] movement to libertarians is that It Can Happen Here, that libertarians, despite explicit devotion to reason and individuality, are not exempt from the mystical and totalitarian cultism that pervades other ideological as well as religious movements. Hopefully, libertarians, once bitten by the virus, may now prove immune.

Some Objectivists have argued that Objectivism is not limited to Rand's own positions on philosophical issues and are willing to work with, and identify with, the libertarian movement. This stance is most clearly identified with David Kelley (who separated from the Ayn Rand Institute because of disagreements over the relationship between Objectivists and libertarians), Chris Sciabarra, Barbara Branden (Nathaniel Branden's former wife) and others. Kelley's Atlas Society has focused on building a closer relationship between "open Objectivists" and the libertarian movement.

== Rand's view of libertarians ==
Rand condemned libertarianism as being a greater threat to freedom and capitalism than both modern liberalism and conservatism. Rand regarded Objectivism as an integrated philosophical system. In contrast, libertarianism is a political philosophy which confines its attention to matters of public policy. For example, Objectivism argues positions in metaphysics, epistemology and ethics whereas libertarianism does not address such questions. Rand believed that political advocacy could not succeed without addressing what she saw as its methodological prerequisites. Rand rejected any affiliation with the libertarian movement and many other Objectivists have done so as well.

Of libertarians, Rand said:

They're not defenders of capitalism. They're a group of publicity seekers. [...] Most of them are my enemies. [...] I've read nothing by Libertarians (when I read them, in the early years) that wasn't my ideas badly mishandled—i.e., the teeth pulled out of them—with no credit given.

In a 1981 interview, Rand described libertarians as "a monstrous, disgusting bunch of people" who "plagiarize my ideas when that fits their purpose".

Responding to a question about the Libertarian Party of the United States in 1976, Rand said:

The trouble with the world today is philosophical: only the right philosophy can save us. But this party plagiarizes some of my ideas, mixes them with the exact opposite—with religionists, anarchists and every intellectual misfit and scum they can find—and call themselves libertarians and run for office.

== Rapprochement ==
Ayn Rand Institute board member John Allison spoke at the Cato Club 200 Retreat in September 2012, contributed "The Real Causes of the Financial Crisis" to Cato's Letter and spoke at Cato's Monetary Conference in November 2011.

On June 25, 2012, the Cato Institute announced that Allison would become its next president. In Cato's public announcement, Allison was described as a "revered libertarian". In communication to Cato employees, he wrote: "I believe almost all the name calling between libertarians and objectivists is irrational. I have come to appreciate that all objectivists are libertarians, but not all libertarians are objectivists".

On October 15, 2012, Brook explained the changes to The American Conservative:

I don't think there's been a significant change in terms of our attitude towards libertarians. Two things have happened. We've grown, and we've gotten to a size where we don't just do educational programs, we do a lot more outreach and a lot more policy and working with other organizations. I also believe the libertarian movement has changed. It's become less influenced by Rothbard, less influenced by the anarchist, crazy for lack of a better word, wing of libertarianism. As a consequence, because we're bigger and doing more things and because libertarianism has become more reasonable, we are doing more work with them than we have in the past. But I don't think ideologically anything of substance has changed at the Institute.

== See also ==
- Objectivist movement
- Outline of libertarianism
