= The Philosophic Thought of Ayn Rand =

1984 book edited by Douglas Den Uyl and Douglas B. Rasmussen

- Cover of the first edition
- Editors: Douglas Den Uyl; Douglas B. Rasmussen
- Language: English
- Subjects: Ayn Rand; Objectivism
- Publisher: University of Illinois Press
- Publication date: 1984
- Publication place: United States
- Media type: Print (hardcover · paperback)
- Pages: 284
- ISBN: 978-0-252-01407-9

The Philosophic Thought of Ayn Rand is a 1984 collection of essays on Ayn Rand's philosophy of Objectivism, edited by Douglas Den Uyl and Douglas B. Rasmussen. It includes essays by nine different authors covering Rand's views in various areas of philosophy. The work received positive reviews, crediting it with bringing serious attention by philosophers to Rand and her work. However, reviewers also noted that the work assumed considerable prior knowledge of philosophy on the part of the reader.

== Contents ==
The book is divided into three sections that represent different areas of philosophy addressed in Rand's thought. Each section starts with an essay by Den Uyl and Rasmussen, followed by essays from other contributors. The first section covers metaphysics and epistemology. It includes essays by Wallace Matson and Robert Hollinger. The second section covers ethics and contains essays by Jack Wheeler, Charles King, and Erick Mack. The final section covers political philosophy and has essays by Antony Flew and Tibor R. Machan.

== Publication history ==
Den Uyl and Rassmussen began work on the book while Rand was still alive. When she heard about the project, she actively discouraged it, as she had done previously with other projects. Rand died in 1982, and work on the book proceeded despite her disapproval.

The Philosophic Thought of Ayn Rand was first published by as a hardcover book by the University of Illinois Press in 1984. They released it as a paperback in 1986.

== Reception ==
Sidney Gendin gave The Philosophic Thought of Ayn Rand a positive review in Library Journal, writing that the work redressed the neglect of Rand's work by academic philosophers, avoided being uncritical of Rand, and revealed interesting parallels between Rand and writers such as Gilbert Ryle and J. L. Austin. However, he noted that the book assumed that the reader had "considerable background in general philosophy". A review in The Freeman praised the book as "a valuable beginning by serious philosophers at the important task of evaluating, describing, and developing Rand's philosophy, in a dispassionate, objective manner."

In Reason, the philosopher Randall Dipert wrote that the book "marks a turning point" in getting professional philosophers engaged with Rand's ideas, but was not "uniformly successful". Rand scholar Mimi Reisel Gladstein described it as "a major contribution to Rand scholarship", although not always approachable for readers not versed in academic philosophy. In 2003, Chris Matthew Sciabarra identified The Philosophic Thought of Ayn Rand as one of several books that reflected a growing interest in Rand after her death.
