= Propertarianism =

Legal theory of property rights

Propertarianism, or proprietarianism, is a political philosophy that reduces all questions of law to the right to own property. On property rights, it advocates private property on the basis of Lockean sticky property norms, where an owner keeps their property more or less until they consent to gift or sell it, rejecting the Lockean proviso. Propertarianism is often described by its advocates as either synonymous with capitalism or its logical conclusion.

Closely related to and overlapping with right-libertarianism, it is also often accompanied with the idea that state monopoly law should be replaced by market-generated law centered on contractual relationships. Propertarian ideals are most commonly cited to advocate for an anarcho-capitalist or minarchist society, with governance systems either limited to enforcing contracts and private property or abolished through total privatization of its basic functions.

== History ==
The term appears to have been coined by Edward Cain in 1963:

Since their use of the word "liberty" refers almost exclusively to property, it would be helpful if we had some other word, such as "propertarian," to describe them. [...] Novelist Ayn Rand is not a conservative at all but claims to be very relevant. She is a radical capitalist, and is the closest to what I mean by a propertarian.

Marcus Cunliffe defined propertarianism in his 1973 lectures as "characteristic values of American history" in regard to property.

Philosopher Robert Nozick formalized Locke's approach in his book "Anarchy, State, and Utopia" with the Entitlement Theory of Justice, specifying criteria for just original acquisition, just transfer, and rectification.

David Boaz writes that the "propertarian approach to privacy", both morally and legally, has ensured Americans' privacy rights.

Markus Verhaegh states that Rothbardian anarcho-capitalism advocates the neo-Lockean idea that property only legitimately originates from labor and may then only legitimately change hands by trade or gift. Brian Doherty describes Murray Rothbard's form of libertarianism as propertarian because he "reduced all human rights to rights of property, beginning with the natural right of self-ownership".

L. Neil Smith describes propertarianism as a positive libertarian philosophy in his alternate history novels The Probability Broach (1980) and The American Zone (2002).

== Alternative meanings ==
Hans Morgenthau used propertarianism to characterize the connection between property and suffrage.

== Criticism ==
In the science fiction novel The Dispossessed (1974), author Ursula K. Le Guin contrasted a propertarian statist society with an anarchist anti-propertarian society in an attempt to show that property and state objectified human beings.

Murray Bookchin objected to propertarians calling themselves libertarians, arguing:

We have permitted cynical political reactionaries and the spokesmen of large corporations to pre-empt these basic libertarian American ideals. We have permitted them not only to become the specious voice of these ideals such that individualism has been used to justify egotism; the pursuit of happiness to justify greed, and even our emphasis on local and regional autonomy has been used to justify parochialism, insularism, and exclusivity – often against ethnic minorities and so-called deviant individuals. We have even permitted these reactionaries to stake out a claim to the word libertarian, a word, in fact, that was literally devised in the 1890s in France by Elisée Reclus as a substitute for the word anarchist, which the government had rendered an illegal expression for identifying one's views. The propertarians, in effect – acolytes of Ayn Rand, the earth mother of greed, egotism, and the virtues of property – have appropriated expressions and traditions that should have been expressed by radicals but were willfully neglected because of the lure of European and Asian traditions of socialism, socialisms that are now entering into decline in the very countries in which they originated.

Bookchin described three concepts of possession: property itself; possession; and usufruct (i.e. appropriation of resources by virtue of use.)

Some critics charge that this prevents freedom from making sense as an independent value in anarcho capitalist theory:

Looking at Rothbard’s definition of "liberty" quoted above, we can see that freedom is actually no longer considered to be a fundamental, independent concept. Instead, freedom is a derivative of something more fundamental, namely the "legitimate rights" of an individual, which are identified as property rights. In other words, given that "anarcho"-capitalists and right libertarians in general consider the right to property as "absolute," it follows that freedom and property become one and the same. This suggests an alternative name for the right Libertarian, namely "Propertarian." And, needless to say, if we do not accept the right-libertarians’ view of what constitutes "legitimate" "rights," then their claim to be defenders of liberty is weak.

— Iain Mckay.(2008/2012), Appendix: Anarchism and "Anarcho"-capitalism.

Matt Zwolinski has argued that scholars influenced by Rothbard could be called "propertarians" because the concept that really plays a central role in their research is property rather than liberty.

== See also ==
- Anarcho-capitalism
- Capitalism
- Classical liberalism
- Creative disruption
- Entitlement theory
- Individualism
- Outline of libertarianism
- Private law society
- Private property
- Privatism
- Privatization
- Producerism
- Right-libertarianism
- Sovereign citizen movement
