= Douglas Den Uyl =

American philosopher

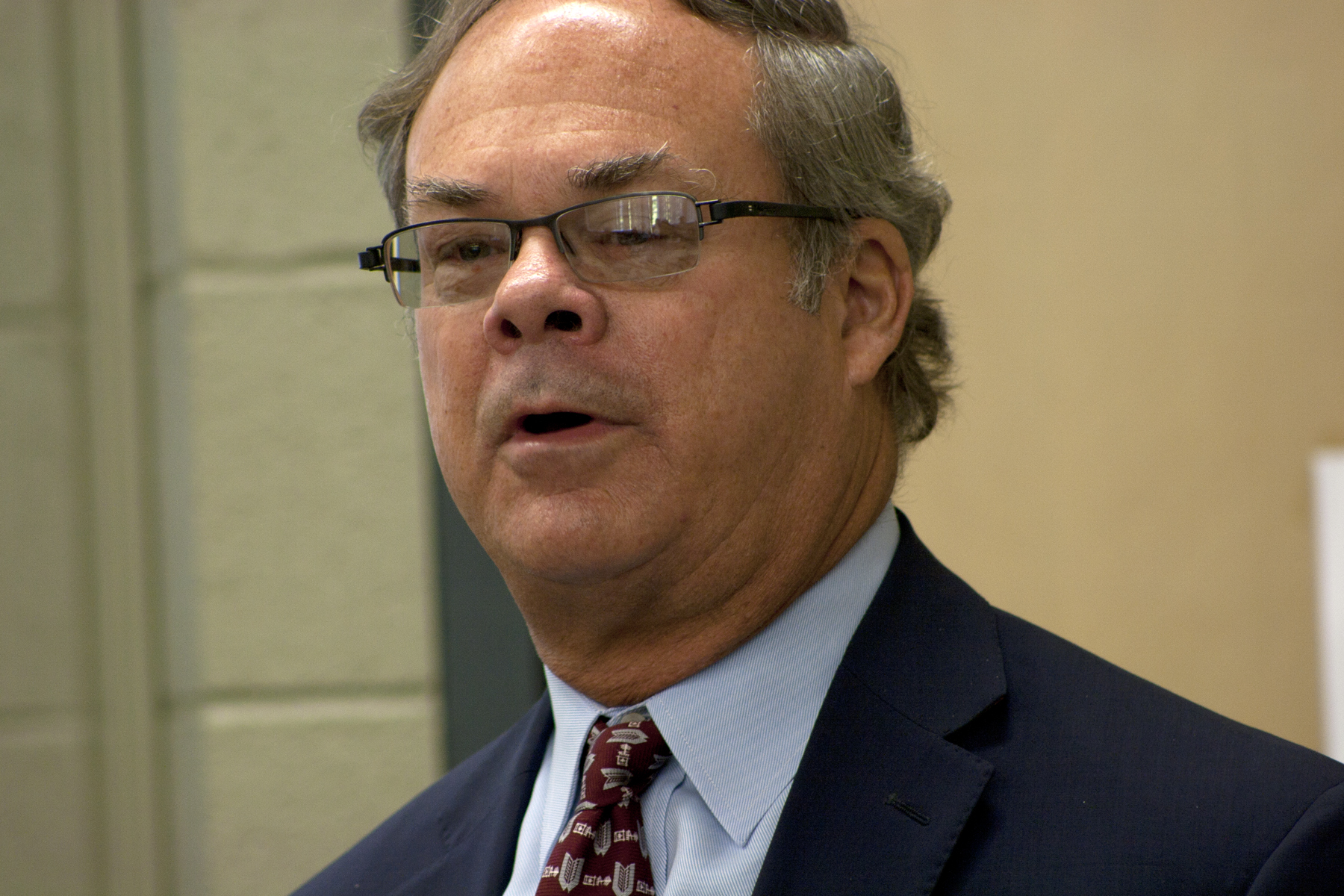
Douglas J. Den Uyl

Douglas J. Den Uyl (born 1950) is vice president of educational programs at Liberty Fund.

== Biography ==
Den Uyl earned his B.A. from Kalamazoo College, his MA from the University of Chicago, and his Ph.D. from Marquette University. Den Uyl's areas of scholarly interest include the history of ideas, moral and political theory, and has published essays or books on Spinoza, Smith, Shaftesbury, Mandeville and others. He taught philosophy and was department chair and full professor at Bellarmine College (now Bellarmine University) before coming to Liberty Fund. He is a member of the Mont Pelerin Society. Den Uyl has contributed articles to journals such as Journal of the History of Philosophy, Social Philosophy and Policy, and Journal of Applied Philosophy, as well as The Encyclopedia of Libertarianism.

Den Uyl is the author of The Virtue of Prudence (1991), The Fountainhead: An American Novel (1999), and God, Man, & Well-Being: Spinoza's Modern Humanism (2008).

Den Uyl coauthored (with Douglas B. Rasmussen) several books: Liberty and Nature: An Aristotelian Defense of Liberal Order (1991); Liberalism Defended: The Challenge of Post-Modernity (1997); and Norms of Liberty: A Perfectionist Basis for Non-Perfectionist Politics (2005). He also co-edited (with Rasmussen) The Philosophic Thought of Ayn Rand (1984).

A collection of scholarly essays about Rasmussen and Den Uyl's Norms of Liberty, Reading Rasmussen and Den Uyl: Critical Essays on "Norms of Liberty", edited by Aeon J. Skoble, was published in 2008.
