= Douglas B. Rasmussen =

American political philosopher (born 1948)

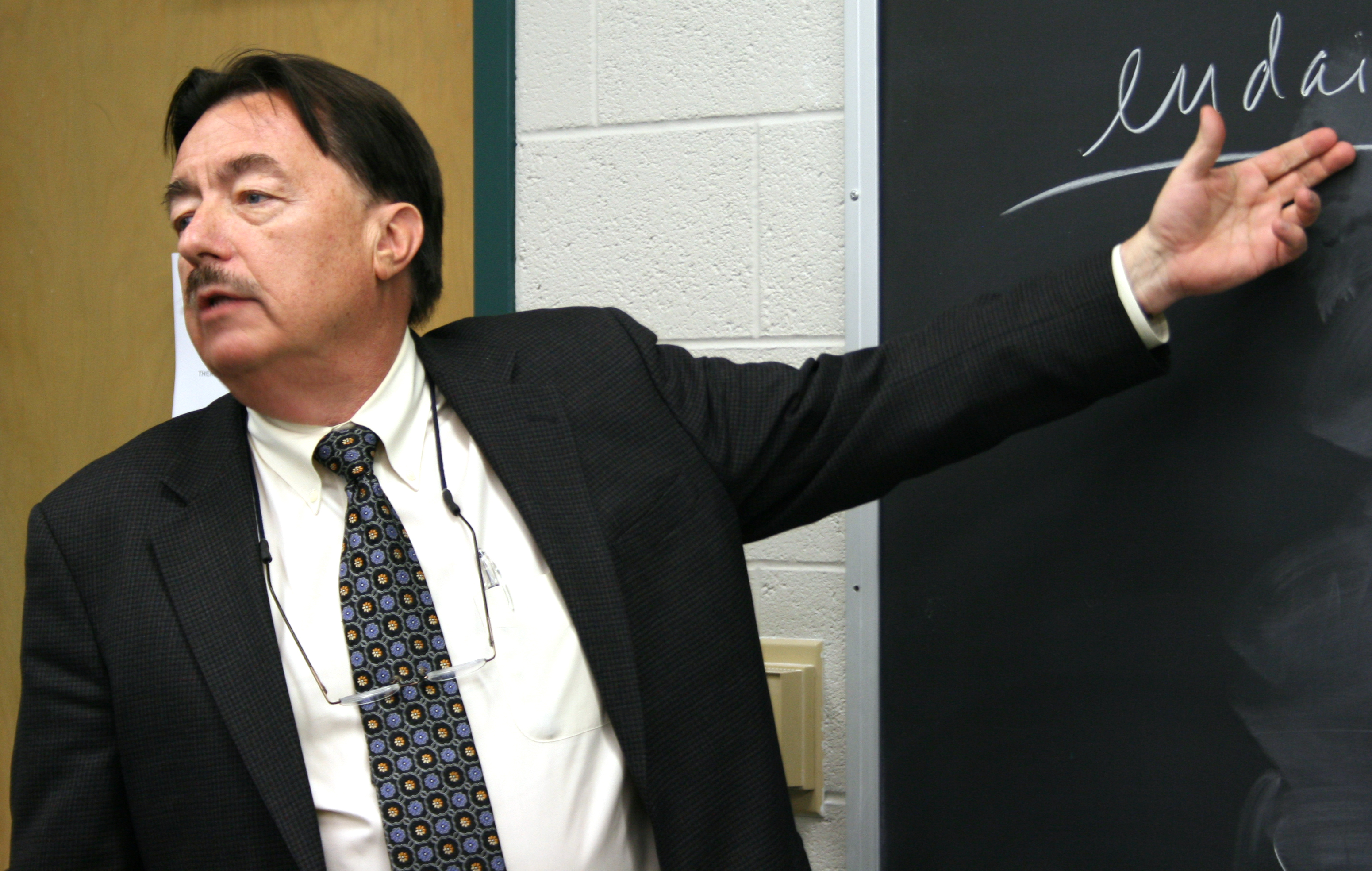
- Douglas B. Rasmussen in 2010
- Born: 1948 (age 77–78)
- Occupation: Professor
- Writing career
- Notable works: The Philosophic Thought of Ayn Rand (editor), Liberty and Nature: An Aristotelian Defense of Liberal Order (with Den Uyl)

Douglas B. Rasmussen (born 1948) is professor of philosophy at St. John's University, where he has taught since 1981.

== Biography ==
Rasmussen earned his B.A. (1971) from the University of Iowa, and his Ph.D. (1980) in Philosophy from Marquette University. Rasmussen's areas of scholarly interest include Political Philosophy, Ethics, Ontology, Epistemology, Business Ethics, and Political Economy.

Rasmussen has contributed articles to leading journals such as American Philosophical Quarterly, International Philosophical Quarterly, The New Scholasticism, Public Affairs Quarterly, The Review of Metaphysics, American Catholic Philosophical Quarterly, Social Philosophy and Policy, and The Thomist.

Rasmussen coauthored (with Douglas Den Uyl) several books: Liberty and Nature: An Aristotelian Defense of Liberal Order (1991); Liberalism Defended: The Challenge of Post-Modernity (1997); and Norms of Liberty: A Perfectionist Basis for Non-Perfectionist Politics (2005). He also co-edited (with Den Uyl) The Philosophic Thought of Ayn Rand (1984).

A collection of scholarly essays about Rasmussen and Den Uyl's Norms of Liberty, Reading Rasmussen and Den Uyl: Critical Essays on "Norms of Liberty", edited by Aeon J. Skoble, was published in 2008.
