= Paleolibertarianism =

Right-wing political activism strategy

Paleolibertarianism (also known as the "Paleo strategy") is a right-libertarian political activism strategy aimed at uniting libertarians and paleoconservatives. It was developed by American anarcho-capitalist theorists Murray Rothbard and Lew Rockwell in the American political context after the end of the Cold War. From 1989 to 1995, they sought to communicate libertarian opposition to government intervention through messages accessible to the working class and middle class of the time. They combined libertarian free market views with the cultural conservatism of paleoconservatism, while also opposing protectionism. The strategy also embraced the paleoconservative reverence for tradition and religion. This approach, usually identified as right-wing populism, was intended to radicalize citizens against the state. The name they chose for this style of activism evoked the roots of modern libertarianism, hence the prefix paleo. That founding movement was American classical liberalism, which shared the anti-war and anti-New Deal sentiments of the Old Right in the first half of the 20th century. Paleolibertarianism is commonly classified by political scientists and commentators as a right-wing form of libertarianism due to its combination of libertarian economic views with cultural conservatism.

The paleolibertarian strategy was expected to shift the libertarian movement away from the influence of public policy-oriented libertarian organizations based in Washington, D.C. (which were accused of failing to communicate the full libertarian message and of adopting Beltway political and cultural values to gain acceptance among the political elite) and to simultaneously shift American right-wing politics away from the neoconservative movement and its promotion of hawkish or interventionist foreign policy, usually characterized as imperialist by libertarian thinkers.

== Tenets ==
According to Rockwell, the paleolibertarian movement hearkens back to such thinkers as "Ludwig von Mises, Albert Jay Nock, Garet Garrett, and the entire interwar Old Right that opposed the New Deal and favored the Old Republic" and distinguishes itself from neo-libertarians, Beltway libertarianism (a pejorative term used by hardline libertarians to describe those who have gained traction in the Beltway, i.e., Washington, D.C., and are accused of surrendering libertarian values to Beltway values in order to improve public relations with the political elite), left-libertarianism and lifestyle libertarianism. According to Rockwell, paleolibertarianism "made its peace with religion as the bedrock of liberty, property, and the natural order".

Paleolibertarianism developed in opposition to the link between social avant-garde and libertarianism as though they were indivisible issues. In his 1990 essay "The Case for Paleo-Libertarianism", Rockwell charged mainstream libertarians with "hatred of Western culture". He argued that "pornographic photography, 'free'-thinking, chaotic painting, atonal music, deconstructionist literature, Bauhaus architecture, and modernist films have nothing in common with the libertarian political agenda—no matter how much individual libertarians may revel in them". Of paleolibertarians, he wrote that "we obey, and we ought to obey, traditions of manners and taste". After explaining why libertarians friendly with conventional culture could make a better argument for liberty to the middle classes, Rockwell predicted, "in the new movement, libertarians who personify the present corruption will sink to their natural level, as will the Libertarian Party, which has been their diabolic pulpit".

In short, according to Lew Rockwell, the motivation of this "paleo" libertarian movement, in contrast with the "modal" libertarian movement of the Beltway and the Libertarian Party as it existed in the early '90s, was the application of libertarian principles in ways that led to the radicalization of the middle classes against the state.

== History ==
In the 1992 essay "Right-Wing Populism: A Strategy for the Paleo Movement", Rothbard reflected on libertarians' ability to gain the disaffected working-class and middle-class by using right-wing populist methods to deliver libertarian ideas.

In the 1990s, a "paleoconservative-paleolibertarian alliance was forged", centered on the John Randolph Club, founded in 1989 by traditionalist Catholic Thomas Fleming and Rothbard. Rockwell and Rothbard supported paleoconservative Republican candidate Pat Buchanan in the 1992 presidential election and described Buchanan as the political leader of the "paleo movement". In 1992, Rothbard declared that "with Pat Buchanan as our leader, we shall break the clock of social democracy". The intention of Rockwell and Rothbard with this alliance was to revive an anti-war and anti-welfare right-wing movement and to oppose the neoconservative leadership of the Republican Party in the context of the end of the Cold War.

Three years later, Rothbard said Buchanan developed too much faith in economic planning and centralized state power, which eventually led paleolibertarians to withdraw their support for Buchanan. In addition to Buchanan's economic nationalism, Paul Gottfried later complained of a lack of funding, infighting, media hostility or blackouts, and vilification as "racists" and "anti-Semites". The paleolibertarian strategy did not produce practical results and generated little external sympathy. The John Randolph Club was disbanded in 1995 due to incompatibility between the libertarian and conservative factions.

Rothbard died in 1995. Rockwell asserted in 1999 that, with Rothbard's death, paleolibertarian organizing had ended. In 2007, Rockwell stated that he no longer used the term "paleolibertarian" because it was distorted by its past association with the term paleoconservative as "some kind of socially conservative libertarian", something that "was not the point at all" of paleolibertarianism, and that all libertarians should be "happy with the term libertarian."

== Influence ==
During the 2016 Republican Party presidential primaries and the campaign for the 2016 United States presidential election, several figures active in 1990s paleolibertarianism expressed sympathy for the messages of then-candidate Donald Trump. Lew Rockwell was sympathetic to Trump's 2016 presidential campaign because of his message against the Republican and Democratic Party establishments, as was Rothbardian Justin Raimondo, who voted for Trump based on foreign policy. In a 2016 pre-election debate with Reason editor Nick Gillespie, Austrian School anarcho-capitalist economist Walter Block advised libertarians living in battleground states to support Trump rather than cast their votes for Libertarian Party nominee Gary Johnson, citing the Trump campaign's foreign policy.

Following the 2022 Libertarian National Convention, the Mises Caucus, a paleolibertarian faction, became the dominant faction on the Libertarian National Committee.

== Notable proponents and organizations ==
- Mark Meechan, also known as Count Dankula, Scottish comedian and YouTuber
- Javier Milei, President of Argentina
- Ron Paul, American physician, author, and former United States Representative.
- Mises Caucus, faction within the American Libertarian Party
- Mises Institute, founded by Rockwell to advance Paleolibertarian and Austrian economic views.
- Stefan Molyneux, Canadian anarcho-capitalist podcaster, and a former associate of Rockwell.
- Gary North, American economist and Christian Reconstructionist.
- Hans-Hermann Hoppe, German economist, anarcho-capitalist, and cultural conservative.
- Property and Freedom Society, an organization for right-libertarians founded and led by Hoppe.
- Justin Raimondo, anti-war activist.
- Lew Rockwell, associate of Rothbard, advocate of secession, and founder of the Mises Institute.
- Murray Rothbard, American anarcho-capitalist and Austrian economist.
- R.J. Rushdoony, Armenian-American Calvinist minister, reconstructionist, and advocate of Christian libertarianism.
- Jeffrey Tucker, member of the Mises Institute and advocate of Bitcoin.
- Janusz Korwin-Mikke, Polish politician, founding member of Real Politics Union and Confederation Liberty and Independence.
- Paulo Kogos, Brazilian YouTuber

== See also ==
- Alt-lite
- Austrian School
- Conservative liberalism
- Criticism of democracy
- Dark Enlightenment
- Hans Hermann Hoppe
- Libertarian authoritarianism
- Libertarian conservatism
- Libertarian perspectives on immigration
- National conservatism
- National-anarchism
- Nativism (politics)
- Outline of libertarianism
- Paleoconservatism
- Party of Free Citizens
- Radical right (United States)
- Real Politics Union
- Right-libertarianism
- Right-wing populism
