= Non-aggression principle =

Core concept in libertarianism

The non-aggression principle (Note: Also called the non-aggression axiom, the non-coercion principle, the non-initiation of force and the zero-aggression principle.) (NAP) is a concept in which "aggression"—defined as initiating or threatening any forceful interference with an individual, their property (Note: Property is defined in this context as both personal possessions and private property.) or their agreements (contracts)—is illegitimate and should be prohibited. Interpretations of the NAP vary, particularly concerning issues like intellectual property, force, and abortion.

Like the Golden Rule, the Non-Aggression Principle follows an ethics of reciprocity, in the sense that whether a person's action is permissible depends upon the preceding actions of others.

The non-aggression principle is considered by some to be a, or even the, defining principle of libertarianism. It is a common principle among right-libertarians of both minarchist and anarcho-capitalist beliefs.

== History ==
The non-aggression principle has existed in various forms. A number of authors have created their own formulation of the harm principle which NAP supporters argue as a form of non-aggression principle as shown in the table below.

Historical formulations of the non-aggression principle
Year	Author	Formulation
1689	John Locke	Locke states: "Being all equal and independent, no one ought to harm another in his life, health, liberty, or possessions."
1819	Thomas Jefferson	In a letter to Isaac Tiffany, Jefferson argues: "Rightful liberty is unobstructed action according to our will within limits drawn around us by the equal rights of others. I do not add 'within the limits of the law', because law is often but the tyrant's will, and always so when it violates the rights of the individual. [...] No man has a natural right to commit aggression on the equal rights of another, and this is all from which the laws ought to restrain him."
1851	Herbert Spencer	Spencer formulates the following: "Every man is free to do that which he wills, provided he infringes not the equal freedom of any other man."
1859	John Stuart Mill	In his book On Liberty, Mill states that "the only purpose for which power can be rightfully exercised over any member of a civilized community, against his will, is to prevent harm to others."
1923	Albert Jay Nock	In the second chapter of his book Our Enemy, the State, Nock refers to the legendary king Pausole, who stated only two laws, namely "hurt no man" and "then do as you please."
1961	Ayn Rand	In an essay called "Man's Rights" in the book The Virtue of Selfishness, she formulated: "The precondition of a civilized society is the barring of physical force from social relationships. [...] In a civilized society, force may be used only in retaliation and only against those who initiate its use."
1963	Murray Rothbard	In "War, Peace, and the State" (1963) which appeared in Egalitarianism as a Revolt Against Nature and Other Essays, Rothbard states: "No one may threaten or commit violence ('aggress') against another man's person or property. Violence may be employed only against the man who commits such violence; that is, only defensively against the aggressive violence of another. In short, no violence may be employed against a nonaggressor. Here is the fundamental rule from which can be deduced the entire corpus of libertarian theory."

== Justifications ==
The principle has been derived through various philosophical approaches, including:

- Spirituality: The historical pedigree of the Non-Aggression Principle includes religious roots such as Taoism (as seen in sayings attributed to the sage Lao Tzu), Jain Buddhism (ahimsa), and Christianity (God's gift of free will). Such religions see ideas along the lines of the NAP as a spiritual duty or way of being associated with the will of the divine or the path of right conduct, above and beyond mere worldly concerns.
- Consequentialism: some advocates base the non-aggression principle on rule utilitarianism or rule egoism. These approaches hold that though violations of the non-aggression principle cannot be claimed to be objectively immoral, adherence to it almost always leads to the best possible results, and so it should be accepted as a moral rule. These scholars include David D. Friedman, Ludwig von Mises, and Friedrich Hayek.
- Objectivism: Ayn Rand rejected natural or inborn rights theories as well as supernatural claims and instead proposed a philosophy based on "observable reality" along with a corresponding ethics based on the "factual requirements" of human life in a social context. She stressed that the political principle of non-aggression is not a primary and that it only has validity as a consequence of a more fundamental philosophy. For this reason, many of her conclusions differ from others who hold the NAP as an axiom or arrived at it differently. She proposed that man survives by identifying and using concepts in his rational mind since "no sensations, percepts, urges or instincts can do it; only a mind can". She wrote, "since reason is man's basic means of survival, that which is proper to the life of a rational being is the good; that which negates, opposes or destroys it [i.e. initiatory force or fraud] is the evil."
- Argumentation ethics: some modern propertarian/right-libertarian thinkers ground the non-aggression principle by an appeal to the necessary praxeological presuppositions of any ethical discourse, an argument pioneered by anarcho-capitalist scholar Hans Hermann Hoppe. They claim that the act of arguing for the initiation of aggression, as defined by the non-aggression principle, is contradictory. Among its advocates are Stephan Kinsella and Murray Rothbard.
- Estoppel: Stephan Kinsella believes that the legal concept of estoppel implies and justifies the non-aggression principle.

== Definitional issues ==
=== Abortion ===
Propertarians/Right-libertarians who are pro-life and pro-choice both justify their position on NAP grounds. One question to determine whether or not abortion is consistent with the NAP is at what stage of development a fertilized human egg cell can be considered a human being with the status and rights attributed to personhood. Some supporters of the NAP argue this occurs at the moment of conception while others argue that since the fetus lacks sentience until a certain stage of development, it does not qualify as a human being and may be considered property of the mother. On the other hand, opponents of abortion state that sentience is not a qualifying factor. They refer to the animal rights discussion and point out the argument from marginal cases that concludes the NAP also applies to non-sentient (i.e. mentally handicapped) humans.

Another question is whether an unwelcome fetus should be considered to be an unauthorized trespasser in its mother's body. The non-aggression principle does not protect trespassers from the owners of the property on which they are trespassing.

Objectivist philosopher Leonard Peikoff has argued that a fetus has no right to life inside the womb because it is not an "independently existing, biologically formed organism, let alone a person". Pro-choice propertarian/right-libertarian Murray Rothbard held the same stance, maintaining that abortion is justified at any time during pregnancy if the fetus is no longer welcome inside its mother. Similarly, other pro-choice supporters base their argument on criminal trespass. In that case, they claim that the NAP is not violated when the fetus is forcibly removed, with deadly force if need be, from the mother's body, just as the NAP is not violated when an owner removes from the owner's property an unwanted visitor who is not willing to leave voluntarily. Libertarian theorist Walter Block follows this line of argument with his theory of evictionism, but he makes a distinction between evicting the fetus prematurely so that it dies and actively killing it. On the other hand, the theory of departurism permits only the non-lethal eviction of the trespassing fetus during a normal pregnancy.

Pro-life libertarians such as Libertarians for Life argue that because the parents were actively involved in creating a new human life and that life has not consented to their own existence, that life is in the womb by necessity and no parasitism or trespassing in the form of legal necessity is involved. They state that as the parents are responsible for that life's position, the NAP would be violated when that life is killed with abortive techniques.

=== Intellectual property rights ===
The NAP is applicable to any unauthorized actions towards a person's physical property. Supporters of the NAP disagree on whether it should apply to intellectual property rights as well as physical property rights. Some argue that because intellectual concepts are non-rivalrous, intellectual property rights are unnecessary while others argue that intellectual property rights are as valid and important as physical ones.

=== Force and interventions ===
Although the NAP is meant to guarantee an individual's sovereignty, propertarians/right-libertarians greatly differ on the conditions under which the NAP applies. Especially unsolicited intervention by others, either to prevent society from being harmed by the individual's actions or to prevent an incompetent individual from being harmed by his own actions or inactions, is an important issue. The debate centers on topics such as the age of consent for children, intervention counseling (i.e. for addicted persons, or in case of domestic violence), involuntary commitment and involuntary treatment with regards to mental illness, medical assistance (i.e. prolonged life support vs euthanasia in general and for the senile or comatose in particular), human organ trade, state paternalism (including economic interventionism) and foreign intervention by states. Other discussion topics on whether intervention is in line with the NAP include nuclear weapons proliferation, human trafficking and immigration.

Objectivist author Ronald Merill criticizes the anarcho-capitalist view of force. He states that the use of force is subjective, saying: "There's no objective basis for controlling the use of force. Your belief that you're using force to protect yourself is just an opinion; what if it is my opinion that you are violating my rights?"

=== Pollution ===
Prominent propertarian/right-libertarian thinkers such as Murray Rothbard considered pollution an act of aggression, mostly focusing on air pollution, though in absolute terms light pollution, sound, and anything that crosses a boundary into someone's property or person can constitute aggression. In order to avoid having mere existence violate the non-aggression principle, Rothbard, Nozick, and others proposed less strict positions. Nozick suggested that boundary-crossing is permissible up to a certain range as long as it is socially beneficial and compensation is paid for it. Rothbard suggested that a causal connection of objective harm needs to be demonstrated beyond reasonable doubt before prohibiting pollution. These approaches appear to contradict the non-aggression principle by enabling a permissible amount of harm.

=== States ===
Some propertarians/right-libertarians justify the existence of a minimal state on the grounds that anarcho-capitalism implies that the non-aggression principle is optional because the enforcement of laws is open to competition.

Anarcho-capitalists usually respond to this argument that this presumed outcome of what they call "coercive competition" (e.g., private military companies or private defense agencies that enforce local law) is not likely because of the very high cost, in lives and economically, of war. They claim that war drains those involved and leaves non-combatant parties as the most powerful, economically and militarily, ready to take over. Therefore, anarcho-capitalists claim that in practice, and in more advanced societies with large institutions that have a responsibility to protect their vested interests, disputes are most likely to be settled peacefully. Anarcho-capitalists also point out that a state monopoly of law enforcement does not necessarily make NAP present throughout society as corruption and corporatism, as well as lobby group clientelism in democracies, favor only certain people or organizations. Anarcho-capitalists aligned with the Rothbardian philosophy generally contend that the state violates the non-aggression principle by its very nature because, it is argued, governments necessarily use force against those who have not stolen private property, vandalized private property, assaulted anyone, or committed fraud.

=== Taxation ===
Some proponents of the NAP see taxes as a violation of the NAP, while critics of the NAP argue that because of the free-rider problem in case security is a public good, enough funds would not be obtainable by voluntary means to protect individuals from aggression of a greater severity. Geolibertarians, who following the classical economists and Georgists adhere to the Lockean labor theory of property, argue that private ownership of land violates the NAP, and therefore land value taxation is fully compatible with the NAP.

Anarcho-capitalists argue that the protection of individuals against aggression is self-sustaining like any other valuable service, and that it can be supplied without coercion by the free market much more effectively and efficiently than by a government monopoly. Their approach, based on proportionality in justice and damage compensation, argues that full restitution is compatible with both retributivism and a utilitarian degree of deterrence while consistently maintaining NAP in a society. They extend their argument to all public goods and services traditionally funded through taxation, like security offered by dikes.

== Support ==
Supporters of the NAP often appeal to it in order to argue for the immorality of theft, vandalism, sexual assault, assault, and fraud. Compared to nonviolence, the non-aggression principle does not preclude violence used in self-defense or defense of others. Many supporters argue that NAP opposes such policies as victimless crime laws, taxation, and military drafts. The NAP is the foundation of propertarian/right-libertarian philosophy.

== Criticism ==
The NAP faces two kinds of criticism: the first holds that the principle is immoral, and the second argues that it is impossible to apply consistently in practice; respectively, consequentialist or deontological criticisms, and inconsistency criticisms. Propertarian/Right-libertarian academic philosophers have noted the implausible results consistently applying the principle yields: for example, Professor Matt Zwolinski notes that, because pollution necessarily violates the NAP by encroaching (even if slightly) on other people's property, consistently applying the NAP would prohibit driving, starting a fire, and other activities necessary to the maintenance of industrial society.

The NAP also faces definitional issues regarding what is understood as forceful interference and property, and under which conditions it applies. The NAP has been criticized as circular reasoning and a rhetorical obfuscation of the coercive nature of propertarian/right-libertarian property law enforcement because the principle redefines aggression in their own terms.

Philosopher Jason Brennan has written a critique citing Walter Block's definition of the non-aggression principle, arguing that the words alone do not seem to provide libertarians with a clear argument for freedom:

The difference between libertarians and non-libertarians is not about whether aggression is permissible. Instead, it’s about what counts as aggression, or about just who has a right to what.

Brennan argued that the non-aggression principle is a simple moral slogan and therefore difficult to persuade people. He pointed out that this principle can be interpreted in various ways depending on how the concepts of ownership and rights implied in it are defined, and that it is actually used in various ways among people in reality. Therefore, he argued that it is difficult to function as a clear guideline or implementation strategy for realizing an ideal liberty society.

=== Moral criticism ===
==== Positive rights ====
Critics argue that the non-aggression principle is not ethical because it opposes the initiation of force even when they would consider the results of such initiation to be morally superior to the alternatives that they have identified. In arguing against the NAP, philosopher Matt Zwolinski has proposed the following scenario: "Suppose that by imposing a very, very small tax on billionaires, I could provide life-saving vaccination for tens of thousands of desperately poor children. Even if we grant that taxation is aggression, and that aggression is generally wrong, is it really so obvious that the relatively minor aggression involved in these examples is wrong, given the tremendous benefit it produces?"

==== Incompatibility with driving and other civilizational necessities ====
Zwolinski also notes that the NAP is incompatible with any practice that produces any pollution, because pollution encroaches on the property rights of others. Therefore, the NAP prohibits both driving and starting fires. Citing David D. Friedman, Zwolinski notes that the NAP is unable to place a sensible limitation on risk-creating behavior, arguing:

Of course, almost everything we do imposes some risk of harm on innocent persons. We run this risk when we drive on the highway (what if we suffer a heart attack, or become distracted), or when we fly airplanes over populated areas. Most of us think that some of these risks are justifiable, while others are not, and that the difference between them has something to do with the size and likelihood of the risked harm, the importance of the risky activity, and the availability and cost of less risky activities. But considerations like this carry zero weight in the NAP's absolute prohibition on aggression. That principle seems compatible with only two possible rules: either all risks are permissible (because they are not really aggression until they actually result in a harm), or none are (because they are). And neither of these seems sensible.

Some supporters argue that no one initiates force if their only option for self-defense is to use force against a greater number of people as long as they were not responsible for being in the position they are in. Murray Rothbard's and Walter Block's formulations of NAP avoid these objections by either specifying that the NAP applies only to a civilized context (and not "lifeboat situations") or that it applies only to legal rights (as opposed to general morality). Thus a starving man may, in consonance with general morality, break into a hunting cabin and steal food, but nevertheless he is aggressing, i.e., violating the NAP, and (by most rectification theories) should pay compensation. Critics argue that the legal rights approach might allow people who can afford to pay a sufficiently large amount of compensation to get away with murder. They point out that local law may vary from proportional compensation to capital punishment to no compensation at all.

==== Non-physical aggression ====
Other critics state that the NAP is unethical because it does not provide for the violent prohibition of, and thereby supposedly legitimizes, several forms of aggression that do not involve intrusion on property rights such as verbal sexual harassment, defamation, boycotting, noninvasive striking etc. If a victim thus provoked would turn to physical violence, they would be labeled an aggressor according to the NAP. However, supporters of the NAP state that boycotting and defamation both constitute freedoms of speech and that boycotting, noninvasive striking and noninvasive discrimination all constitute freedoms of association and that both freedoms of association and of speech are nonaggressive. Supporters also point out that prohibiting physical retaliation against an action is not itself condonement of said action, and that generally there are other, nonphysical means by which one can combat social ills (e.g., discrimination) that do not violate the NAP. Some supporters also state that while most of the time individuals choose voluntarily to engage in situations that may cause some degree of mental battering, this mental battering begins to constitute unauthorized physical overload of the senses (i.e., eardrum and retina) when it cannot be avoided and that the NAP at that point does apply.

Many supporters consider verbal and written threats of imminent physical violence sufficient justification for a defensive response in a physical manner. Those threats would then constitute a legitimate limit to permissible speech. Because freedom of association entails the right of owners to choose who is permitted to enter or remain on their premises, legitimate property owners may also impose limitation on speech. The owner of a theatre wishing to avoid a stampede may prohibit those on her property from calling 'fire!' without just cause. However, the owner of a bank may not prohibit anyone from urging the general public to a bank run, except insofar as this occurs on the property of said owner.

In a 1948 interview with Donald H. Kirkley for the Library of Congress, H. L. Mencken, a writer who influenced many libertarians, puts an ethical limit on the freedom of speech:

I believe there is a limit beyond which free speech cannot go, but it's a limit that's very seldom mentioned. It's the point where free speech begins to collide with the right to privacy. I do not think there are any other conditions to free speech. I've got a right to say and believe anything I please, but I have not got a right to press it on anybody else. [...] Nobody's got a right to be a nuisance to his neighbors.

Supporters also consider physical threats of imminent physical violence (e.g. pointing a firearm at innocent people, or stocking up nuclear weapons that cannot be used discriminately against specific individual aggressors) sufficient justification for a defensive response in a physical manner. Those threats would then constitute a legitimate limit to permissible action.

=== Inconsistency criticisms ===
==== Natural resources and environmental pollution ====
Critics argue it is not possible to uphold NAP when protecting the environment as most pollution can never be traced back to the party that caused it. They therefore claim that only general broad government regulations will be able to protect the environment. Supporters cite the theoretical "tragedy of the commons" and argue that free-market environmentalism will be much more effective in conserving nature. Political theorist Hillel Steiner emphasizes that all things made come from natural resources and that the validity of any rights to those made things depends on the validity of the rights to the natural resources. If land was stolen then anyone buying produce from that land would not be the legitimate owner of the goods. Also, if natural resources cannot be privately owned but are, and always will be, the property of all of mankind then NAP would be violated if such a resource would be used without everybody's consent (see the Lockean proviso and free-market anarchism). Libertarian philosopher Roderick Long suggests that, as natural resources are required not only for the production of goods but for the production of the human body as well, the very concept of self-ownership can only exist if the land itself is privately owned.

==== Relative rather than absolute concept ====
Consequentialist libertarian David D. Friedman, who believes that the NAP should be understood as a relative rather than absolute principle, defends his view by using a sorites argument. Friedman begins by stating what he considers obvious: a neighbor aiming his flashlight at someone's property is not aggression, or if it is, it is only aggression in a trivial technical sense. However, aiming at the same property with a gigawatt laser is certainly aggression by any reasonable definition. Yet both flashlight and laser shine photons onto the property, so there must be some cutoff point of how many photons one is permitted to shine upon a property before it is considered aggression. However, the cutoff point cannot be found by deduction alone because of the sorites paradox, so the non-aggression principle is necessarily ambiguous. Friedman points out the difficulty of undertaking any activity that poses a certain amount of risk to third parties (e.g., flying) if the permission of thousands of people that might be affected by the activity is required.

== See also ==
- Ahimsa
- Harm principle
- Law of equal liberty
- Libertarian pledge
- Libertarian theories of law
- Negative liberty
- Nonviolent resistance
- Primum non nocere
- Wiccan Rede
- Pacifism
- Silver Rule
- Taxation is theft
- Victimless crime
- Voluntaryism
