= Self-ownership =

Concept of property in one's own person

Self-ownership, also known as sovereignty of the individual or individual sovereignty, is the concept of property in one's own person, expressed as the moral or natural right of a person to have bodily integrity and be the exclusive controller of one's own body and life. Self-ownership is a central idea in several political philosophies that emphasize individualism, such as libertarianism, liberalism, and anarchism.

== Definitional issues ==
=== The self ===
American libertarian socialist Stephen Pearl Andrews frequently discussed the sovereignty of the individual in his writings. In The Science of Society, he says that Protestantism, democracy and socialism are "three partial announcements of one generic principle" which is "the sovereignty of the individual". Andrews considered the sovereignty of the individual to be "the basis of harmonious intercourse amongst equals, precisely as the equal Sovereignty of States is the basis of harmonious intercourse between nations mutually recognizing their independence of each other."

Discussion of the boundary of self with respect to ownership and responsibility has been explored by legal scholar Meir Dan-Cohen in his essays on The Value of Ownership and Responsibility and the Boundaries of the Self. The emphasis of this work illuminates the phenomenology of ownership and our common usage of personal pronouns to apply to both body and property – this serves as the folk basis for legal conceptions and debates about responsibility and ownership. Another view holds that labor is alienable because it can be contracted out, thus alienating it from the self. In this view, the choice of a person to voluntarily sell oneself into slavery is also preserved by the principle of self-ownership.

=== Labour markets and private property ===
For anarcho-communist political philosopher L. Susan Brown: "Liberalism and anarchism are two political philosophies that are fundamentally concerned with individual freedom yet differ from one another in very distinct ways. Anarchism shares with liberalism a commitment to individual freedom while rejecting liberalism's competitive property relations". Scholar Ellen Meiksins Wood says that "there are doctrines of individualism that are opposed to Lockean individualism... and non-Lockean individualism may encompass socialism".

Right-libertarian conceptions of self-ownership extend the concept to include control of private property as part of the self. According to Gerald Cohen, "the libertarian principle of self-ownership says that each person enjoys, over herself and her powers, full and exclusive rights of control and use, and therefore owes no service or product to anyone else that she has not contracted to supply".

Philosopher Ian Shapiro says that labor markets affirm self-ownership because if self-ownership were not recognized, then people would not be allowed to sell the use of their productive capacities to others. He says that the individual sells the use of his productive capacity for a limited time and conditions but continues to own what he earns from selling the use of that capacity and the capacity itself, thereby retaining sovereignty over himself while contributing to economic efficiency. A common view within classical liberalism is that sovereign-minded individuals usually assert a right of private property external to the body, reasoning that if a person owns themselves, they own their actions, including those that create or improve resources, therefore they own their own labour and the fruits thereof.

In Human Action, Austrian School economist Ludwig von Mises argues that labor markets are the rational conclusion of self-ownership and argues that collective ownership of labor ignores differing values for the labor of individuals:

Of course, people believe that there is an essential difference between the tasks incumbent upon the comrades of the socialist commonwealth and those incumbent upon slaves or serfs. The slaves and serfs, they say, toiled for the benefit of an exploiting lord. But in a socialist system, the produce of labor goes to society of which the toiler himself is a part; here the worker works for himself, as it were. What this reasoning overlooks is that the identification of the individual comrades and the totality of all comrades with the collective entity pocketing the produce of all work is merely fictitious. Whether the ends which the community's officeholders are aiming at agreeing or disagreeing with the wishes and desires of the various comrades are of minor importance. The main thing is that the individual's contribution to the collective entity's wealth is not requited in the shape of wages determined by the market.

— Ludwig von Mises

Other scholars are critical of the idea of private property, specifically within anarchism. The anarchist Oscar Wilde said:

For the recognition of private property has really harmed Individualism, and obscured it, by confusing a man with what he possesses. It has led Individualism entirely astray. It has made gain, not growth its aim. So that man thought that the important thing was to have, and did not know that the important thing is to be. The true perfection of man lies, not in what man has, but in what man is... With the abolition of private property, then, we shall have true, beautiful, healthy Individualism. Nobody will waste his life in accumulating things, and the symbols for things. One will live. To live is the rarest thing in the world. Most people exist, that is all".

— Oscar Wilde

Within anarchism, the concept of wage slavery refers to a situation perceived as quasi-voluntary slavery, where a person's livelihood depends on wages, especially when the dependence is total and immediate. It is a negatively connoted term used to draw an analogy between slavery and wage labor by focusing on similarities between owning and renting a person. The term "wage slavery" has been used to criticize economic exploitation and social stratification, with the former seen primarily as unequal bargaining power between labor and capital (particularly when workers are paid comparatively low wages, e.g. in sweatshops) and the latter as a lack of workers' self-management, fulfilling job choices and leisure in an economy. With the advent of the Industrial Revolution, thinkers such as Pierre-Joseph Proudhon and Karl Marx elaborated the comparison between wage labor and slavery in the context of a critique of societal property not intended for active personal use while Luddites emphasized the dehumanization brought about by machines. Emma Goldman famously denounced "wage slavery" by saying: "The only difference is that you are hired slaves instead of block slaves".

Within left-libertarianism, scholars such as Hillel Steiner, Peter Vallentyne, Philippe Van Parijs, Michael Otsuka and David Ellerman root an economic egalitarianism in the classical liberal concepts of self-ownership and land appropriation, combined with geoist or physiocratic views regarding the ownership of land and natural resources (e.g. those of John Locke and Henry George). Left-libertarians "maintain that the world's natural resources were initially unowned or belonged equally to all, and it is illegitimate for anyone to claim exclusive private ownership of these resources to the detriment of others. Such private appropriation is legitimate only if everyone can appropriate an equal amount, or if those who appropriate more are taxed to compensate those who are thereby excluded from what was once common property". This position is articulated in contrast to the position of other libertarians who argue for a right to appropriate parts of the external world based on sufficient use, even if this homesteading yields unequal results. Some left-libertarians of the Steiner–Vallentyne type support some form of income redistribution on the grounds of a claim by each individual to be entitled to an equal share of natural resources.

== History ==
John Locke wrote in his Two Treatises on Government that "every man has a Property in his own Person". Libertarian philosopher Robert Nozick interprets Locke as saying that the individual "has a right to decide what would become of himself and what he would do, and as having a right to reap the benefits of what he did". Josiah Warren was the first who wrote about the "sovereignty of the individual".

In the twentieth century, self-ownership became a foundational axiom of modern libertarian political philosophy. Murray Rothbard, in The Ethics of Liberty (1982), argued that each person has exclusive ownership of his or her own body and that this right is the basis for both the non-aggression principle and the legitimacy of private property acquired through original appropriation or voluntary transfer. Robert Nozick's early Anarchy, State, and Utopia (1974) had already treated Lockean self-ownership as central to rights-based liberalism.

== See also ==
- Castle doctrine
- Civil libertarianism
- Civil liberties
- Cognitive liberty
- Counter-economics
- Empowerment
- Free will
- Freedom of speech
- Freedom of thought
- Harm principle
- Individualist anarchism
- Law of equal liberty
- Negative liberty
- Mind–body dualism
- Non-aggression principle
- Perpetual traveler
- Public-order crime
- Redemption movement
- Right to die
- Right to personal identity
- Self-determination
- Sovereign citizen movement
- Sumptuary law
- Victimless crime

== Bibliography ==
- Cohen, G. A. (1995). Self-Ownership, Freedom, and Equality. Cambridge University Press.
- Ellerman, David P. (1992). Property and Contract in Economics: The Case for Economic Democracy (PDF). Cambridge, MA: Blackwell. ISBN 978-1557863096.
- Goldman, Emma (2003). Falk, Candace; et al. (eds.). Emma Goldman: A Documentary History of the American Years, Volume I: Made for America, 1890–1901. Berkeley & Los Angeles, CA: University of California Press. ISBN 978-0520086708.
- Hallgrimsdottir, Helga Kristin; Benoit, Cecilia (2007). "From Wage Slaves to Wage Workers: Cultural Opportunity Structures and the Evolution of the Wage Demands of the Knights of Labor and the American Federation of Labor, 1880–1900". Social Forces. 85 (3): 1393–1411. doi:10.1353/sof.2007.0037. JSTOR 4494978. S2CID 154551793.
- Marx, Karl (1969) [1863]. Theories of Surplus Value. Moscow: Progress Publishers.
- Proudhon, Pierre-Joseph (1890) [1840]. What Is Property? or, An Inquiry into the Principle of Right and of Government. New York: Humboldt Publishing.
- Sandel, Michael J. (1996). Democracy's Discontent: America in Search of a Public Philosophy. Cambridge, MA: Belknap Press. ISBN 978-0674197442.
