= Night-watchman state =

Government with minimal intervention

A night-watchman state, also referred to as a minimal state, minarchy or minarchism, whose proponents are known as minarchists, is a model of a state that is limited and minimal, whose functions depend on libertarian theory. Right-libertarians support it only as an enforcer of the non-aggression principle by providing citizens with the military, the police, and courts, thereby protecting them from aggression, theft, breach of contract and fraud, and enforcing property laws.

In the United States, this form of government is mainly associated with libertarian and objectivist political philosophy. In other countries, minarchism is also advocated by some non-anarchist libertarian socialists and other left-libertarians. A night-watchman state has also been popularized by Robert Nozick in Anarchy, State, and Utopia (1974). The United Kingdom in the 19th century has been described by historian Charles Townshend as a standard-bearer for this form of government.

== Origin ==
As a term, night-watchman state (German: Nachtwächterstaat) was coined by German socialist Ferdinand Lassalle in an 1862 speech in Berlin wherein he criticized the bourgeois-liberal limited government state, comparing it to a nightwatchman. The phrase quickly caught on as a description of capitalist government, even as liberalism began to mean a more involved state, or a state with a larger sphere of responsibility. Ludwig von Mises later opined that Lassalle tried to make limited government look ridiculous, but it was no more ridiculous than governments that concerned themselves with "the preparation of sauerkraut, with the manufacture of trouser buttons, or with the publication of newspapers".

Proponents of the night-watchman state are minarchists, a portmanteau of minimum and -archy. Arche (/ˈɑːrki/; Ancient Greek: ἀρχή) is a Greek word which came to mean "first place, power", "method of government", "empire, realm", "authorities" (in plural: ἀρχαί), or "command". The term minarchist was coined by Samuel Edward Konkin III in 1980.

== Philosophy ==
Right-libertarian minarchists generally justify the state as a logical consequence of the non-aggression principle. They argue that anarcho-capitalism is impractical because it is not sufficient to enforce the non-aggression principle, as the enforcement of laws under anarchy would be open to competition. Another common objection to anarchism is that private defense and court firms would tend to represent the interests of those who pay them enough.

Left-libertarian minarchists justify the state as a temporary measure on the grounds that social safety will net benefit the working class. Some anarchists, such as Noam Chomsky, are in agreement with social democrats on the importance of welfare measures, but prefer using non-state methods. Left-libertarians such as Peter Hain are decentralists who do not advocate abolishing the state, but do wish to limit and devolve state power, stipulating that any measures favoring the wealthy be prioritized for repeal before those which benefit the poor.

Some minarchists argue that a state is inevitable because anarchy is futile. Robert Nozick, who publicized the idea of a minimal state in Anarchy, State, and Utopia (1974), argued that a night-watchman state provides a framework that allows for any political system that respects fundamental individual rights and therefore morally justifies the existence of a state. Nozick believed minarchy will arise as a consequence of anarcho-capitalism, as a private defense agency (PDA) will eventually become a monopoly and function as a sort of small state within an anarcho-capitalist system.

== See also ==
- Anarchism and anarcho-capitalism
- Anarcho-capitalism and minarchism
- Big government
- Classical liberalism
- Constitutional liberalism
- Debates within libertarianism
- Objectivist movement
- Objectivism and libertarianism
- Property is theft!
- Rahn curve
- Small government
- Taxation as theft
- Voluntaryism
- Watchman (law enforcement)
