= Christian libertarianism =

Synthesis of Christian beliefs with libertarian thought

Christian libertarianism is an American political and theological tradition synthesizing Christian doctrine with libertarianism, focusing on free will, human nature, and God-given inalienable rights.

As with some other forms of libertarianism, Christian libertarianism holds that what is prohibited by law should be limited to various forms of assault, theft and fraud.

== Definition ==
According to Andrew Sandlin, an American theologian and author, Christian libertarianism is the view that mature individuals are permitted maximum freedom under God's law.

== History ==
=== Historical antecedents ===
Christian libertarianism emerged as a political and theological tradition in the United States during the 20th century, although its proponents have traced its underlying ideas to earlier Christian doctrines and practices on political freedom. These included interpretations of the ministry of Jesus and early Christianity that emphasized moral responsibility, nonviolence, voluntary religious association, and use of persuasion over coercion. Some contemporary Christian libertarian writers argue these principles were particularly evident in early Christian communities, which were often politically independent and resisted the use of such power to promote Christianity. Such interpretations also identified the adoption of Christianity as the Roman Empire’s state religion and what is now cesaropapism as a departure from early Christianity’s voluntary nature.

Other proponents identified antecedents in the Reformation, development of the freedom of religion, and natural rights. In the United States, 20th century Christian libertarian writers frequently referred to the faith of Protestant clergy in the Thirteen Colonies and Founding Fathers as evidence of a historical relationship between Christianity and civil liberty. They argued the United States Declaration of Independence’s recognition of providentially endowed rights was a conception of freedom grounded in natural law and inherent human dignity.

Nevertheless, these antecedents weren’t an uninterrupted historical movement, with the explicit development of Christian libertarianism as a distinct subject of political and theological discussion being comparatively recent among several related but institutionally separate organizations, publications, and intellectual traditions.

=== Emergence (1935–1950) ===
Organized Christian libertarianism developed during the Great Depression in the United States, particularly in opposition to the expansion of the federal government under the New Deal and the growth of the Social Gospel within Protestantism. The Social Gospel associated Christian responsibility with addressing socioeconomic issues through institutional reform and, in some cases, market intervention. Christian libertarian advocates instead emphasized moral responsibility, voluntary charity, private property, and moral and social improvement primarily coming from individual conviction and voluntary cooperation.

An important early organization was Spiritual Mobilization, founded in Chicago in the spring of 1935 by Congregationalist minister James W. Fifield Jr., Carleton College president Donald J. Cowling, and professor William Hocking. They sought to promote what they argued was the Christian basis for individualism and limited government, while opposing what its founders regarded as the societal and religious growth of collectivism. Its activities initially concentrated on encouraging religious and community leaders to recognize the relationship between Christian principles and individual liberty.

Spiritual Mobilization’s influence expanded in the late 1940s with its periodical Faith and Freedom, first published in December 1949. It advocated religious justifications for limited government and individualism, arguing Christianity was a moral basis for political freedom.

In May 1950, the Christian Freedom Foundation (CFF) was established by businessman J. Howard Pew, who financed the organization through donated stock of his company, Sun Oil. CFF was headed by Howard E. Kershner, a retired Quakerbusinessman, who also edited its principal publication, Christian Economics. The publication was primarily intended to educate Protestant ministers about the free-market and Christian arguments for individual economic freedom. It featured contributions from economists and writers associated with classical liberalism and emerging libertarians, including Ludwig von Mises and F. A. Hayek.

Another important publication was The Freeman, first published in 1950. Although not exclusively a Christian libertarian publication, it was a platform for writers who connected individualism and classically liberal economics with Christian values. Its contributors included Christian ministers and libertarian intellectuals.

=== Development during the 1950s ===
During the 1950s, Christian libertarianism developed became more politically and intellectually recognizable within American conservatism. Its proponents sought to establish a Christian justification for individualism, the free market economics, and limited government, while opposing to welfare state expansion, socialism, and economic and political centralization. Christian libertarians also regarded communism as a threat to the freedom of religion, self-ownership, and moral basis for a free society.

Spiritual Mobilization and the Christian Freedom Foundation shared similar goals but differed in institutional approach. Spiritual Mobilization concentrated on disseminating its religious philosophy of individual liberty through Faith and Freedom, educational activities, and outreach to religious and community leaders. The Christian Freedom Foundation, meanwhile, emphasized the economic implications of Christian doctrine through Christian Economics, which was freely distributed to ministers. Haddigan reports that its circulation approached 200,000 at its peak.

Christian libertarian writers also criticized the increasingly political involvement of Protestant organizations, particularly the National Council of Churches, whose advocacy of social reform they associated with the Social Gospel and big government. They generally countered that the Church should limit itself to focusing on evangelism, renewing faith, and encouraging voluntary moral conduct.

Their interpretation of American history was also used to justify their positions, frequently presenting the American Revolution as an expression of Christian natural law. They argued the recognition of providentially endowed individual rights as distinctive of constitutionalism in the United States, and sought to persuade clergy and other influential members of society of this view.

Edmund A. Opitz, a Congregationalist minister, was an important advocate for the movement who joined Spiritual Mobilization in 1951 before moving to the Foundation for Economic Education in 1955. There, he continued publishing work on the Christian basis of individualism and relation between Christianity and economic freedom. Other Christian libertarian figures included Russell J. Clinchy and Joseph R. Peden.

The movement also developed through debates over relations between the Christian right and libertarianism. Presbyterian minister Carl McIntire and organizations like the American Council of Christian Churches opposed the Social Gospel, defending individualism and freedom of conscience. Other contemporaries including the Christian Anti-Communism Crusade and Christian Crusade, also emphasized moral responsibility and opposed to collectivism. However, they were not necessarily systematic Christian libertarian movements, with their positions differing from more explicitly libertarian intellectuals.

Christian libertarians also disagreed over foreign policy, with some opposing interventionism against communist states, arguing extensive military commitments increased taxation, bureaucracy, and power of the federal government. Others however, supported stronger measures to contain communist expansion.

Although Christian libertarian organizations received substantial financing and had influential publications, their ability to nationally alter the views of Protestant clergy and public opinion was limited.

=== Relationship with the New Right (1960s–1970s) ===
During the 1960s, Christian libertarianism was increasingly associated with the tensions between the Old Right and emerging New Right. The establishment of the National Review in 1955 and prominence of Arizona senator Barry Goldwater’s 1964 presidential campaign reflected a transformation in American conservatism. Whereas libertarians in the Old Right often opposed the expansion of federal government, including through an interventionist defense policy, many on the New Right supported stronger federal involvement opposing communism and advancing conservative political goals.

A critical attempt to reconcile libertarian and traditionalist conservative positions came from Frank S. Meyer’s fusionism. In his 1960 essay Freedom, Tradition, Conservatism, Meyer argued that political freedom was necessary for individuals to pursue moral and religious truth. He maintained freedom and traditional morality were not inherently contradictory, since genuine virtue required voluntary choice rather than coercion.

Christian libertarian arguments also continued to appear in libertarian publications during the early 1970s. In July–August 1971, Christian libertarian writer Joseph R. Peden published Liberty: From Rand to Christ in Libertarian Forum, criticizing the influence of Ayn Rand’s Objectivism on libertarianism, instead arguing for renewed appreciation of Christian moral philosophy. Murray Rothbard, who edited the publication, subsequently defended the importance of Christian intellectual and ethical tradition as a foundation for political thought.

=== Later developments ===
Although organizations closely associated with Christian libertarianism’s initial development were prominent during the 1950s and early 1960s, the movement’s ideas continued to be promoted by individual writers and organizations concerned with the relationship between religious conviction and individualism. Edmund Opitz remained an important advocate through his work at the Foundation for Economic Education, serving for several decades and helping organize the Remnant, a fellowship of conservative and libertarian ministers. His writings continued to emphasize the compatibility of Christian morality, economic freedom, and limited government.

== Notable people ==
- Justin Amash (Orthodox)
- Nikolai Berdyaev (Orthodox)
- John Dalberg-Acton, 1st Baron Acton (Roman Catholic)
- James W. Fifield Jr. (Congregationalist)
- Jesus Huerta de Soto (Roman Catholic)
- Jörg Guido Hülsmann (Roman Catholic)
- Johannes Kaiser (Orthodox)
- Gary Johnson (Lutheran)
- John Locke (Anglican, Unitarian)
- Andrew Napolitano (Roman Catholic)
- Albert Jay Nock (Episcopalian)
- Rand Paul (Presbyterian)
- Ron Paul (Baptist)
- Lawrence Reed
- Norman Vincent Peale (Methodist, Reformed)
- Thomas Woods (Roman Catholic)
- Deirdre McCloskey (Episcopalian)

== See also ==
- Christian anarchism
- Christian democracy
- Christian ethics
- Christian existentialism
- Christian pacifism
- Christian socialism
- Christian views on poverty and wealth
- Christianity and politics
- Consistent life ethic
- Constantinian shift
- Cultural mandate
- Geolibertarianism
- Golden and Silver Rules
- Image of God
- Kingship and kingdom of God
- Libertarian Christianity
- Natural-rights libertarianism
- Non-aggression principle
- Original and ancestral sin
- Political ethics
- Political theology
- Religious views on capitalism
- Statolatry
- Two kingdoms doctrine
