= Libertarian Christianity =

Reformed Christian theology variant

Libertarian Christianity is a designation that encompasses a variety of people, ideologies, philosophies, etc., the commonality of which is that each of these claims some commitment to both libertarianism and Christianity. Libertarianism and Christianity, as societal entities, are each composed of a variety of factions, each of which claims some distinguishing features that make such faction more libertarian, or more Christian, than other factions operating under the same libertarian or Christian banner. Libertarian Christians are yet another faction within each of these two internally diverse superstructures. What makes libertarian Christianity unique is that people who claim to be libertarian Christians are people who either implicitly or explicitly claim to have found some kind of ideological bridge that makes libertarianism and Christianity compatible. Whether people who claim to be libertarian Christians have discovered an ideological bridge that is genuinely faithful to the fundamental tenets of both libertarianism and Christianity is inevitably a question whose answer determines whether the libertarian Christian's bridge is ideologically sound or is based on pure presumption and wishful thinking.

Because both libertarianism and Christianity, as societal entities, are composed of contentious ideological factions, ascertaining the fundamental tenets of libertarianism and Christianity, and thereby showing the fundamental tenets that the two hold in common, and thereby discovering reliable fundamental tenets of any ideologically reliable bridge between libertarianism and Christianity, may appear on its face to be a nearly impossible task. People who are rigorous in their commitment to libertarian Christianity overcome such difficulties by insisting on rational approaches to defining libertarianism, rational approaches to defining Christianity, and rational approaches to defining the intersection of these two superstructures, then taking a methodical approach to pursuing construction of the bridge. This has led some libertarian Christian scholars to contend two things: a) that Reformed Protestant Christianity is the most rational approach to Bible-based Christianity; and b) that Murray Rothbard's libertarianism is the most rationally rigorous approach to libertarianism. These scholars are even more specific. They contend that there is a specific kind of Reformed Protestantism that is simultaneously committed to the Reformed hermeneutics originally formulated by Luther, and to "classical apologetics". These scholars have built the bridge of compatibility between Christianity and libertarianism by starting with a seemingly small modification to the Reformed hermeneutic, and then by using that modestly modified hermeneutic to interpret the Bible in a way that yields jurisprudential principles that happen to be libertarian.

With this context established, it is evident that rigorously defined libertarian Christianity is a variant of Reformed Protestant political theology. Although some might claim this to be right-libertarianism, this rigorous approach to libertarian Christianity does not promote that characterization. This is because rigorous libertarian Christianity claims to defy this right-left paradigm by exposing left-libertarianism as not being libertarian at all. Rigorous libertarian Christians claim left-libertarianism is not libertarian because it lacks adequate commitment to the property rights of natural persons, such property rights being at the core of this rigorous approach to defining libertarianism. This rigorous form of libertarian Christianity is committed to the belief that all secular governments exist to protect the natural rights of individuals, and only to protect natural rights. It is also committed to the belief that natural rights are necessarily defined in terms of private property, at least in secular legal and political arenas.

This rigorous form of libertarian Christianity claims that there must be a rigorous distinction between what human laws apply to all people and what human laws do not. People with these commitments believe that human laws that do not apply to all people, but do lawfully apply to some people, are inherently contractual, where lawful contracts can only be lawfully entered voluntarily and consensually. They hold that the only human laws that apply to all people are those that, a) from a libertarian perspective, arise rationally out of the non-aggression principle, and b) from a biblical perspective, are rationally implicit in the bloodshed mandate in Genesis 9:6. By adhering to the validity of these principles, rigorous libertarian Christians believe that all people are called to voluntarily participate in organizations that prosecute those who damage other people through violation of the non-aggression principle. They also believe that such damage can arise exclusively either by violating contracts, or outside of any contract. They also believe that because the religion clauses (Establishment Clause and Free Exercise Clause) of the U.S. Constitution are theologically valid, there is a necessary distinction between what they call "secular social compacts" and "religious social compacts".

People who adhere to rigorously defined libertarian Christianity claim that their libertarianism is a formally voluntaryist legal and political philosophy that derives primarily from the text of the Bible. This does not mean that they are unwilling to interact with extra-biblical truth claims. It merely means that in their view, all truth is ultimately God's truth, and that all extra-biblical truth is ultimately consistent with biblical truth.

Despite their claim to be methodologically distinct from secular libertarians, non-rigorous libertarian Christians, and Christian libertarians, rigorous libertarian Christians readily acknowledge large areas of basic agreement with other types of libertarians in regard to legal and political concerns, and they readily work in concert with people from these other schools. More specifically, they make common cause with libertarians and market anarchists who generally espouse private property and natural rights. These include Rothbardian anarcho-capitalists, Nozickian minarchists, Hoppean paleolibertarians, and more mainstream libertarian Christians and Christian libertarians. Because rigorously defined libertarian Christianity is so different from these other factions with which it readily makes common cause, and because the ideologies supporting these other groups are generally defined elsewhere, the remainder of this article refers to rigorously defined libertarian Christianity merely as "libertarian Christianity".

== Hermeneutics ==
The core of the biblical hermeneutic used by libertarian Christians is essentially the same as the biblical hermeneutic established by Luther, and followed by Reformed Protestants up to the present. The first rule of this hermeneutic is that the Bible interprets itself. They base this belief on their beliefs that God is rational and does not contradict himself, that the Bible is God's word, and that the Bible is therefore internally consistent and non-contradictory. This first rule of this hermeneutic is generally known as the "analogy of faith", but this use of that expression should not be confused with the definitions of analogy of faith used by other Christian sects.

The second rule of this hermeneutic is what Luther called the sensus literalis. This simply means that the Bible should be interpreted in its literal sense. In the past, critics have sometimes used this rule as evidence that the Bible is not the rational book that that rule claims it is. They have done this, for example, by insisting on taking metaphors literally to censure the Bible as absurd. In John 10:9, Jesus says, "I am the door" (King James Version). The critics claim that is absurd because Jesus cannot be human and a door at the same time. Defenders of the Reformed hermeneutic respond by saying that such critics are the ones who are absurd, because they have failed to do genre analysis of the text before leaping to their conclusion. Genre analysis leads to the conclusion that Jesus’ statement in John 10:9 is metaphorical, and that the sensus literalis demands that it be understood to be metaphorical before one makes any judgments about what it means. So genre analysis is an extremely important precursor to understanding what the text actually means.

The third and last of the primary principles of interpretation of the Reformed hermeneutic is what is called the "grammatico-historical method". This "method focuses attention . . . upon grammatical constructions and historical contexts out of which the Scriptures were written."

Libertarian Christians do not quibble with any of these three primary rules of interpretation. The point at which they insist on tweaking the Reformed hermeneutic is in one of the ten heuristics (rules of thumb) that R.C. Sproul posits in his book, Knowing Scripture. The rule of thumb that they insist on tweaking is the heuristic that "Historical Narratives Are to Be Interpreted by the Didactic". The Apostle Paul's letters are generally understood to be in the didactic (teaching) genre of literature. This rule of thumb indicates that interpretation of the historical narratives in the four gospels and in the historical narratives in the Torah (the Pentateuch) should be controlled by what is clearly taught in Paul's epistles. Libertarian Christians believe that this rule of thumb is generally true, but that it is not true about one particular genre of literature that appears embedded in historical narratives in the gospels and the Torah. The exceptional genre is the jurisprudential genre of literature that exists at a covenantal level of abstraction, as distinguished from merely being at a less encompassing level of abstraction.

Libertarian Christians believe that by tweaking the Reformed hermeneutic in this manner, two historically debilitating problems in Reformed theology can be overcome. One of the problems pertains to how to interpret Romans 13:1-7. The other problem pertains to how to define the "covenant of works", the "covenant of grace", and the relationship between these two.

== Jurisprudential implications ==
An important implication of this tweaked Reformed hermeneutic is that most theology that has been accepted as true by Reformed theologians over the last few centuries is accepted as true by libertarian Christians. Most of what has been generally accepted as true by Reformed systematic theologies over the last several centuries arises out of what Porter's Hermeneutical Prologue for Discovering Basic Jurisdictional Principles calls "topical exegeses". He contrasts topical exegesis with what he calls "chronological exegesis". In the latter form of exegesis, he starts at Genesis 1:1 with the belief that the generally reliable topical exegeses done by his predecessors are a reliable control for going chronologically through the Bible's historical narrative, focusing on the jurisprudential genre that is embedded there, with the exception that his predecessors' exegesis of jurisprudential passages has been in some respects deficient. This acceptance of the theological works of his Reformed predecessors includes the acceptance of Thomas Aquinas’ categorization of laws into eternal law, natural law, divine law, and human law. Even so, his Hermeneutical Prologue customizes definitions of these categories. In the process, his work eschews the normal definitions of natural law, holds that natural law is tripartite, holds that the moral law that governs human behavior is one leg of the tripartite natural law, and holds that moral law and natural law should never be conflated with human law. That book, and Porter's works in general, hold that human law is nothing more than laws that humans impose on other humans. Porter acknowledges that human law and positive law, as presently conceived by the legal community in the United States, are largely the same thing. But he generally eschews the latter terminology because of its connection to legal positivism.

Porter finds three covenants in the first eleven chapters of Genesis. His chronological exegesis holds that these covenants combine to be a single covenant. He finds a single covenant posited in Genesis 1–2; a second covenant that amends the original covenant posited in Genesis 3; and a third covenant posited in Genesis 9 that amends that pre-existing covenant. Even though moral law appears prior to Genesis 9, no biblically prescribed human law appears until Genesis 9:6. That verse is in many respects equivalent to the non-aggression principle posited by secular libertarians. Reading these first eleven chapters, in the views of libertarian Christians, makes it obvious that the single covenant that results from the chronological combination of these first three covenants of the Bible, applies to all people alive after the flood. This means that all post-diluvian people are party to this covenant, according to this view, regardless of whether they like it or not. Even though this may sound like a dangerous and foreboding belief, libertarian Christians emphasize that the only prescription of human law in these first eleven chapters is at Genesis 9:6. Because the combination of these three covenants applies to all people, libertarian Christians call these three covenants "global".

In this libertarian Christian view, the global covenant that exists in the first eleven chapters of Genesis is contrasted in some respects with the three major covenants that follow them. The libertarian Christian view is that human beings enter the global covenant through "pre-cognitive consent", meaning consent that exists prior to the development of cognitive abilities. In the same way that human beings must necessarily give pre-cognitive consent to having two arms, two legs, two eyes, one head, etc., they must necessarily give pre-cognitive consent to abide by the moral law posited in Genesis 1-11, including pre-cognitive consent to abide by the non-aggression principle that is posited in Genesis 9:6. In contrast to this way of entering the global covenant, people enter the Bible's subsequent three major covenants through "cognitive consent". In this libertarian Christian view, the Abrahamic, Mosaic, and Messianic covenants can only be entered through consent that is the willing, conscious choice of each human party to the covenant. Because all humans are not party to these covenants, libertarian Christians call them "local".

According to libertarian Christians, one extremely important contribution that American jurisprudence has made to Christian jurisprudence is its emphasis on jurisdiction. American law has long held that in order for a court to genuinely establish that it has jurisdiction over a case, it must establish that it has jurisdiction over the persons involved in the case, over the subject matter of the case, and over the geographical location from which the case arose. These are fundamental jurisprudential concepts. Libertarian Christians believe that each of these six major covenants of the Bible establishes its own personal jurisdiction, subject matter jurisdiction, and geographical jurisdiction.

With such fundamental jurisprudential concepts established in the hermeneutical part of his book, Hermeneutical Prologue, Part I, Porter proceeds to follow this hermeneutic in his exposition of the rest of the Bible. His aim is at resolving what he deems to be the common misconstruction, even among Reformed theologians, of Romans 13:1-7, and similar New Testament passages. Porter contends that traditional theologies, both Reformed and otherwise, have generally failed to properly apply the Reformed hermeneutic to Romans 13 and other such passages. His reasoning is that because the Bible interprets itself, it is necessary to assume that much of the terminology that exists in Romans 13 and other such passages should be defined by other parts of the Bible. So terms like "governing authorities", "subjection", "ordinance of God", "rulers", "minister of God", "avenger who brings wrath upon one who practices evil", "bear the sword", "taxes", etc., should not be understood to have vernacular meanings, but must be defined within this much larger legal framework that arises out of these six major covenants. After Part I, defining such terms within this larger context is the primary goal of his book. Ending the confusion that has historically arisen out of application of "covenant of grace" to the entire Bible from Genesis 3 to the end, without sufficient regard to the jurisdictions of these post-Edenic covenants, is an additional benefit that happens as a side effect of following Porter's hermeneutical program.

== Ramifications for the social contract ==
The most prominent difference between Rothbard's brand of Austro-libertarianism — as espoused in his book, The Ethics of Liberty — and libertarian Christianity revolves around his rejection of the social contract theory of government. Libertarian Christians have Bible-based concepts of natural law and the social contract. In contrast, Rothbard believes in natural law, but he does not believe in any viable social contract theory. In John Locke's Second Treatise on Civil Government, Locke speaks of people surrendering natural rights in the process of entering a social contract, or more specifically, trading rights for the benefits of participation in the social contract. He indicates that this is a voluntary and consensual process. But Locke fails to show how, once the social contract is established, the offspring of the original contract-makers volunteer into the contract, and thereby perpetuate the consensual nature of the original contract. This is the first of two major problems that Rothbard sees in the social contract. Rothbard recognizes this flaw not only in Locke's philosophy, but also in the organic documents of the United States. The second problem arises by way of Rothbard's commitment to a strict "title-transfer" theory of contracts. Because of these two problems, Rothbard rejects the social contract theory of government entirely. — Rather than rejecting the social contract because of these two problems, libertarian Christians use biblical exegesis to discover non-statist solutions to them. To solve the first problem, libertarian Christianity shows how offspring of the original contract-makers either enter the contract voluntarily and consensually, or do not enter it at all (thereby removing themselves from the social contract's jurisdiction). To solve the second problem, libertarian Christians hold to a "property-interest" theory of contracts that allows for the alienation of interests in labor and actions. Because Rothbard appears to embrace a metaphysical libertarian definition of the human will, libertarian Christians generally eschew his belief that the will is utterly inalienable. Nevertheless, they find an extremely important place for his title-transfer theory of contracts in the secular arena, but not as a negation of the social contract. In their view, Rothbard's anarcho-capitalism is inherently dysfunctional without a social contract that is understood to have a perpetual existence.

There is no doubt that libertarian Christians have benefited from Rothbard's, and others’, clarification of what the non-aggression principle means. They have also benefited from Rothbard's distinction between the title-transfer theory of contracts and the promise-expectation theory. Although they reject Rothbard's complete rejection of the social contract theory of government, they do find an important place for the title-transfer theory under the jurisdiction of what they call "secular social compacts".

== Other ramifications ==
Libertarian Christians affirm absolute predestination. They also believe in "free will" to the extent that free will is a necessary prerequisite to moral accountability. Following the Westminster Confession of Faith (WCF), Chapter 3, they believe that "God from all eternity did . . . freely and unchangeably ordain whatsoever comes to pass; yet so as thereby neither is God the author of sin; nor is violence offered to the will of the creatures, nor is the liberty or contingency of second causes taken away, but rather established." By believing in predestination, libertarian Christians believe in determinism to the extent that determinism is congruent with their view of predestination. They also believe in "free will", as long as the meaning of the expression is circumscribed by principles like those expressed in WCF, Chapter 9, "Free Will". Since metaphysical libertarianism patently rejects the precept that God has "from all eternity . . . ordain[ed] whatsoever comes to pass," libertarian Christians patently reject metaphysical libertarianism as humanistic. On the other hand, libertarian Christians also reject so-called hard determinism due to the fact that its rejection of free will eliminates the possibility of moral accountability and just punishment.

Libertarian Christianity distinguishes itself from less rigorous approaches to political theology by having beliefs about law and government that derive from a distinct framework for interpreting the Bible. Less rigorous approaches to libertarian Christianity and Christian libertarianism are seen by rigorous libertarian Christians as being more ad hoc and less systematic. Rigorous libertarian Christians try emphatically to distinguish themselves from people who try to blend their commitments to secular libertarianism with their simultaneous commitments to Christian dominionism / reconstructionism / theonomy. Libertarian Christians are emphatic about this distinction because, like practically all other forms of Christian political theology, these non-rigorous theologies fail to recognize the distinction between the global and local covenants. Libertarianism is a natural outgrowth of the global covenant because Genesis 9:6 contains the only prescription of human law in the Bible that applies to all human beings. In contrast, the numerous human laws prescribed in the Mosaic covenant only apply to people who volunteer to be subject to such laws. Such Mosaic laws certainly have important moral ramifications for the entire human race, but they do not apply, as human law, to anyone except those who volunteer to be party to that covenant, unless such laws are clearly reiterations of the non-aggression principle found in Genesis 9:6. So the laws of the Mosaic covenant cannot be applied willy-nilly to people who are not party to that covenant. Or so the libertarian Christian thinking goes.

Libertarian Christians agree with reconstructionists with regard to the manner in which Bible-based moral law is discovered, specifically, with the analogy-of-faith interpretive principle. But libertarian Christians disagree with theonomic reconstructionism, including reconstructionists who claim to be libertarian, in regards to the proper hermeneutics to use to discover the biblical prescription of human law. Christians who are not libertarian Christians generally deduce the biblical prescription of human law directly from their beliefs about Bible-based moral law. In contrast, libertarian Christians believe that the biblical prescription of human law cannot be deduced directly from biblical moral law. They believe that instead, the task of discovering the biblical prescription of human law demands a strictly chronological hermeneutic that has very little dependence upon prior discoveries about the Bible's moral law.

A most obvious point at which the libertarian Christian hermeneutical agenda conflicts with Christians who claim to be libertarian through some other hermeneutic is in regard to so-called victimless crimes. For example, comparison of the relative attitudes towards victimless crimes held by prototypical secular libertarian, Murray Rothbard, and the prototypical Christian libertarian, Andrew Sandlin, shows that secular libertarianism and Christian libertarianism are not very compatible. From the libertarian Christian's perspective, the comparison shows that Christian libertarianism's attempted amalgamation of secular libertarianism lacks rational integrity. Libertarian Christians believe this lack of rational integrity in the Christian libertarian legal philosophy is a symptom of Christian libertarianism's erroneous hermeneutics. Rothbard wrote:

[T]the most important argument for Prohibition was the undoubted fact that people commit significantly more crimes, more acts of negligence on the highways, when under the influence of alcohol than when cold sober. So why not prohibit alcohol . . . I submit that there is only one why not, and this should be no news to libertarians who presumably believe in inalienable individual rights: namely, that no one has the right to coerce anyone not himself directly engaged in an overt act of aggression against rights. Any loosening of this criterion, to include coercion against remote "risks," is to sanction impermissible aggression against the rights of others.

Libertarian Christians believe that this prototypical secular libertarian argument applies with equal logic to all so-called victimless crimes. According to Rothbard, secular libertarianism gives no place to the state for punishment of victimless crimes. The same cannot be said for Christian libertarianism according to Sandlin, who wrote:

[T]he state must punish murder (Ex. 21:12), theft (Ex. 22:1-4), idolatry (Ex. 22:20), and other sins that the Scriptures explicitly requires it to punish. Since we may deduce from Scripture that abortion is murder (see Ex. 21:22, 23), that copyright infringement is theft, and that the public worship of the Earth by New Age advocates is idolatry, the state may suppress these crimes.

In a secular state, according to secular libertarianism, idolatry is a victimless crime (or rather, shouldn't be a crime at all), and to punish it would itself be a crime. Biblical standards of morality call for the proscription of libertine behavior, such as drug addiction, alcoholism, prostitution, gambling, and idol worship. Theonomic reconstructionists and Christian libertarians generally believe that wherever such behavior is made morally repugnant by biblical standards of morality, the secular government is rightly authorized to punish practitioners. Libertarian Christians believe that in regard to victimless crimes, the secular libertarian position is more rational and more consistent with the Bible than the Christian libertarian position. In contrast to Christian libertarians, libertarian Christians believe that behaviors that violate biblical standards of morality, but are nevertheless victimless crimes, are rightly punished only within the ambit of the visible Church, and should be dealt with otherwise through free market processes. Libertarian Christians believe that secular governments are never authorized by Scripture to punish such immorality unless there is undeniable proof that a contract has been broken or real damage to another person's property (including this other person's ownership of his/her physical body) can be proven beyond a reasonable doubt.

Libertarian Christians also have a major difference with theonomic Christian libertarians with regard to apologetics. While theonomic Christian libertarians adhere to presuppositional apologetics, libertarian Christians do not. Use of presuppositional apologetics makes the development of Bible-based natural law rationally impossible. In libertarian Christianity, the existence of Bible-based natural law is a prerequisite to the discovery of Bible-based natural rights, because such natural rights are a subset of such natural law. Along with a Bible-based concept of the social contract, Bible-based natural law and Bible-based natural rights are the core of the libertarian Christian's Bible-based political and legal philosophy. But theonomic Christian libertarians believe in neither natural law nor social contract theory.

Libertarian Christians believe that it is important to understand natural rights within the overall context established by the interpretive framework from which they derive, for three overriding reasons: (a) They believe that maintaining the rational linkage of their political and legal theology to the Bible is important for the sake of distinguishing their libertarianism from libertinism. (b) They believe that maintaining the rational linkage of their political and legal theology to the Bible is important for the sake of distinguishing libertarian Christianity from any breed of libertarianism that presumes to authorize secular governments to punish victimless crimes. (c) They believe that maintaining the rational linkage of their political and legal philosophy to the Bible is important because the structure of the biblical covenants acts as a template for building human governments from the ground up, and eschewing statism in the process, where Porter defines statism as "a belief system that allows and even encourages human governments to exist that revel in jurisdictional dysfunction".

== Application ==
Since the so-called "COVID-19 pandemic" started in late 2019, most Christian churches in the United States have been largely closed. Arguments about whether that has been a genuine medical necessity or an authoritarian attempt at destroying Christianity are outside the scope of this article. Nevertheless, libertarian Christians believe that the visible "body of Christ" on earth, especially in the United States, has been surrendering authority and territory to secular governments for a long time, and that it is now necessary to reverse that trend. Towards that end, Porter has posited a strategy for dealing with what he believes is massive jurisdictional dysfunction both in the United States and around the world. This strategy is based on the jurisdictions that he and other libertarian Christians believe exist in the biblical covenants.

To libertarian Christians, this strategy does not require that people change their religions so that they become libertarian Christian. But it does require that people gain some understanding of the "natural rights polity". According to libertarian Christians, the natural rights polity arises naturally and rationally out of Bible study by way libertarian Christian hermeneutics. Libertarian Christians believe that these hermeneutics lead to the belief that because all people have natural rights, and because all people have a moral duty to voluntarily enforce against people who violate other people's natural rights, all people should be interested in the natural rights polity regardless of whether they are Christian or not. According to this way of thinking, the natural rights polity arises out of the global covenant. Many people may not care where it comes from, but may nevertheless want to abide by it simply as a function of common grace.

The natural rights polity holds that there is an important distinction between "secular social compacts" and "religious social compacts". A secular social compact does nothing more than execute justice against Genesis 9:6 bloodshed, against the non-aggression principle. In contrast, a religious social compact focuses primarily on pursuing the beliefs and practices of a given religion, regardless of whether the religion is Christian, Hindu, Buddhist, Jewish, Islamic, or whatever. But the people within a religious social compact, like all other people, are called to abide by the non-aggression principle, and even to execute justice against people who violate such principle. So this natural rights polity holds that it is reasonable for religious social compacts to have some subset of those party to the compact who are dedicated to executing justice against people who violate natural rights. An examination of the role of the ruling elder in Presbyterian church polity should be helpful in explicating what this means.

Presbyterian church polity has long called for the existence of ruling elders, as well as of teaching elders, preaching elders, and deacons. These are each distinct offices within the church. "Ruling elders are called to minister in partnership with teaching elders. Within this calling, ruling elders have responsibilities in several areas of the life of the church including exercise in leadership, governance, spiritual discernment, and discipline." The existence of ruling elders in Presbyterian denominations is based on the pattern that Presbyterian theologians believe exists in the Old Testament. The reason ruling elders are important to libertarian Christian church polity, and to the natural rights polity in general, revolves around the "discipline" function of the ruling elder. Such discipline is necessary for two reasons: to keep the membership of the local church in conformity to biblical standards of morality, and to protect the local church against outside violations of the non-aggression principle that could damage or destroy the church if unchallenged. So the ruling elder is called to uphold biblical standards of morality among those who have volunteered to be party to the local church, regardless of whether violations of such standards arise out of violations of the non-aggression principle or not. The ruling elder is also called to exercise discipline outside the local church when the local church is threatened with violations of the non-aggression principle. At least, this is what libertarian Christians contend.

Traditionally the arena outside the local church has been left to the state to discipline. But when the state has gone so rogue that it threatens the existence and health of the local church, libertarian Christians contend that ruling elders must take action to terminate such external threats. But the exercise of such actions outside the local church must be limited to the execution of justice against violations of the non-aggression principle, and they should not be understood to encompass violations of biblical standards of morality in general. This is because the non-aggression principle applies to all human beings, whereas biblical standards of morality encompass far more than the non-aggression principle. In fact, because the non-aggression principle applies to all human beings, regardless of whether they like it or not, people from all religions and denominations are called to execute justice against violations of the non-aggression principle. In fact, libertarian Christians believe that this is the only valid function of secular government, to execute justice and equity against violations of the non-aggression principle. According to this way of thinking, secular governments are not called to conduct weddings, run schools, run hospitals, run mass transportation, run welfare and entitlement programs, or to do a massive number of other things that secular governments in the United States are currently doing on a day-do-day basis. This includes conducting responses to a so-called "pandemic". If a pandemic results from a bio-weapon released by a foreign nation on the population of the United States, then the primary responsibility of the U.S. government is to bring that foreign nation to justice. That does not include remedying the effects of the so-called pandemic, because such remedies are the responsibility of private entities. It also does not include such secular government colluding with secular corporations to find remedy, because such corporations then merely become arms of the state.

To remedy this problem of rogue secular governments and rogue secular corporations trying, covertly if not overtly, to destroy the body of Christ on earth, Porter recommends what he calls a "pincer strategy". Above all, this strategy requires that all Christian churches, both Presbyterian and otherwise, form internal cadres of ruling elders for the primary purpose of defending the local church against any and all external forces that are trying to destroy local churches through violation of the non-aggression principle. That is one leg of the pincer strategy. The other leg is for all people, regardless of their religion, who are educated in and believe in the natural rights polity to enter the secular arena and try to change secular governments and secular corporations so that they both come into conformity to the natural rights polity. If this latter leg of the pincer strategy were successful soon enough, then it could return the United States to solid footing in constitutional government and rule of law before the entire social superstructure collapses. So goes the thinking of libertarian Christians.

== See also ==
- Christianity and politics
- Christian nationalism
- Christian reconstructionism
- Christian right
- Christian views on the Old Covenant
- Common grace
- Cultural conservatism
- Cultural mandate
- Dominion theology
- Liberation theology
- Postmillennialism
- Protestant fundamentalism
- Protestant work ethic
- Religious views on capitalism
- Sphere sovereignty
- Theoconservatism
- Thomas Aquinas' criticism of the notion of Self-organization
