= John Drosdick =

American businessman (born 1943)

John Girard Drosdick
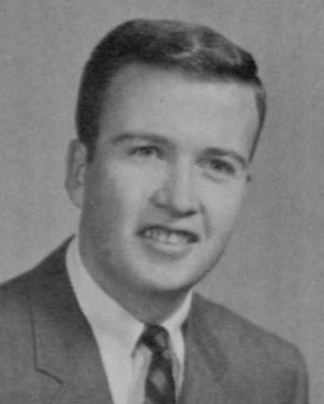
- Born: August 9, 1943 (age 82); Hazleton, Pennsylvania
- Education: Villanova University (BS 1965); University of Massachusetts (MS 1968)
- Spouse: Gloria Jayne Shenosky (m. 1966)

John Girard Drosdick (born August 9, 1943) is an American businessman who served 8 years as president, chief executive officer and chairman of the board of directors of Sunoco Inc. As of 2006, he was the fifteenth-highest-paid chief executive officer in the United States. In 2008, he was replaced by Lynn Laverty Elsenhans.

== Career ==
He is also chairman of the Board of Trustees of Villanova University and serves on the boards of directors of H. J. Heinz Company and U.S. Steel.

== Philanthropy ==
Drosdick provided a $2.5 million commitment to Villanova University, as part of the University's $600 million Comprehensive Capital Campaign.

== Personal life ==
Drosdick received a Bachelor of Science degree in chemical engineering from Villanova and a Master of Science degree in chemical engineering from the University of Massachusetts Amherst.
