= Pennsylvania Grade Crude Oil =

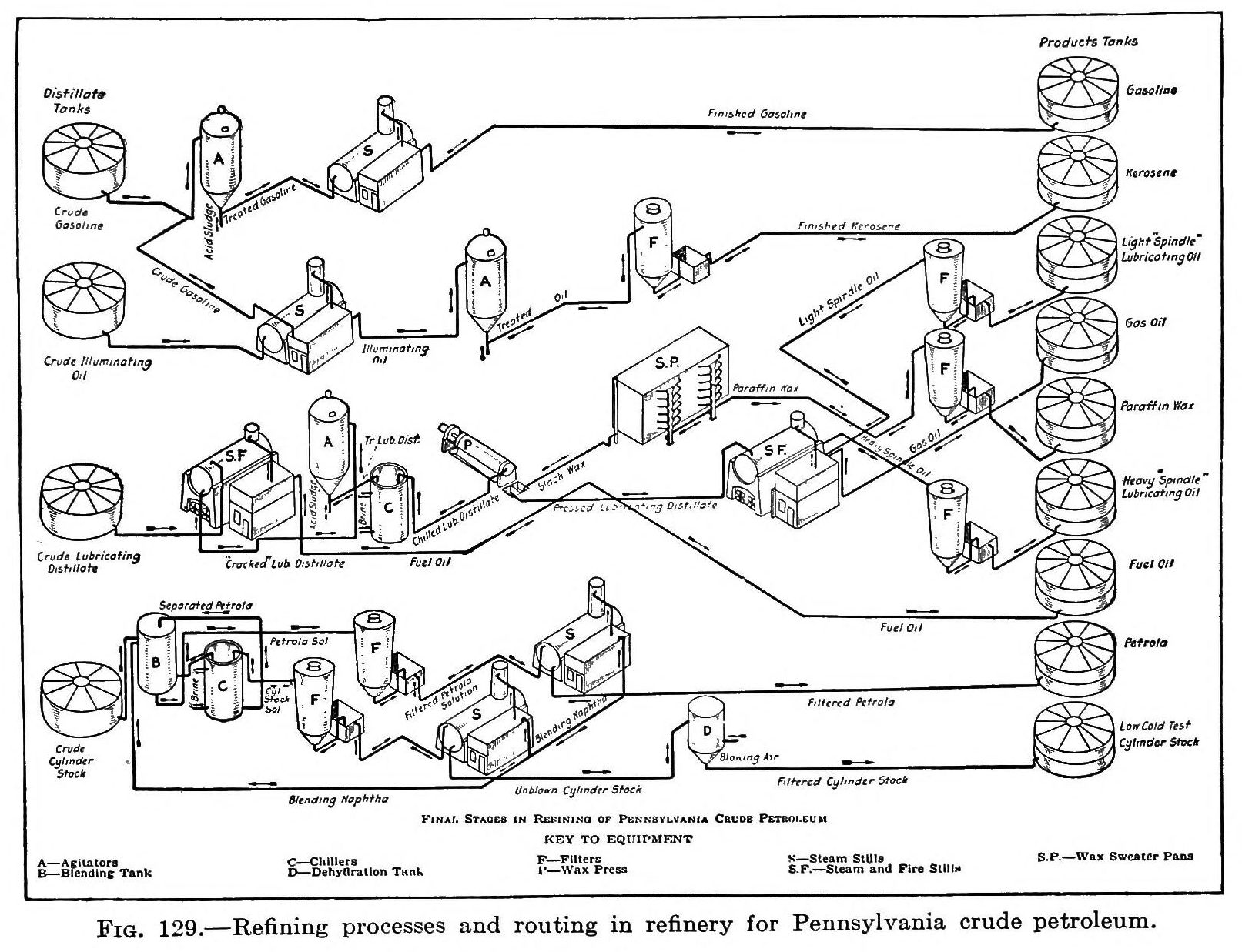
Refining processes and routing in refinery for Pennsylvania crude petroleum, 1921. (Source: Marshall, 1921)

Pennsylvania Grade Crude Oil is a type of sweet crude oil (sweet crude oil), found primarily in the Appalachian basin in the Marcellus Formation in the states of New York, Pennsylvania, Ohio, and West Virginia, and takes its name for the state of Pennsylvania, where it was first extracted in 1859 from the Drake Well.

== Background ==
The area's Pennsylvania Grade Crude Oil has superior qualities and is free of asphaltic constituents, contains only trace amounts of sulfur and nitrogen, and has excellent characteristics for refining into lubricants. The success of drilling for oil at this well led to "an international search for petroleum, and in many ways eventually changed the way we live." There is archaeological evidence that Native Americans harvested "the oil for medicinal purposes by digging small pits around active seeps and lining them with wood" at least as far back as 1410 AD. European settlers skimmed the "oil from the seeps and using the petroleum as a source of lamp fuel and machinery lubrication."

Pennsylvania grade crude oil can be broken down into gasoline, kerosene, fuel oil, gas oil, wax distillate, cylinder stock (or bottoms) and other refined products such as white oil and paraffin. Pennsylvania grade crude oil when seen in reflected sunlight has a green color and under ultraviolet light looks fluorescent.

Pennsylvania grade crude oil is thermally stable and has a high viscosity index. It is generally free of asphalt and has only trace amounts of sulfur and nitrogen. It is also high in paraffin and other waxes making it highly desirable for refinement into petroleum lubricants such as motor oil. Its products are also valuable for use in certain hydraulic applications. By-products are commonly found in consumer goods such as cosmetics, and topical ointments.

Products refined from this type of oil are particularly prized as lubricants and many oil companies prominently display the fact that they use Pennsylvania Grade crude oil in their products.

Bradford, Pennsylvania is major center for the refining of Pennsylvania grade crude oil.

== Pennsylvania Grade Crude Oil: the first well ==
Pennsylvania Grade Crude Oil was first extracted from the Drake Well, which was drilled by Edwin Drake in "the middle of quiet farm country in northwestern Pennsylvania" in 1859. It was the "first successful oil well that was drilled for the sole purpose of finding oil." His success led to "an international search for petroleum, and in many ways eventually changed the way we live."

== Pennsylvania Grade Crude Oil: the first oil boom ==
With the success of the first drilled well, in the quiet farming region around Oil Creek towns like Bradford were created and the area was rapidly transformed into the center of the Pennsylvania oil rush in the late 19th century, similar to the growth of gold rush towns of the Wild West. The original Drake Well burned to the ground only a few months after it was built and a second well was erected. In the late nineteenth century, early developers had no geological knowledge of the geological formation and wells were drilled at random with derricks built very close together. "There were frequent fires that raged out of control." Until the East Texas oil boom the oil Regions in Pennsylvania were responsible for fifty percent of the world's oil production.

== Bradford ==
The community of Bradford emerged as a wild oil boom town in the Pennsylvania oil rush in the late 19th century. In 1881, Joseph Newton Pew (1848–1912), founder of Sun Oil Company (now Sunoco) developed the Keystone Gas Company which used the by-products of oil, such as natural gas, to provide heat and light for By 1889 Newton's Keystone Gas Company was delivering gas to Pittsburgh.

Bradford is still a major center for the refining of Pennsylvania grade crude oil.
