= James W. Fifield Jr. =

American Congregational minister (1899–1977)

James William Fifield Jr. (June 5, 1899 – February 25, 1977) was an American Congregational minister who led the First Congregational Church in Los Angeles and was co-founder and president of the conservative free-market organization Spiritual Mobilization.

Fifield emerged as one of the leading Protestant opponents of the Social Gospel, arguing that Christianity was fundamentally aligned with individual liberty, free enterprise, and limited government. Nicknamed "The Apostle to Millionaires", he was instrumental in ushering in an alliance of corporate-funded Christianity and Christian identity politics in the United States.

== Early life ==
Born in Chicago, Fifield grew up in Kansas City, Missouri, where his father was a Congregational minister. After having served in the infantry during World War I, he received a Master of Arts degree from University of Chicago in 1921. In 1924, he obtained a Bachelor of Divinity degree from the Chicago Theological Seminary and was ordained a minister.

== First Congregational Church in Los Angeles ==
Fifield received an honorary Doctor of Divinity degree from Chicago Theological Seminary in 1934. The following year, he moved to Los Angeles to head the First Congregational Church.

The First Congregational Church was at the time heavily indebted due to the costs of a cathedral-style building which had a 176 foot high tower, more than 100 rooms, auditoriums, and a gymnasium. The church had 1,500 members at Fifield's arrival, but after Fifield initiated a major increase in activities membership rose to over 4,500 in the beginning of the 1940s and the debt was paid off in 1942.

The members of the First Congregational Church were mostly among the wealthy, giving Fifield the nickname "The Apostle to Millionaires". According to Kevin Kruse, Fifield was politically conservative but doctrinally liberal, and crafted an interpretation of the Bible that catered to his congregation. Kruse argues that Fifield dismissed the many passages in the New Testament about wealth and poverty, and instead assured the elite that their worldly success was a sign of God's blessings.

The Church from 1937 to 1942 paid substantial money to Spiritual Mobilization.

Fifield strongly opposed a merger of the Congregational Christian Churches with the Evangelical and Reformed Church to form the United Church of Christ. The merger was approved by a clear majority of the general council of the Congregational churches in 1949, and Fifield became part of the minority movement that tried to stop the merger from going through. The merger was completed in 1957.

== Spiritual Mobilization ==
In 1935, Fifield co-founded Mobilization for Spiritual Ideas with president of Carleton College Donald J. Cowling and William Hocking. Fifield started his religious-political organization Spiritual Mobilization in 1935. He became its president; its ideology has been described by Kevin M. Kruse and others as Christian libertarianism. "Freedom under God" was a much used phrase by Fifield and the organization. The message was mainly directed towards Congregational, Presbyterian and Episcopal ministers and laymen through radio and television programs and a monthly magazine Faith and Freedom with William Johnson as editor and James C. Ingebretsen as a major contributor.

Fiefield and the organization attracted the attention of oil baron J. Howard Pew and former President Herbert Hoover whom Fifield met and with whom he corresponded.

In 1940, Fifield gave a speech to the National Association of Manufacturers at the Waldorf Astoria New York where he praised capitalism and business leaders, while denouncing Franklin D. Roosevelt and the New Deal. The speech, which underlined that Christian leaders and religious arguments were crucial in the effort to promote a free-market agenda, was exceptionally well received.

In 1949, Spiritual Mobilization started broadcasting a short radio program called "The Freedom Story". By late 1951 the program, which included brief remarks by Fifield, was broadcast on more than 800 radio stations. It featured a variety of content, notably including a radio adaptation of the libertarian novella Anthem by Ayn Rand.

In 1951, the Anti-Defamation League demanded an apology from Fifield after he falsely stated in a program that "it was a matter of historical record that Benjamin Franklin denounced the Jews at the Constitutional Convention in 1787." On other occasions, Fifield and his organization were also accused of racism and anti-semitism. He successfully campaigned to remove UNESCO material from use in schools in Los Angeles.

In 1961, Fifield hosted and had televised on his own show a speaking appearance by Robert W. Welch Jr., the founder and leader of the John Birch Society. Fifield called the Birch Society "a very important enterprise that might help save our freedoms" and helped Welch expand the organization to California.

== Awards ==
Fifield received an honorary Doctor of Divinity degree from Chicago Theological Seminary in 1934.
