= Aloha Petroleum =

Gasoline marketer in Hawaii

Aloha Petroleum, Ltd.
- Type: Subsidiary
- Industry: Retail and wholesale trade
- Founded: Honolulu (1977)
- Headquarters: Honolulu, United States
- Number of locations: 60
- Area served: Oahu, Hawaii
- Services: Petroleum products, convenience stores
- Parent: Sunoco
- Website: www.alohagas.com

Aloha Petroleum, Ltd. is a gasoline retailer and convenience store operator in Hawaii. Founded in 1977, the company has expanded to include close to one hundred gas stations and close to fifty convenience stores. In 2014, Aloha was acquired by Sunoco in a $240 million transaction. In 2016, Aloha was awarded the exclusive Dunkin' Donuts franchise for the state of Hawaii.

== History ==
Aloha Petroleum was founded in 1977. In 1988, Tom Malone became president and CEO of the company. Under his leadership, the company expanded to include more than 60 locations and began operating a fuel storage terminal at Barbers Point. In 1997, Aloha Petroleum began importing fuel from Asia rather than purchasing it directly from local refineries. The State of Hawaii alleged in a 1998 lawsuit against major oil companies that Aloha made this switch after being boycotted by companies for their low prices. Those allegations were strongly contested by the oil companies, who argued that Aloha had willingly switched and had partnered with oil companies to build terminals. The state's expert witnesses ultimately conceded that any price changes may not have been the result of price fixing and settled the lawsuit for $20 million, 1% of the state's initial $2 billion demand.

Malone died in 2004 and was succeeded as CEO by Bob Maynard. Aloha Petroleum purchased 20 gas stations from U.S. Restaurant Properties in 2005. It additionally attempted to purchase 18 stations from Trustreet Properties, however, this purchase was blocked by federal regulators, who alleged anti-competitive activities. The purchase was approved later that year when Aloha agreed to share access to its fuel storage terminal with competitors. In 2011, the company sold 11 of its gas stations to Getty Realty.

In 2008, Maynard was succeeded by Richard Parry as president and CEO, with Maynard becoming chairman of the company's board of directors. Under his leadership, Aloha purchased all of Shell's retail locations and terminals in Hawaii. In 2014, Sunoco purchased Aloha for $240 million. The deal included all of Aloha's assets, including 44 convenience stores and nearly 100 gas stations, with all employees keeping their jobs. The following year, Aloha acquired all of MFM Inc's Hawaii stations.

Aloha became the sole franchisee for Dunkin' Donuts in Hawaii in 2016. Parry retired in 2018 and was replaced by Tom Grimes, the company's vice president and CFO. In 2022, Aloha sued its insurer, the National Union Fire Insurance Company, for failing to defend it in climate change lawsuits brought against the company by Honolulu and the Maui County. The insurer argued that the climate change lawsuits were related to pollutants, which were excluded under the insurer's clauses. The case was resolved by the Supreme Court of Hawaii in 2024, who sided with the insurer.
