= Joseph N. Pew Jr. =

American businessman

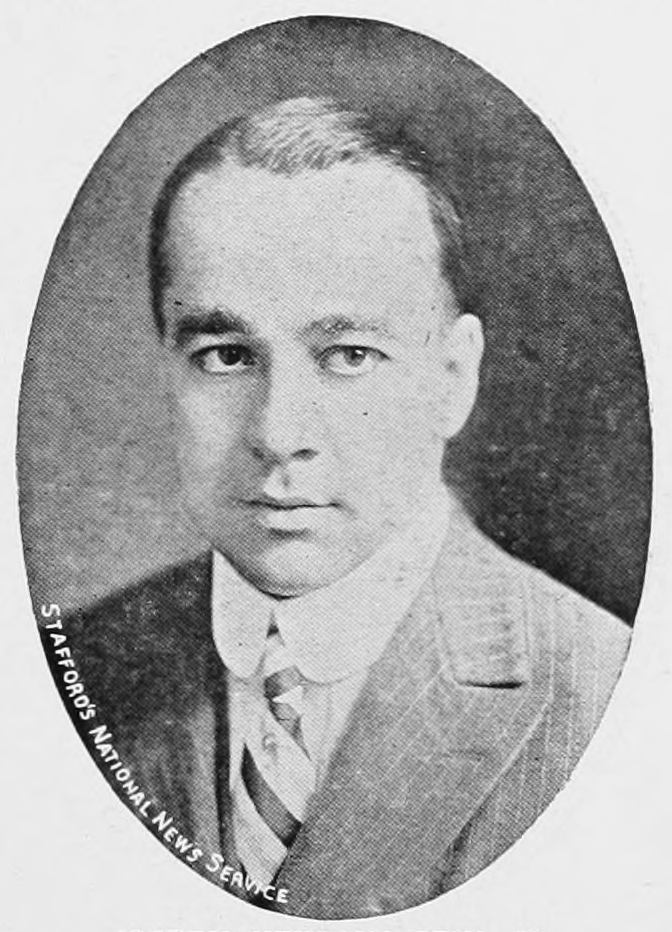
- Born: November 12, 1886; Pittsburgh, Pennsylvania, U.S.
- Died: April 9, 1963 (aged 76); Philadelphia, Pennsylvania, U.S.
- Resting place: West Laurel Hill Cemetery
- Education: Cornell University
- Occupation: Industrialist
- Political party: Republican Party
- Spouse: Alberta C. Hensel
- Children: 5

Joseph Newton Pew Jr. (November 12, 1886 – April 9, 1963) was an American industrialist and influential member of the Republican Party.

== Early life ==
Born in Pittsburgh, Pennsylvania, Pew was the youngest son of Mary Anderson Pew and Joseph N. Pew. Called "Joe," he attended Shady Side Academy and graduated from Cornell University with a degree in mechanical engineering in 1908. As an undergraduate, Pew was captain of the track team and won the IC4A championship in the hammer throw. He was also a member of the Quill and Dagger society. As an outstanding athlete and donor to Cornell athletics, he was inducted into the Cornell University Athletic Hall of Fame in 1986.

Pew married Alberta C. Hensel and had five children.

== Sun Oil ==
In 1908, after graduation, Pew began work at Sun Oil, a business founded by his father in 1890. When his father died in 1912, Pew became vice president at the age of 26 and his brother, J. Howard Pew, became president of Sun Oil at the age of 30.

Marcus Hook Refinery

In 1901, Joseph N. Pew Sr. purchased 82 acres in Marcus Hook, Pennsylvania along the Delaware River, for the Sunoco Refinery. The refinery which was prosperous immediately, was operational in early 1902. The two Pew brothers were instrumental in the expansion and success of Sun Oil. Joseph N. Pew Jr. persuaded the company to lay gasoline pipelines from the Marcus Hook refinery to distribution points in Ohio, New York, and New Jersey and then negotiated with 1,000 landholders in four states for permission to cross their property. The Lindenthorpe Mansion on the Delaware River waterfront became the Sunoco plant headquarters.

In 1916, Pew and his brother J. Howard, who had become Sun Oil’s president in 1912, expanded into the shipbuilding business. Joseph Jr. ran the Sun Shipbuilding & Drydock Company in Chester, Pennsylvania, which would become the largest private shipyard and biggest producer of oil tankers in America by World War II. As visionary of the company, it was Pew who was behind the effort to develop gasoline without tetraethyl lead, creating Blue Sunoco. He also developed a gyroscopic instrument with high-speed camera and timing device for preventing the drilling of crooked holes in oil wells. Receiving a patent in 1926, the device helped the company drill deeper oil wells.

Known for their commitment to employees, the Pews never laid off a single Sun Oil employee during the Great Depression and also developed one of the first stock-sharing plans for employees.

Pew remained vice president of the company until being appointed chairman in 1947. He was chairman until his death in Philadelphia, PA in 1963. Pew hired his Quill and Dagger classmate from Cornell, Samuel B. Eckert, who served as Sun Oil treasurer and vice president.

== Political career ==
In 1933–34 Pew went to Washington, D.C., to fight the New Deal petroleum code, which he believed would lead to price-fixing. This endeavor was the beginning of his political career. Pew was heavily involved in Republican politics, mostly in Pennsylvania, for much of his life and was a delegate to Republican National Convention. He employed John Hamilton as a personal advisor and political consultant. He strongly opposed President Franklin D. Roosevelt and his New Deal policies, such as price-fixing and organized labor. By strategically spending millions of dollars, Pew earned a reputation as Pennsylvania's political boss, controlling state and national elections. He funded the operations and staff of the Republican National Committee headquarters in an effort to keep Franklin D. Roosevelt out of office. Although largely unsuccessful on the national scene, Pew's work in his home state was responsible for a number of elections. Pew is also given credit for the election of both Arthur H. James and Edward Martin as Pennsylvania Governor and Bernard Samuel as Mayor of Philadelphia.

Pew appeared on the cover of Time Magazine on May 6, 1940 as "Republican Pew" along with an article about his political involvement.

== Philanthropy ==
In 1948, Pew and his siblings founded The Pew Charitable Trusts, a group of philanthropic foundations that support social needs around the world. Among the foundation’s funded projects is the Pew Research Center, a nonpartisan opinion research group that focuses on issues of the press, public policy, and politics.

As of 2007, it was one of the nation's wealthiest foundations. The first grant given to education was to Cornell University, where the Pew Engineering Quad and an engineering professorship bear his name. In 1951, Pew began an effort to assist traditionally black colleges, hiring Cornell alumnus Jerome H. Holland as a consultant to the foundation.

In 1957, Pew was listed on the Fortune Magazine list of the seventy-six wealthiest Americans.

== Death and legacy ==
Pew died in 1963, and is entombed in the family mausoleum in West Laurel Hill Cemetery in Bala Cynwyd, Pennsylvania.
