= Joseph Newton Pew =

American businessman (1848–1912)

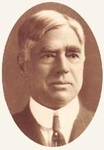
- Born: July 20, 1848; Mercer County, Pennsylvania, U.S.
- Died: October 12, 1912 (aged 64); Philadelphia, Pennsylvania, U.S.
- Occupation: Businessman
- Known for: Sun Oil

Joseph Newton Pew (July 20, 1848 – October 12, 1912) was the founder of Sun Oil Company (now Sunoco) and a prominent philanthropist.

== Early life ==
Joseph N. Pew was born in Mercer County, Pennsylvania, to John Pew and Nancy Glenn. He worked on the family's farm as a child. Pew attended public schools in Mercer and graduated from Edinboro Normal School (1866). Pew worked as a school teacher in Mercer County before he moved to Titusville. In 1874, he married Mary Anderson, who came from a family that was considered a pioneer in the oil business.

== Oil industry ==
Pew invested in Pennsylvania oil fields. With several partners, he began piping natural gas. Pew founded several petroleum-related companies and, in 1880, incorporated Sun Oil Company. Pew donated to various charities and served as the chair of the board of directors of Grove City College in Grove City, Pennsylvania. He was a member of the Presbyterian Church and the Republican Party. Pew's sons, J. Howard Pew and Joseph N. Pew Jr., took over management of the company after their father's death in 1912 and later, with their sisters, founded The Pew Charitable Trusts.

In 1881, he developed the Keystone Gas Company which used the by-products of oil, such as natural gas, to provide heat and light for the community of Bradford, Pennsylvania, a town that emerged as a wild oil boom town in the Pennsylvania oil rush in the late 19th century. The area's Pennsylvania Grade Crude Oil has superior qualities and is free of asphaltic constituents, contains only trace amounts of sulfur and nitrogen, and has excellent characteristics for refining into lubricants. By 1889 Pew's Keystone Gas Company was delivering gas to Pittsburgh.

The Haymaker Gas Well in Murrysville, Pennsylvania was the United States's first commercial natural gas well. For some time, it remained the largest commercial gas well in the world. In 1885 and 1886, individuals who established the Haymaker Gas Well moved on to Ohio and created Sunoco.

Eventually, and in partnership with E.O. Emerson, he developed the Peoples Natural Gas Company.

== Later life ==
Beginning in 1904, Pew lived in Bryn Mawr, Pennsylvania, at his estate named Glenmede, which was designed by architect William Lightfoot Price.
