= Lynn Elsenhans =

American businesswoman

Lynn Laverty Elsenhans
- Occupations: Former Chairperson, President and CEO of Sunoco, Inc.

Lynn Laverty Elsenhans is a businessperson who is the former chairperson, chief executive officer, and president of Sunoco.

== Career ==
Lynn Elsenhans served as the Sunoco's chairperson and as the company's chief executive officer and president until 2012. Since October 2008, she is also the chairwoman of Sunoco Partners LLC. Prior to joining Sunoco, Elsenhans served as the executive vice president of global manufacturing for Shell Downstream Inc., a subsidiary of Royal Dutch Shell Group for more than 28 years.

Elsenhans also served on Baker Hughes's board of directors from 2012 to July 2017 and currently sits on the board of GlaxoSmithKline.

In April 2018, she was the first woman to be appointed as board member in the state-run Saudi Aramco.

Elsenhans was voted number 10 on Forbes' 2009 "The 100 Most Powerful Women" list.

== Compensation ==
While CEO of Sunoco in 2008, Elsenhans earned a total compensation of $12,062,024, which included a base salary of $515,077, a cash bonus of $794,007, stock granted of $8,313,716, and options granted of $2,265,934.

== Education ==
Lynn Laverty Elsenhans received a B.A. degree in applied mathematics from Rice University. She played on Rice's first women's basketball team. However, the team went 0–11 in its first season. She donated $5 million to start the university's women's golf program slated to start in 2026.

Elsenhans later received an MBA degree from Harvard Business School.

== See also ==
- Sunoco
