= J. Howard Pew =

American businessman and philanthropist (1882–1971)

Howard Pew
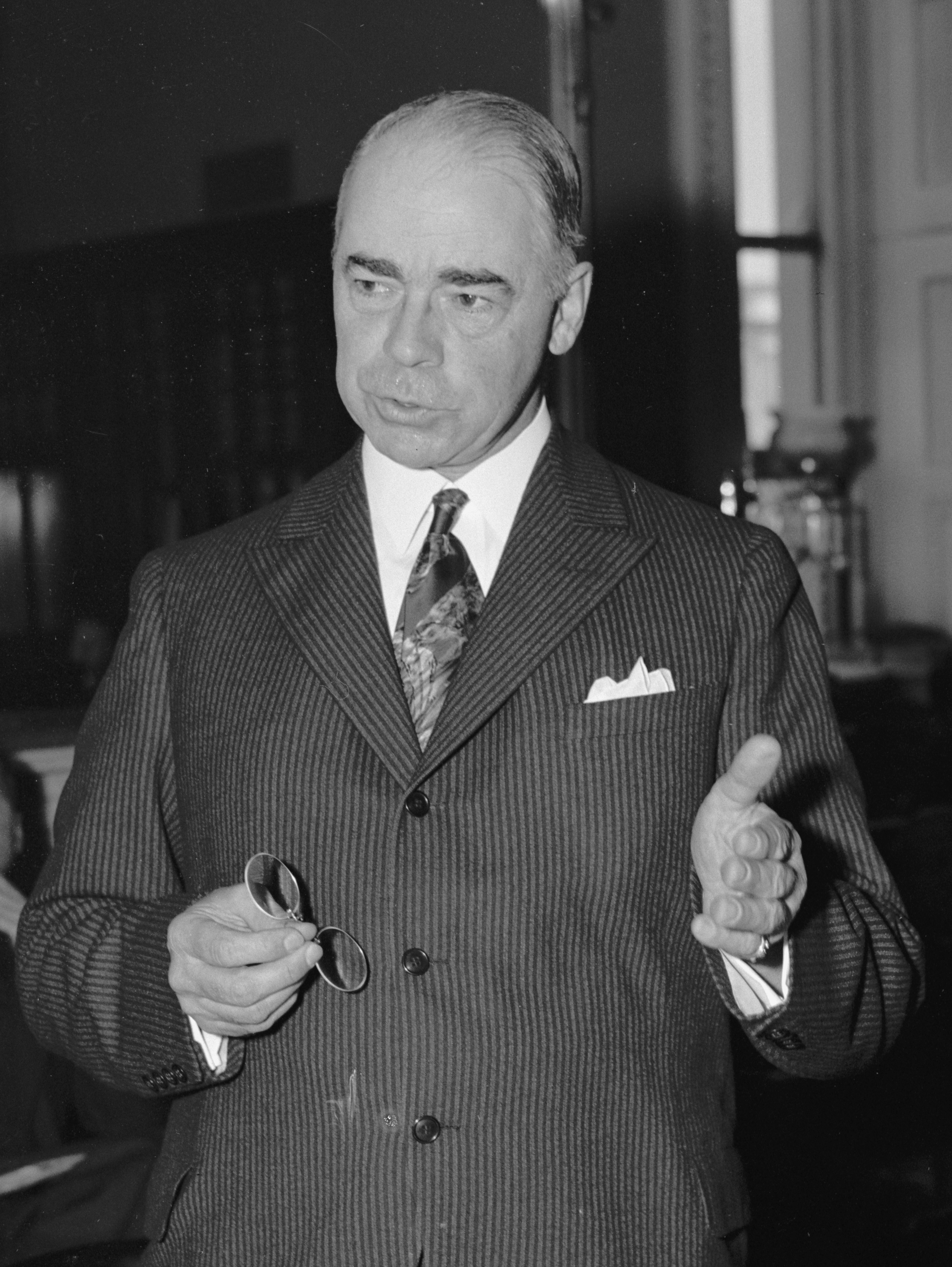
- Pew in 1938
- Born: John Howard Pew; January 27, 1882; Bradford, Pennsylvania, U.S.
- Died: November 27, 1971 (aged 89); Ardmore, Pennsylvania, U.S.
- Resting place: West Laurel Hill Cemetery
- Education: Grove City College; Massachusetts Institute of Technology

John Howard Pew (January 27, 1882 – November 27, 1971) was an American philanthropist and president of Sunoco (Sun Oil Company).

== Biography ==
J. Howard Pew was born in Bradford, Pennsylvania, in 1882 and raised as a devout Presbyterian. In 1886 Pew's father, Joseph Newton Pew, Sr. (1848–1912) started an oil business in Pennsylvania, expanding to Texas when oil was discovered near Beaumont in 1901. This company became known as the Sun Oil Company. J. Howard Pew attended Shady Side Academy, Grove City College, and Massachusetts Institute of Technology and then worked as a refinery engineer for one of his father's companies. In 1912 with his brother Joseph N. Pew, Jr., J. Howard Pew took over management of the Sun Oil Company (now known as Sunoco), improving the company's refining, marketing and distribution systems, and buying or developing energy production operations. In 1934, he purchased and reorganized the Chilton Company, a publisher of several national magazines. Pew held a number of significant leadership roles in the National Association of Manufacturers (NAM). He was an early sponsor and director of Christianity Today from 1956 until his death. He was a member of the Mont Pelerin Society.

== Athabasca Oil Sands ==
In a 2013 address to the Canadian Association of Lifelong Learners, Peter McKenzie-Brown of the Petroleum History Society listed industrialist J. Howard Pew as one of the six visionaries who built the oil sands, along with chemist Karl Clark; Premier Ernest Manning; US corporate executive Frank Spragins; Premier Peter Lougheed; and Suncor's former chairman and CEO Rick George.

With Pew's support, in 1962 Sun Oil's majority-owned subsidiary, Great Canadian Oil Sands (GCOS), filed an application for a commercial oil sands project in Canada – the first ever constructed. In 1967, Pew told his audience at opening ceremonies for the Great Canadian Oil Sands plant that "No nation can long be secure in this atomic age unless it be amply supplied with petroleum... It is the considered opinion of our group that if the North American continent is to produce the oil to meet its requirements in the years ahead, oil from the Athabasca area must of necessity play an important role." Today, GCOS is known as the Suncor oilsands plant.

He was awarded the Vermilye Medal in 1950.

== Personal life ==
Pew married Helen Jennings Thompson. She died in 1963. They had a son, George T. Pew, and two daughters.

J. Howard Pew died in Ardmore, Pennsylvania, on November 27, 1971.

== Views and philanthropy ==
With his siblings, Pew was a co-founder of The Pew Charitable Trusts. J. Howard Pew also donated the funds for the J. Howard Pew Freedom Trust in 1957. Pew donated to and worked with a number of conservative political organizations and religious figures. History scholar James McKay argues that Pew helped forge a link between evangelicalism and conservative politics: "For [evangelicals such as Pew], spreading the gospel of economic individualism was spreading the Christian message; one would eventually lead to the other"; Pew had close links to the National Association of Evangelicals and also "provided a direct connection at the highest levels between [the Foundation for Economic Education] and evangelicalism." He provided early funding to support Gordon-Conwell Theological Seminary in Massachusetts, working closely with Billy Graham and Harold Ockenga to start Christianity Today. Pew also donated to organizations including the Foundation for Economic Education (FEE), American Liberty League, James W. Fifield Jr.'s Spiritual Mobilization religious-political organization, and Barry Goldwater's 1964 presidential campaign. Pew also made a one-time $1000 gift to the Liberty Lobby.

Through their membership in the National Association of Manufacturers, Pew and DuPont CEO Jasper Crane became friends and found a commonality in their shared belief in "the inherent Christianity of unfettered capitalism"; both served on FEE's board of trustees. Believing that clergy were the prime promoters of socialism and communism, Pew identified closely with Spiritual Mobilization's goals and began to focus his own efforts on influencing clergy politically. In 1950, Pew founded the libertarian Christian Freedom Foundation (CFF) together with Howard Kershner to promote social and economic conservatism among clergy. Within several years, Pew saw the need to also promote theological conservatism and began working with Billy Graham and Harold Ockenga to support the founding of Christianity Today magazine. By the mid-1970s, the struggling CFF was taken over by Bill Bright and John Conlan as a non-profit to receive donations for their Third Century Publishing, and was headed by Christian right pioneer Ed McAteer.

Although Pew denied being a member of the John Birch Society, he was listed a member of the editorial advisory board of the group's publication, American Opinion, and as a stockholder of Robert Welch, Inc., the group's publishing arm. Pew had been invited to the organization's founding meeting by founder Robert Welch, a fellow member of NAM, but was unable to attend. He was hesitant to support the JBS strongly due to Welch's lack of shared views on the importance of Christianity, but Pew continued contact and support of Welch for a time.
