= Religious views on capitalism =

Philosophical topic

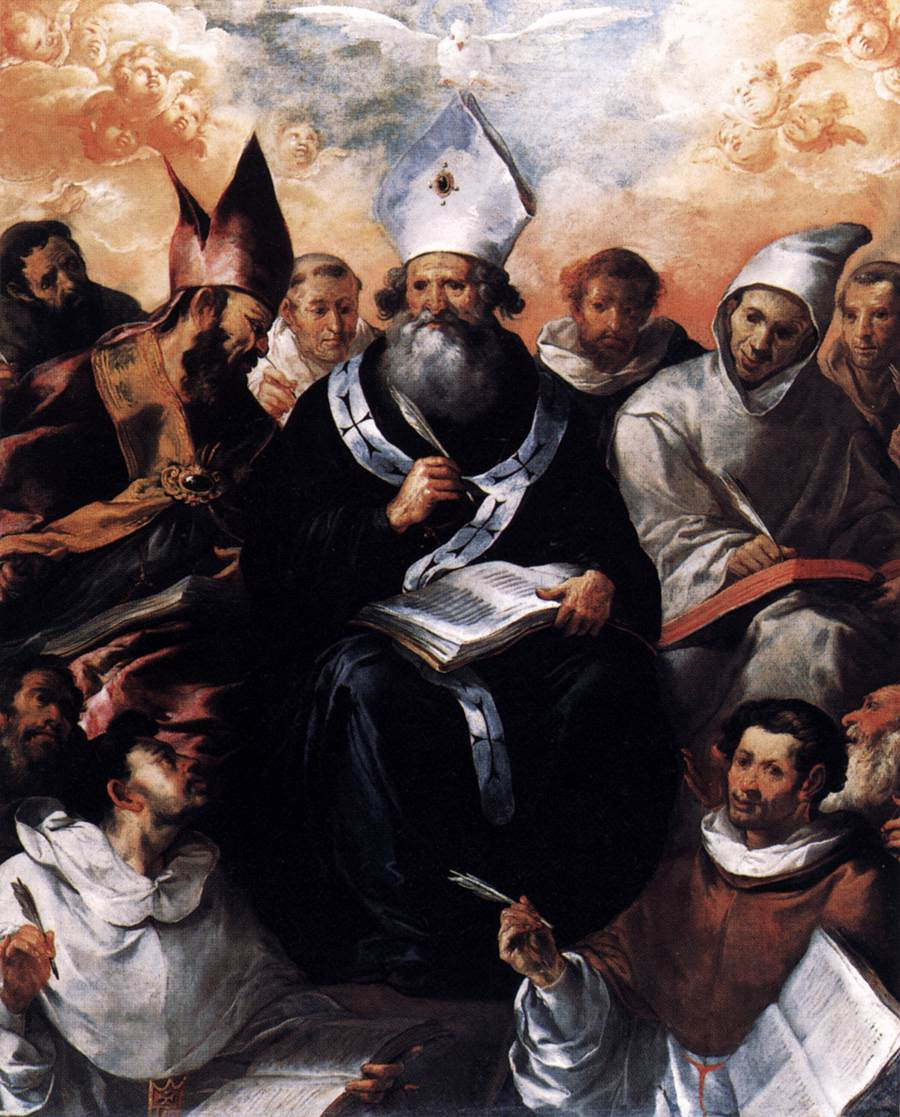
Religious Philosophers

Religious views on capitalism have been philosophically diverse. Numerous religious philosophers have defended the natural right to property while simultaneously expressing criticism of the negative social effects of materialism and greed.

== Christian views ==
=== Christian socialism ===
The first socialists drew many of their principles from Christian values against the capitalist values of profiteering, greed, selfishness and hoarding. Christian socialism is a branch of socialism based on the Bible, church teaching, and the sacraments. Liberation theology is a school of theology within Christianity, particularly in the Catholic Church. It emphasizes the Christian mission to bring justice to the poor and oppressed, particularly through political activism. Its theologians consider sin the root source of poverty, the sin in question being exploitative capitalism and class war by the rich against the poor. In the United States, the Social Gospel was pursued in response to increased ideas of capitalist ideas and social Darwinism, calling for the protection of people against perceived threats from industrialization.

== Muslim views ==
=== Legislation against riba ===
Usury or riba is prohibited, and religious law encourages the use of capital to spur economic activity while placing the burden of risk and the benefit of profit on the owner of the capital. A 2.5% alms tax (zakat) is levied on all gold, crops, and cattle.

=== Opposition in Egypt and Iran ===
Sayyid Qutb denounced capitalism in The Battle Between Islam and Capitalism, published in 1951. The Islamic constitution of Iran, which predominantly Islamic clerics drafted (see the Assembly of Experts), dispraises the "materialist schools of thought" that encourage "concentration and accumulation of wealth and maximization of profit". Malcolm X was also critical of capitalism.
