= Sunoco =

American energy company

Sunoco LP
- Logo used from 1999
- Type: Public
- Traded as: NYSE: SUN
- Industry: Oil and gas
- Founded: 1886; 140 years ago
- Founders: Joseph Newton Pew; Edward O. Emerson
- Headquarters: Dallas, Texas, U.S.
- Key people: Joseph Kim (president & CEO); Karl Fails (executive VP, COO); Brian Hand (executive VP, chief sales officer); Austin Harkness (executive VP, CCO); Dylan Bramhall (CFO)
- Products: Gasoline; diesel fuel; ATF; heating oil; lubricants; kerosene; propane; substances; DEF; gasoline additives; fuel cards; ethanol; renewable fuels; asphalt; ammonia; butane; petroleum
- Revenue: ▲US$25.201 billion (2025)
- Net income: ▼US$0.527 billion (2025)
- Total assets: ▲US$28.362 billion (2025)
- Total equity: ▲US$8.009 billion (2025)
- Number of employees: 8,910 (2025)
- Website: www.sunoco.com; www.sunocolp.com

Sunoco LP /səˈnoʊkoʊ/ is an American vehicle gasoline master limited partnership company organized under Delaware state law and headquartered in Dallas, Texas. Dating back to 1886, the company has transformed from a vertically integrated energy company to a distributor of fuels and operator of energy infrastructure. It was previously engaged in oil, natural gas exploration and production, refining, chemical manufacturing, and retail fuel sales, but divested these businesses.

The partnership was known as Sun Oil Company from 1890 to 1976, and as Sun Company Inc. from 1976 to 1998. The Sunoco name is a contraction of SUN Oil COmpany.

Its current operational focus dates back to 2018, when it divested the non–core convenience store operations to 7-Eleven for $3.2 billion, which allowed for Sunoco LP to improve its financial position. The transaction also provided a long-term take or pay fuel supply agreement with 7-Eleven to generate consistent earnings and cash flows. As of 2024, Sunoco still operates 76 retail locations, all of which are located in New Jersey and Hawaii, the latter branded as Aloha Petroleum, Ltd..

As of 2024, the company distributes over 8 billion U.S. gallons (30 billion liters) of fuel across more than 40 U.S. states and territories, making it one of the largest independent fuel distributors in the United States. Its midstream operations include a network of approximately 14,000 miles (23,000 km) of pipeline and over 100 terminals. It has by far the largest number of gas stations in Pennsylvania at over 800 locations, more than triple that of second-place ExxonMobil, though it is second to convenience store chain Sheetz in total fuel sales in the state.

== History ==
=== 1800s to 1950s: founding and growth ===
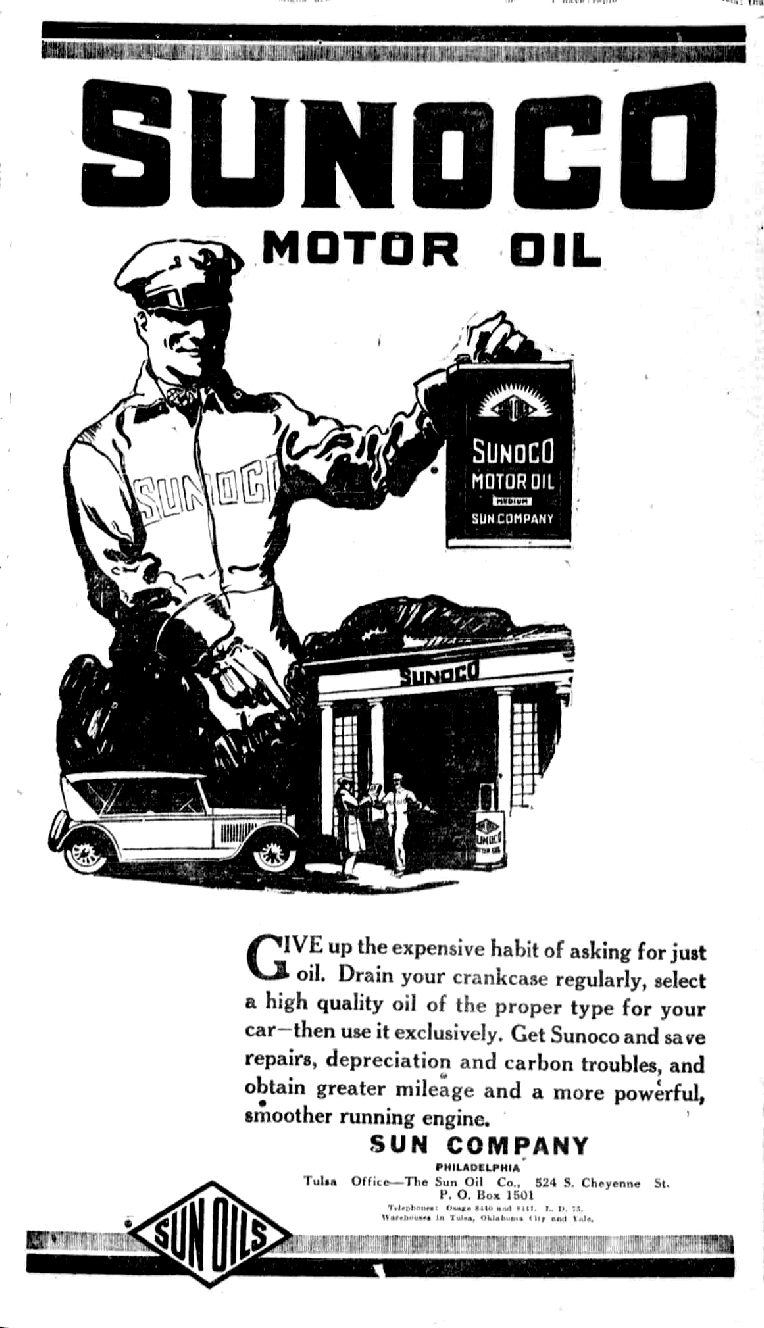
Newspaper ad for Sunoco motor oil, then known as The Sun Oil Co. Tulsa Daily World (November 1, 1922).

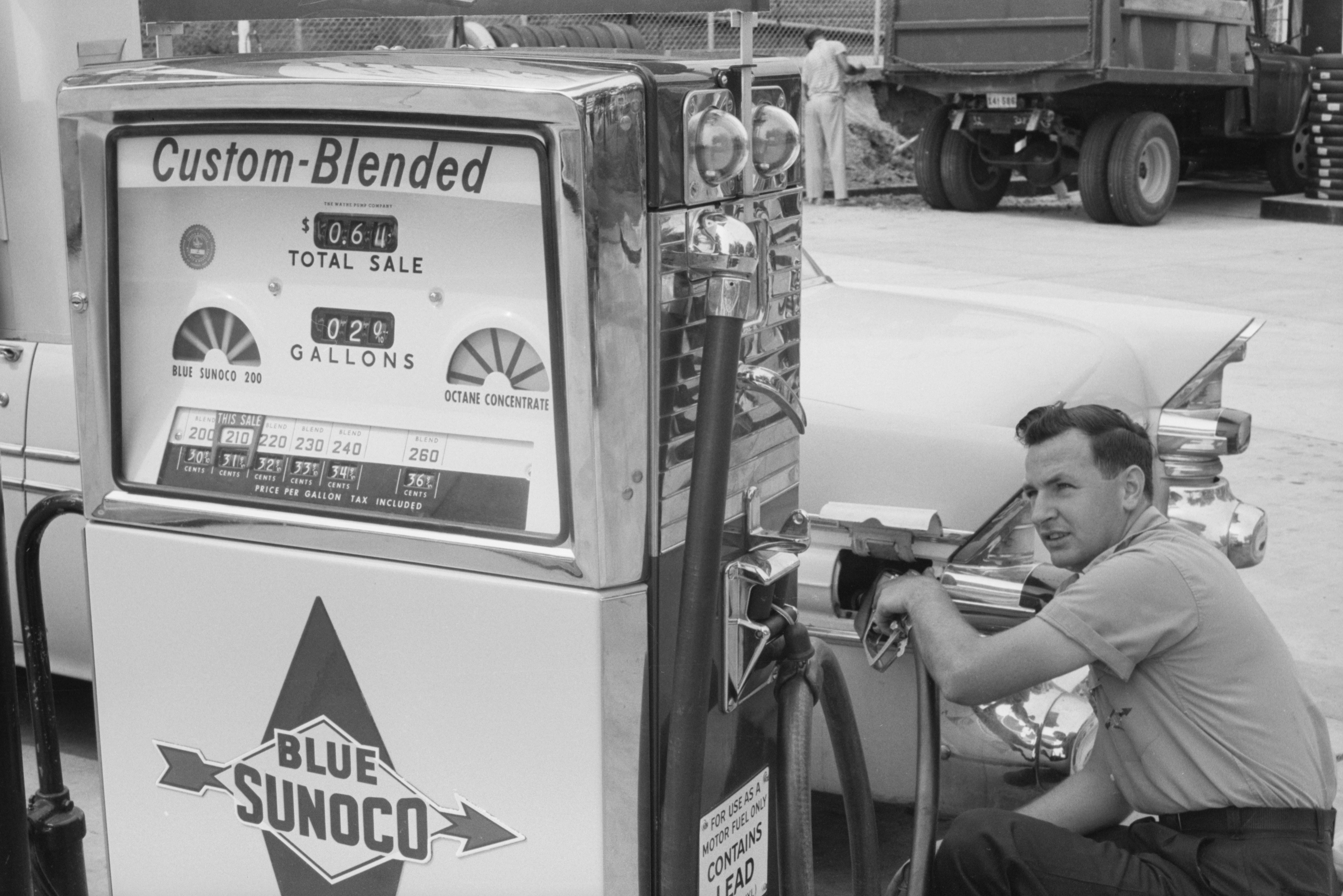
Sunoco attendant filling a car with leaded gas near Washington D.C. in 1958

The partnership began as The Peoples Natural Gas Company in Pittsburgh, Pennsylvania. In 1886, its partners – Joseph Newton Pew, Philip Pisano, and Edward O. Emerson – decided to expand their fuel business with a stake in the new oil discoveries in Ohio and Pennsylvania. Four years later, the growing enterprise became the Sun Oil Company of Ohio. Sun Oil diversified quickly and became active in the production and distribution of oil as well as processing and marketing refined products. By 1901, the company was incorporated in New Jersey as Sun Company, Inc.

In 1902, the Sun Oil Refining Company was chartered in Texas, as it turned its interest to the new Spindletop field in Texas. Joseph Newton Pew's nephew, J. Edgar Pew, was able to buy the storage and transportation assets of Lone Star and Crescent Oil Company at a receivership auction. Spindletop oil was then shipped to the company's Marcus Hook, Pennsylvania, refinery.

Pew's sons, J. Howard Pew and Joseph N. Pew Jr. would take over the company after their father's death.

With a growing portfolio of oil fields and refineries, Sun opened its first service station in Ardmore, Pennsylvania, in 1920. In 1922, it changed its name back to Sun Oil Company and, in 1925, it became a public company via an initial public offering on the New York Stock Exchange. Sun Oil ranked 39th among United States corporations in the value of World War II production contracts. The company expanded internationally following the war. Its first Canadian refinery was built in 1953 in Sarnia, Ontario, home to a burgeoning new petrochemical industry. Sun Oil established a facility at Venezuela's Lake Maracaibo in 1957, which produced over a billion barrels (159 trillion liters) before the operation was nationalized in 1975.

In 1956, the company introduced "Custom–Blended" fuel pumps, an innovation that allowed customers of Sunoco service stations to choose from several octane ratings through a single pump. Sunoco stations offered as many as eight grades of "Custom–Blended" fuels from its "Dial A Grade/Blend Selector" pumps ranging from subregular Sunoco 190 to Sunoco 260 and super-premium grade of 102 octane. The Sunoco 260 was advertised as "The Highest Octane Fuel You Can Buy!" and very popular with operators of V8–powered muscle cars of the 1960s.

=== 1960s to 1990s: acquisitions and branding ===
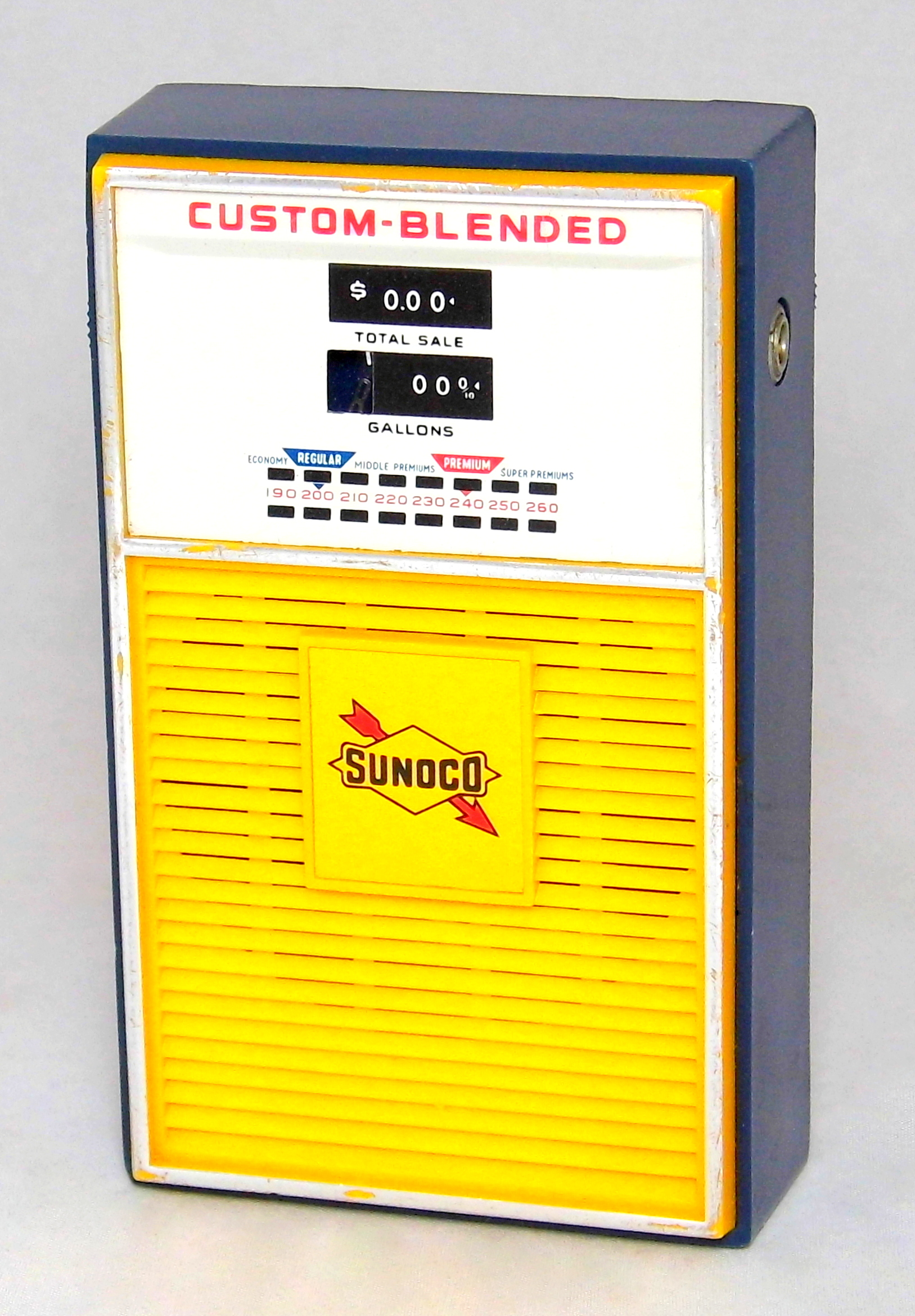
Sunoco Custom–Blended fuel pump replica transistor radio

In 1967, Sun Oil established its Great Canadian Oil Sands Limited facility in northern Alberta, Canada to access the estimated 300 billion barrels (48 km^{3}) of extractable oil in the Athabasca oil sands.

In 1968, Sun Oil merged with Tulsa, Oklahoma–based Sunray DX Oil Company, which refined and marketed fuel under the DX brand in several midwestern states, and included several refineries. Its Tulsa refinery was operated by the company until its sale in June 2009 to Holly Corporation of Dallas. This move expanded Sun Oil's marketing area into the mid–continent region.

The company continued marketing its petroleum products under both the Sunoco and DX brands through the 1970s and into the 1980s. In the late 1980s, it began rebranding DX stations in the Midwest to the Sunoco brand, but by the early 1990s, they pulled out of virtually all areas in the southeastern U.S. and west of the Mississippi, resulting in the closing and rebranding of service stations and jobbers to other brands in those areas, notably Sinclair in Oklahoma and Kerr-McGee and Chevron in Arkansas.

With increased diversification, Sun Oil Company was renamed Sun Company in 1976. In 1980, Sun acquired the U.S. oil and gas properties of Texas Pacific Oil Company, Inc., a subsidiary of The Seagram Company Ltd, for U.S.$2.3 billion – the second largest acquisition in U.S. history to that date.

Through the 1980s, Sun developed oil interests in the North Sea and offshore China and expanded its holdings in both oil and coal with additional U.S. business acquisitions. In 1983, the company launched Sunoco ULTRA 94, the market's highest octane unleaded fuel. Then in 1988, Sun undertook a restructuring to segregate its domestic oil and fuel exploration and production business and focus the company on its refining and marketing business. This led to the acquisition of Atlantic Refining and Marketing (and, in effect, that company's convenience store chain, A–Plus), including its Philadelphia refinery which was later merged with the former Gulf Oil refinery that Sunoco acquired from Chevron.

By the 1990s, the company had departed the international exploration business and was fully dedicated to its branded products and services. In 1994, Sun acquired the Philadelphia Chevron Oil refinery consolidating operations with its own adjacent which it had acquired with Atlantic. It sold its remaining interest in Canada's Suncor Energy in 1995 but markets products from two refineries – one in Toledo, Ohio, and the other Sarnia, Ontario – in joint ventures. In 1998, Sun Company, Inc. became Sunoco, Inc. In 2011 the Toledo facility was sold to PBF Energy, Inc.

In 1998, Sunoco acquired the chemical business of Allied Signal, including a phenol plant. The business was renamed as "Sunoco Chemicals, Inc." In 2011, the plant was acquired by Honeywell for $85 million.

=== 2000s ===
In 2003, Speedway LLC, then a subsidiary of Marathon Petroleum, sold 193 convenience stores to Sunoco. It also acquired service stations from Coastal Petroleum.

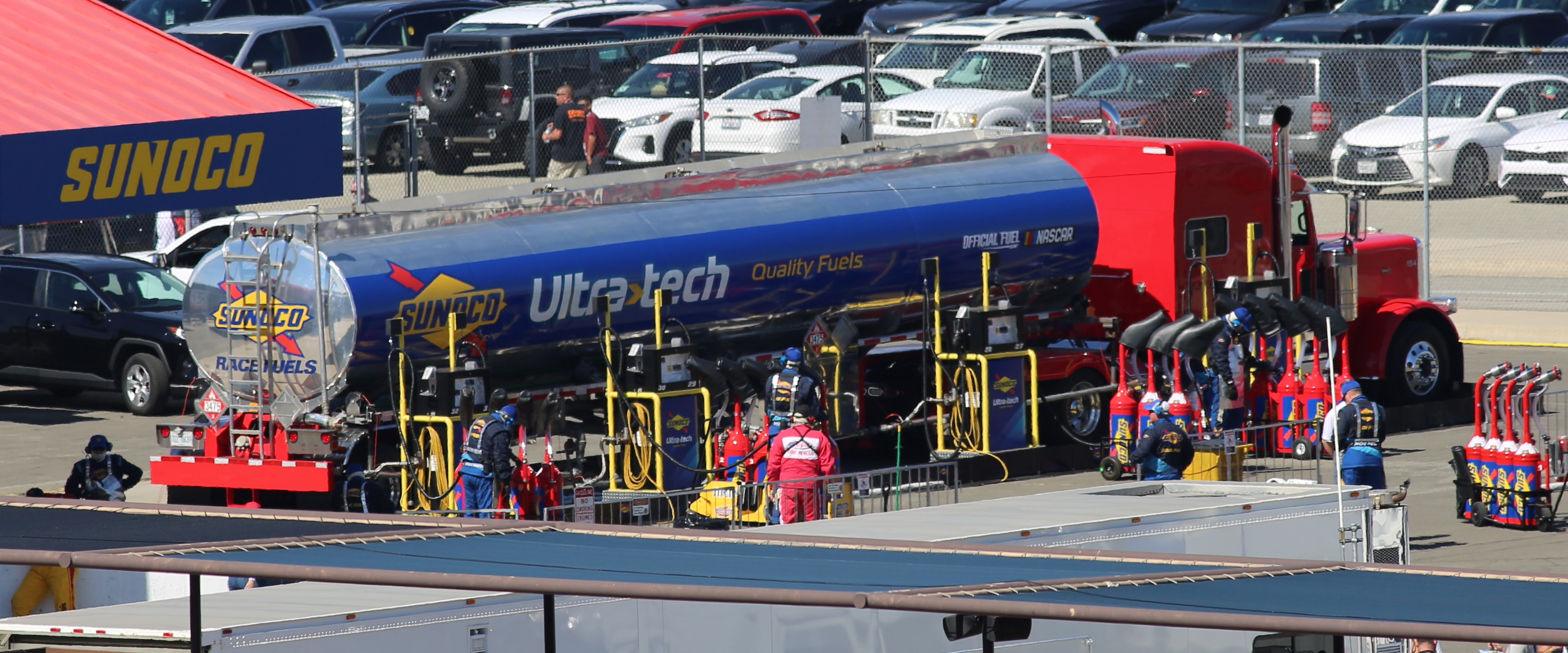
Sunoco UltraTech race fuel tanker truck at Auto Club Speedway

In 2004, Sunoco replaced the ConocoPhillips' 76 brand as the Official Fuel of NASCAR.

After ConocoPhillips abandoned the marketing of the Mobil brand name in the Washington, D.C. area, Sunoco purchased these rights, converted Maryland and Virginia Mobil stations to the Sunoco brand, bringing the A–Plus convenience store with them – prior to this, these stations had convenience stores under the Circle K or On the Run brands.

In September 2009, Sunoco sold its retail heating oil and propane distribution business to Superior Plus for $82.5 million in cash.

In Canada, the Sunoco brand was used for the Ontario retail fuel station operations of former affiliate Suncor Energy until 2010; Suncor held (and continues to hold) the "Sunoco" trademarks for gasoline outright in Canada. Following Suncor's acquisition of Petro-Canada, all Canadian Sunoco outlets were converted to Petro-Canada branding, except for one location in North Bay, Ontario.

In December 2010, Sunoco sold its refinery in Toledo, Ohio, to PBF Energy, Inc. for $400 million. Effective September 6, 2011, Sunoco announced that it would exit the crude oil refining business and seek to sell its Philadelphia and Marcus Hook, Pennsylvania refineries by mid-2012. The company stated that its cost for exiting the refining business could be as high as $2.7 billion. According to one report, it had lost some $800 million on refining operations since 2009; an earlier report provided a figure of $772 million.

On December 1, 2011, Sunoco announced it would accelerate closure of the Marcus Hook facility. The Marcus Hook facility, founded in 1902 and covering 781 acres, was dedicated exclusively to the processing of light sweet crude oil; this processing focus combined with volatility in crude oil prices are considered contributing factors to both this refinery's closure and Sunoco's exit from the refinery business.

In 2012, Sunoco demolished its Eagle Point refinery complex in West Deptford Township, New Jersey, which had been idle since 2010.

In September 2012, Sunoco formed a joint venture with The Carlyle Group, allowing for the continuation of operations at the Philadelphia refinery, and temporarily saving over 800 jobs. However, on January 22, 2018, the joint venture, named Philadelphia Energy Solutions, filed for bankruptcy.

=== Environmental record ===
On June 21, 2019, a damaging fire occurred at a 30,000 bpcd (barrels per calendar day) alkylation unit in Philadelphia. The explosion of the alkylation unit triggered a massive fireball and caused nearby homes to shake. A few days later, on June 26 the refinery complex announced it would cease operations and shut down.

In 2014, Sunoco was one of 50 companies sued by Pennsylvania, which alleged that the companies polluted waters with MTBE, a fuel additive.

In 2000, Sunoco leaked 190,000 US gallons (720,000 L) of oil into the John Heinz National Wildlife Refuge at Tinicum in Pennsylvania, through a cracked pipe. Sunoco claimed its systems did not detect the leak, which was reported by a hiker in the Wildlife Refuge. The company installed advanced leak detection systems after removing the defective joints on that and associated pipelines.

In 1993, Sunoco became the first Fortune 500 company to endorse the CERES principles (Coalition for Environmentally Responsible Economies). The 10–point conduct code includes public reporting of environmental record.

=== Purchase by Energy Transfer Partners and creation of Sunoco LP as master limited partnership ===
Sunoco LP logo

In 2012, Dallas–based energy company Energy Transfer Partners purchased Sunoco. Sunoco would subsequently move its corporate headquarters to Dallas in 2016.

On August 29, 2014, Energy Transfer Partners acquired Susser Holdings Corporation, owner of Stripes Convenience Stores and general partner of Susser Petroleum Partners LP (SUSP). On October 27, 2014, Susser Petroleum Partners LP changed its name to Sunoco LP and its ticker symbol from SUSP to SUN. From 2014 to 2016, Energy Transfer Partners sold the combined retail and marketing assets of Sunoco and Susser Holdings to Sunoco LP.

In Texas, Sunoco replaced Valero at the Stripes locations; Stripes and A–Plus remained separate brands.

=== Current operation: focus on fuel distribution and energy infrastructure ===
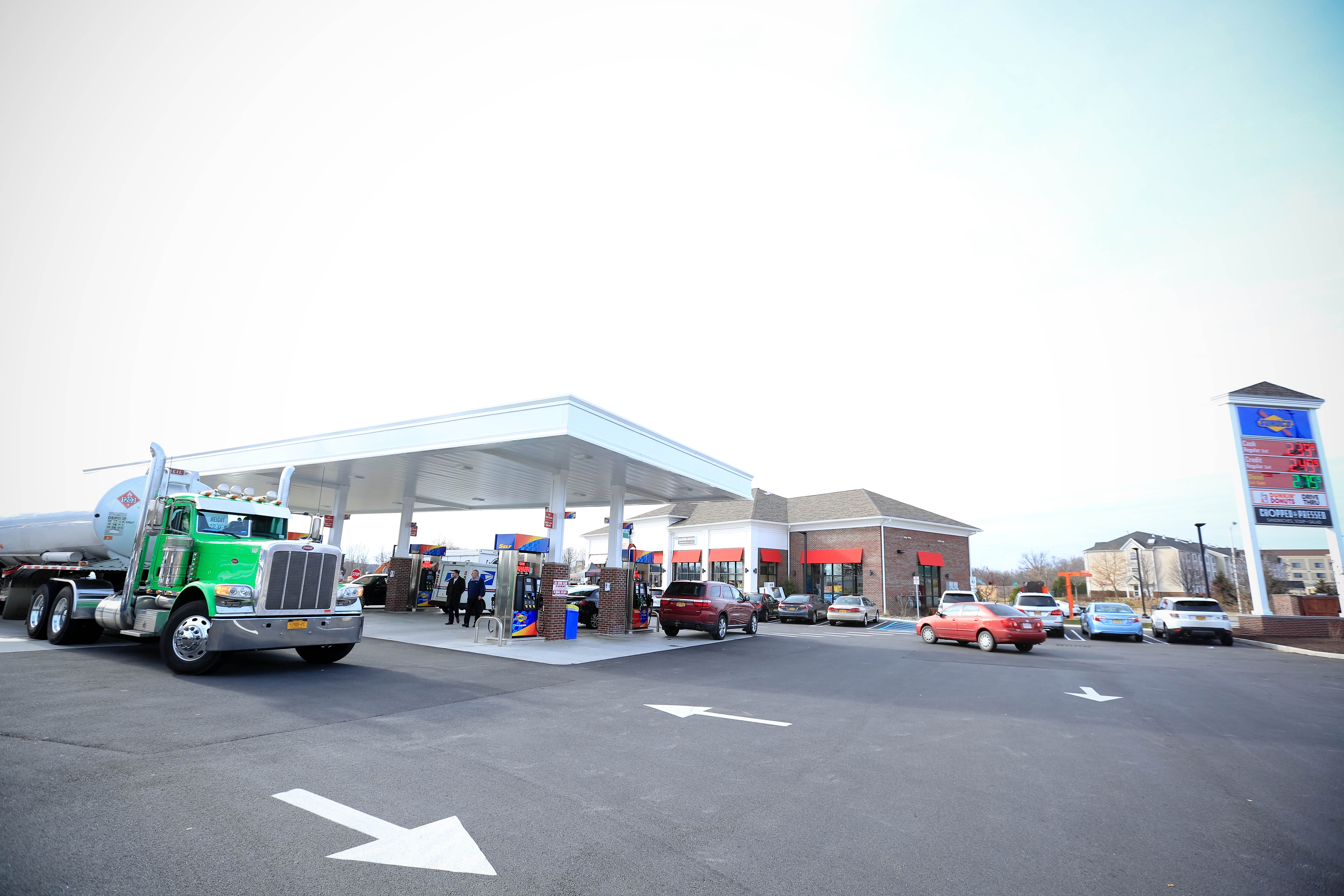
Sunoco fuel station in Middletown, New York operated by Gas Land Petroleum, Inc.

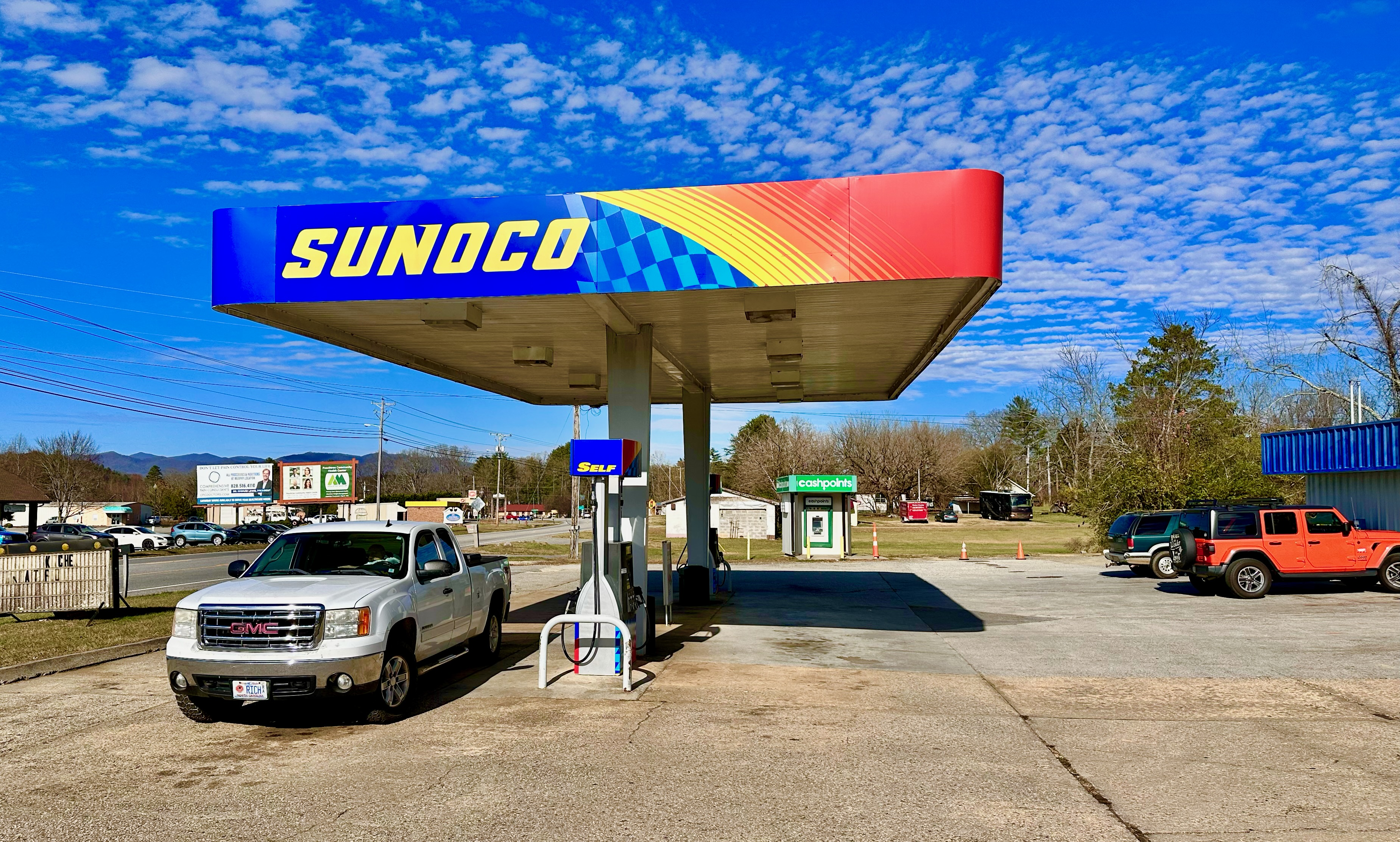
A Sunoco fuel station in Peachtree, North Carolina

Also in 2014, Sunoco LP acquired Aloha Petroleum, Ltd., a retail and wholesale fuel business with six terminals in Hawaii. Additionally, it purchased eight Pico convenience stores in south central Texas. In December 2015, the company completed its acquisition of Alta East, Inc., a wholesale motor fuel distribution business serving the northeast United States. In 2015, Aloha Petroleum, Ltd. acquired stores including a Subway in Hawaii.

In June 2016, Sunoco LP purchased Valentine Convenience stores, consisting of 18 locations selling more than 20 million gallons of fuel, as well as Texas–based Kolkhorst Petroleum, Inc. Kolkhorst operated 14 convenience stores under the Rattler's brand and distributed more than 46 million gallons of fuel. Denny Oil, a convenience store and wholesale distributor operator, was purchased by Sunoco LP in October 2016, adding an additional 90 million gallons of fuel to its distribution business.

Sunoco diversified its portfolio in August 2016 with the acquisition of Emerge Energy Services LP, entering into the business of processing transmix fuels.

In April 2017, Sunoco introduced at all of its stations Sunoco UltraTech, a high-detergent fuel blend that met Top Tier standards. Sunoco UltraTech contains the same detergent level as the fuel Sunoco makes for NASCAR.

In January 2018, the company sold 1,030 retail stores to 7-Eleven and agreed to supply 2.2 billion gallons of fuel to 7–Eleven convenience stores annually for 15 years. This included Sunoco's contract to the service plazas along the Pennsylvania Turnpike. Sunoco LP announced the completion of the acquisition of the refined terminal business from American Midstream Partners, LP on December 20, 2018.

On April 2, 2018, Sunoco announced the completion of the conversion of its 207 retail sites located in central west Texas, Oklahoma, and New Mexico markets to a single commission agent, Cal's Convenience, Inc. That month also saw the acquisition of Superior Plus Energy Services, adding three terminals and approximately 200 million gallons to Sunoco LP's wholesale fuels business. Additional 2018 acquisitions included Sandford Energy, LLC., BRENCO Marketing Corp., and Schmitt Sales, Inc.

In 2019, Sunoco LP announced a 50 percent ownership joint venture with Energy Transfer on the J.C. Nolan diesel fuel pipeline that connects west Texas to the Gulf Coast. On January 18, 2019, Sunoco LP announced the execution of a definitive asset purchase agreement with Attis Industries, Inc. for the sale of Sunoco LP's ethanol plant, including the grain malting operation in Fulton, New York.

In 2021, the company expanded its midstream footprint with the construction of a terminal in Brownsville, Texas along with the purchase of a terminal in Maryland from Cato Incorporated and eight terminals in Illinois, Maryland, Florida, New Jersey, and Virginia from NuStar Energy LP.

In 2022, Sunoco acquired Gladieux Capital Partners, LLC, a transmix plant in Indiana that included a wholesale fuel business, and Peerless Oil & Chemicals, a terminal and wholesale fuel business in Puerto Rico.

In May 2023, the company completed the acquisition of 16 refined product terminals located across the East Coast and Midwest from Zenith Energy.

In January 2024, Sunoco announced the sale of 204 convenience stores in New Mexico, Oklahoma, and West Texas to 7-Eleven for $1.0 billion.

On March 13, 2024, Sunoco LP announced its acquisition of Zenith Energy Netherlands Amsterdam B.V., which included liquid fuels terminals in Amsterdam, Netherlands, and Bantry Bay, Ireland.

On May 3, 2024, Sunoco LP acquired NuStar Energy LP for $7.3 billion. As reported by J.P. Morgan analysts, the acquisition “represented a transformative shift in strategy to a more diversified and vertically integrated business.” Assets added in the acquisition included a network of approximately 9,500 miles of pipeline and 63 terminals.

In July 2024, Sunoco LP announced the formation of a joint venture with Energy Transfer to combine their crude oil and produced water-gathering assets in the Permian Basin. The joint venture now operates more than 5,000 miles of crude oil and water gathering pipelines along with crude oil storage capacity of over 11 million barrels. Energy Transfer holds a 67.5% interest in the joint venture, with Sunoco LP holding the remaining 32.5% interest.

In August 2024, the company acquired a liquid fuels terminal in Portland, Maine.

On March 12, 2025, Sunoco LP expanded its presence in Europe by acquiring TanQuid, Germany's largest independent terminal operator with a portfolio of 15 terminals located in Germany and one terminal located in Southwestern Poland. This infrastructure serves an important role in the European fuel distribution supply chain.

On October 31, 2025, Sunoco LP announced that it had closed on its acquisition of Canadian fuel distributor and retailer Parkland Corporation in a cash and equity deal valued at $9.1 billion, making Sunoco the largest independent fuel distributor in the Americas, with over 11,000 retail locations. The company also became owner of the Burnaby Refinery.

As part of the transaction, Sunoco formed a new publicly traded Delaware limited liability company named SunocoCorp LLC (NYSE: SUNC). SunocoCorp holds limited partnership units of Sunoco that are economically equivalent to Sunoco's publicly traded common units on the basis of one Sunoco common unit for each outstanding SunocoCorp unit. This new publicly traded entity is treated as a corporation for tax purposes.

== Partnerships ==
Sunoco has exclusive deals as the fuel supplier at the travel plazas along the Ohio Turnpike, Pennsylvania Turnpike, New Jersey Turnpike, Garden State Parkway, Atlantic City Expressway, Palisades Parkway, and Delaware Turnpike.

Sunoco also operates some of the fuel filling stations on the New York Thruway, as well as the two service areas – Chesapeake House, and Maryland House – along Interstate 95 in Maryland.

== Leadership ==
=== President/CEO ===
1. Joseph Newton Pew, 1886–1912
2. J. Howard Pew, 1912–1947
3. Robert G. Dunlop, 1947–1970
4. H. Robert Sharbaugh, 1970–1976
5. Theodore A. Burtis, 1976–1981
6. Robert McClements Jr., 1981–1987
7. Robert P. Hauptfuhrer, 1987–1988
8. Robert McClements Jr., 1988–1991
9. Robert H. Campbell, 1991–1996
10. John G. Drosdick, 1996–2008
11. Lynn L. Elsenhans, 2008–2012
12. Brian P. MacDonald, 2012
13. Robert W. Owens, 2012–2017
14. Joseph Kim, 2018–

=== Chairman of the Board ===
1. Joseph Newton Pew Jr., 1947–1963
2. J. Howard Pew, 1963–1971
3. Robert G. Dunlop, 1971–1974
4. H. Robert Sharbaugh, 1975–1979
5. Theodore A. Burtis, 1979–1987
6. Robert McClements Jr., 1987–1992
7. Robert H. Campbell, 1992–2000
8. John G. Drosdick, 2000–2008
9. Lynn L. Elsenhans, 2009–201
10. Sam L. Susser, 2014–2015
11. Matthew S. Ramsey, 2015–2022
12. Ray W. Washburne, 2022–

== Fuel brands ==
=== Sunoco Performance Fuels ===
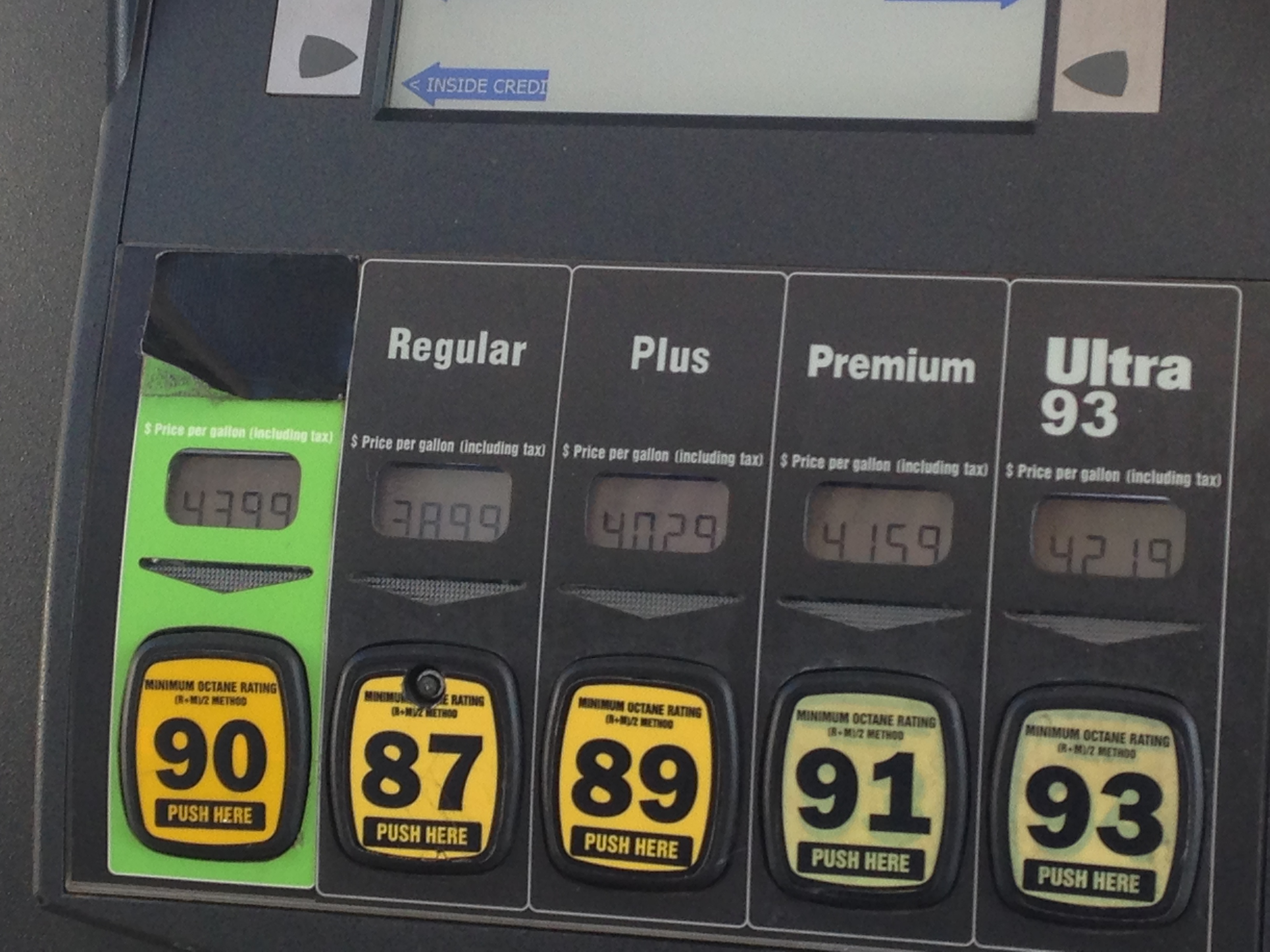
Sunoco fuel pump with five octane ratings

As of 2017, Sunoco's full lineup of fuels meets both the demands of high-performance drivers and the specifications of the Top Tier Fuel Program. Its enhanced fuel detergency helps keep engines clean and ensures compliance with tight vehicle emissions requirements. Sunoco fuels all have the same level of detergency that they use to fuel NASCAR and help vehicles run cleaner, longer, and more efficiently.

=== 94 Octane ===
From 1983 to the early 2000s, 94-octane Ultra 94 was the market's highest octane of unleaded fuel. In 2021, Sunoco began to reintroduce the 94-octane fuel in specific markets.

=== Sunoco Race Fuels ===
Sunoco Race Fuels is a refiner and distributor of racing fuels. Originally featuring two high-octane options (Sunoco 260 and 280), Sunoco Race Fuels now produces 18 different high-performance fuel blends, which are used for all types of professional motorsports. All Sunoco Race Fuels products are refined at Sunoco LP's Marcus Hook facility.

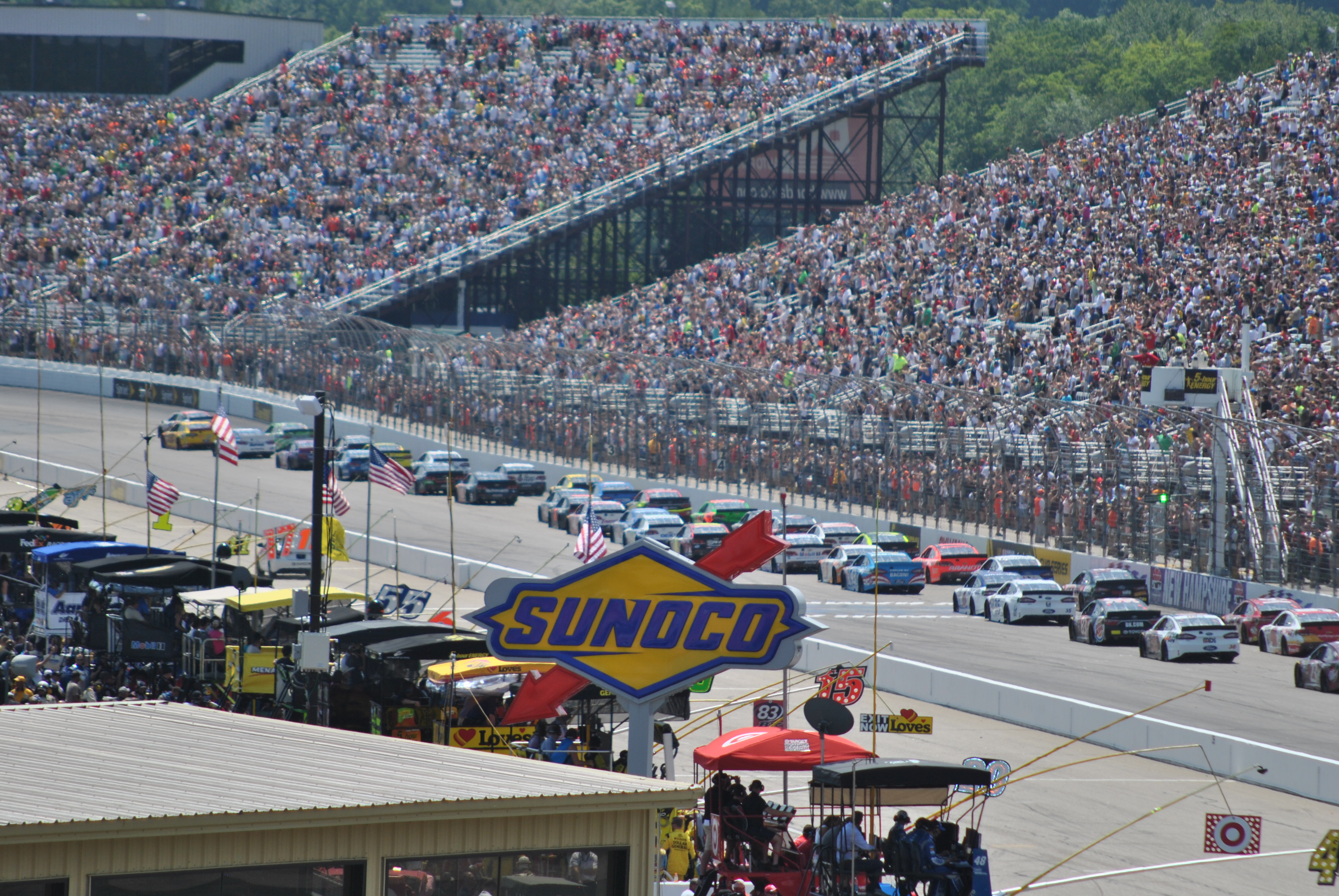
Sunoco sign at New Hampshire Motor Speedway during a NASCAR race

Sunoco Race Fuels also holds partnerships as the Official Fuel or Spec Fuel of the following racing series:

- NASCAR
- Sports Car Club of America
- International Hot Rod Association
- Pro All Stars Series
- Sportscar Vintage Racing Association
- Trans-Am Series
- ARCA Menards Series
- Lucas Oil Late Model Dirt Series

== Motorsports partnerships ==
The Sunoco fuel brand was Team Penske's sponsor of choice for many years, particularly in the Sports Car Club of America Trans-Am Series, where Roger Penske's Sunoco Camaros won the championship in 1968 and 1969. Sunoco also sponsored Penske Porsche + Audi Le Mans in the Sports Car Club of America Can-Am series, and Penske won his first Indianapolis 500 in 1972 with driver Mark Donohue.

NASCAR Whelen Modified Tour standout Charlie Rudolph made five appearances in the NASCAR Winston Cup Series (now NASCAR Cup Series) in 1987, bringing Sunoco into the sport for the first time. Between 1989 and 1992, Sunoco sponsored Hagan Racing. Sterling Marlin drove the No. 94 Sunoco Ultra94 Oldsmobile during the 1989–90 seasons and Terry Labonte for the 1991–92 seasons.

From 1995 to 1997, Sunoco was the primary sponsor of ST Motorsports No. 47 Chevrolet, driven by Jeff Fuller. Fuller captured his lone NASCAR Busch Grand National Series (now NASCAR O'Reilly Auto Parts Series) victory at Bristol Motor Speedway on August 23, 1996.

In 2003, Sunoco was named the Official Fuel of NASCAR. Starting in the 2011 NASCAR Sprint Cup Series Sunoco introduced a new race fuel Green E15 98 octane racing fuel which is still used in the NASCAR Cup Series today.

Sunoco was the Official Fuel of the NTT IndyCar Series from 2011 through 2018, and the Indianapolis Motor Speedway from 2015 through 2018. New for the 2012 IndyCar Series, Sunoco introduced a new ethanol fuel blend rate that was reduced to E85 formula in a reference of road car relevance.

In 2013, Sunoco sponsored the No. 60 Panther Racing Chevrolet in the 2013 Indianapolis 500 with driver Townsend Bell. Following their participation in that event, Sunoco partnered with KV Racing and driver Tony Kanaan, who won the 2013 Indianapolis 500, for a four-race primary sponsorship agreement.

Sunoco was the Official Fuel of the National Hot Rod Association from 2015 through 2024.

In 2016, Sunoco was the founding partner of the "Daytona Rising" project, which was highlighted by the reimagining of the historic Daytona International Speedway. The Sunoco Injector, a branded fan engagement area built as part of the new speedway section opened during the Daytona 500 weekend.

In 2017/2018, Sunoco became the Official Fuel for the Canadian Snow Cross Circuit.

In 2019, Sunoco signed on to be the presenting sponsor of the Richmond Raceway eSports Fueled By Sunoco, an eNASCAR iRacing World Championship Series team, with Malik Ray driving the No. 90 Sunoco Toyota Camry. In 2020, defending series champion Zack Novak piloted the Sunoco sponsored entry, with Jimmy Mullis as his Richmond Raceway eSports teammate in the No. 46 Toyota. In 2024, Sunoco became the sponsor of Letarte Racing.

As of 2023, Sunoco completed its 20th season as the Official Fuel of NASCAR.

In 2024, the company announced a two-year agreement with Sauber Motorsport to sponsor its Formula 1 racing team.

In December 2025, Chip Ganassi Racing and the company signed a multi-year partnership, with Sunoco sponsoring the team's No. 8 IndyCar Series entry beginning in 2026.

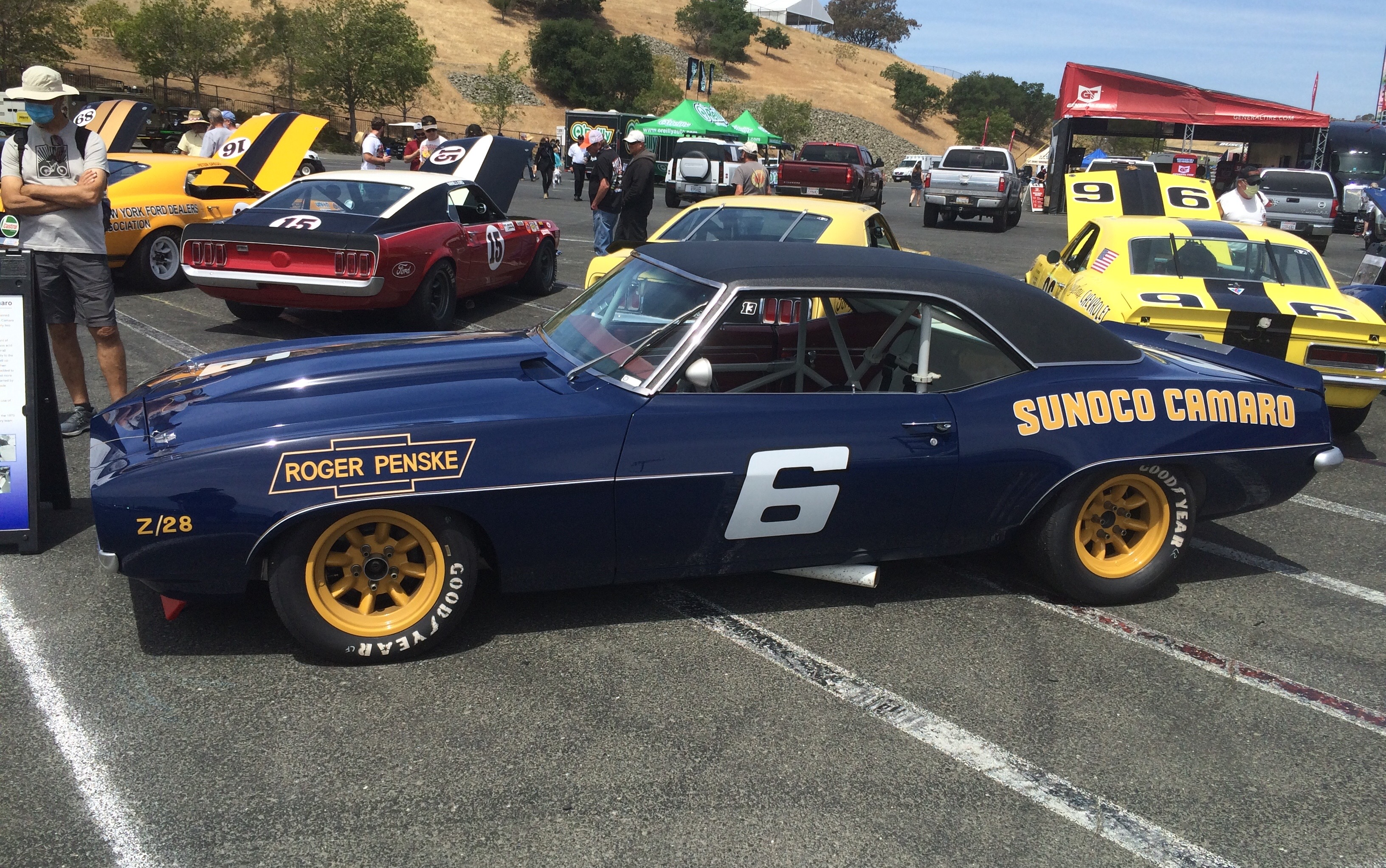
Team Penske's No. 6 1969 Sunoco Chevrolet Camaro raced in the Trans-Am Series.

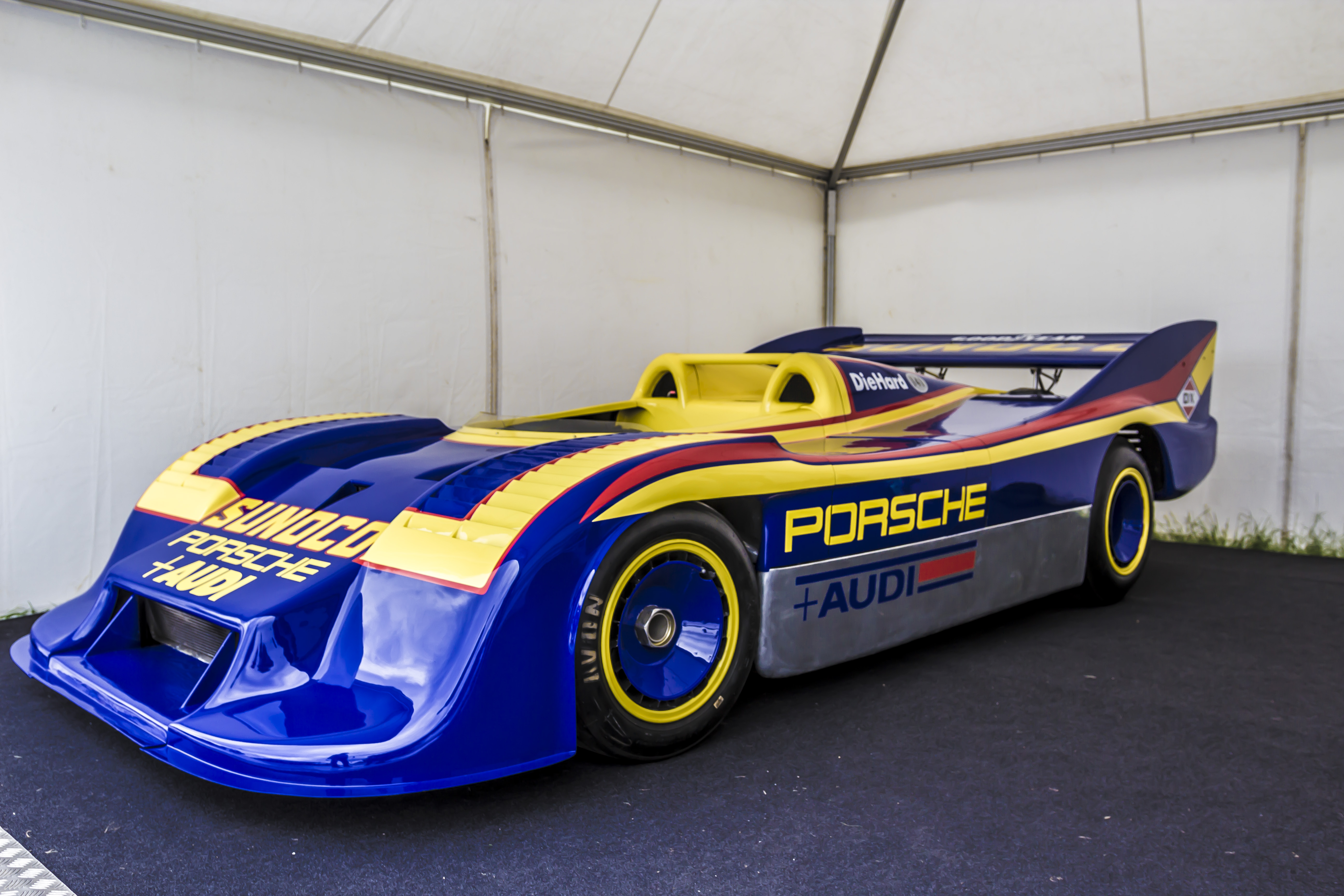
Team Penske's Sunoco Porsche + Audi 1973 Can-Am Series car

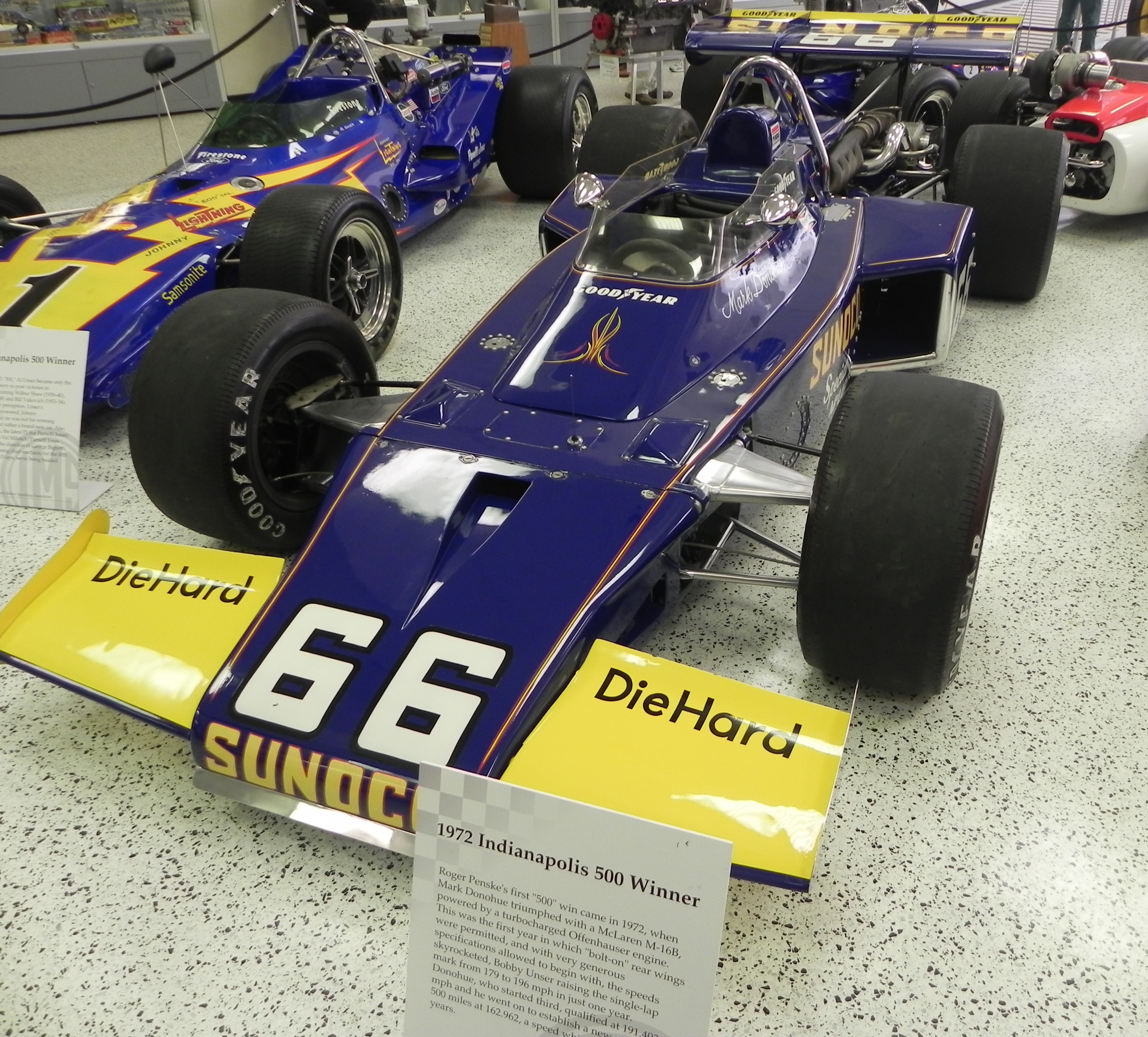
Team Penske's 1972 Indianapolis 500 winning McLaren M-6B powered by Offenhauser race car

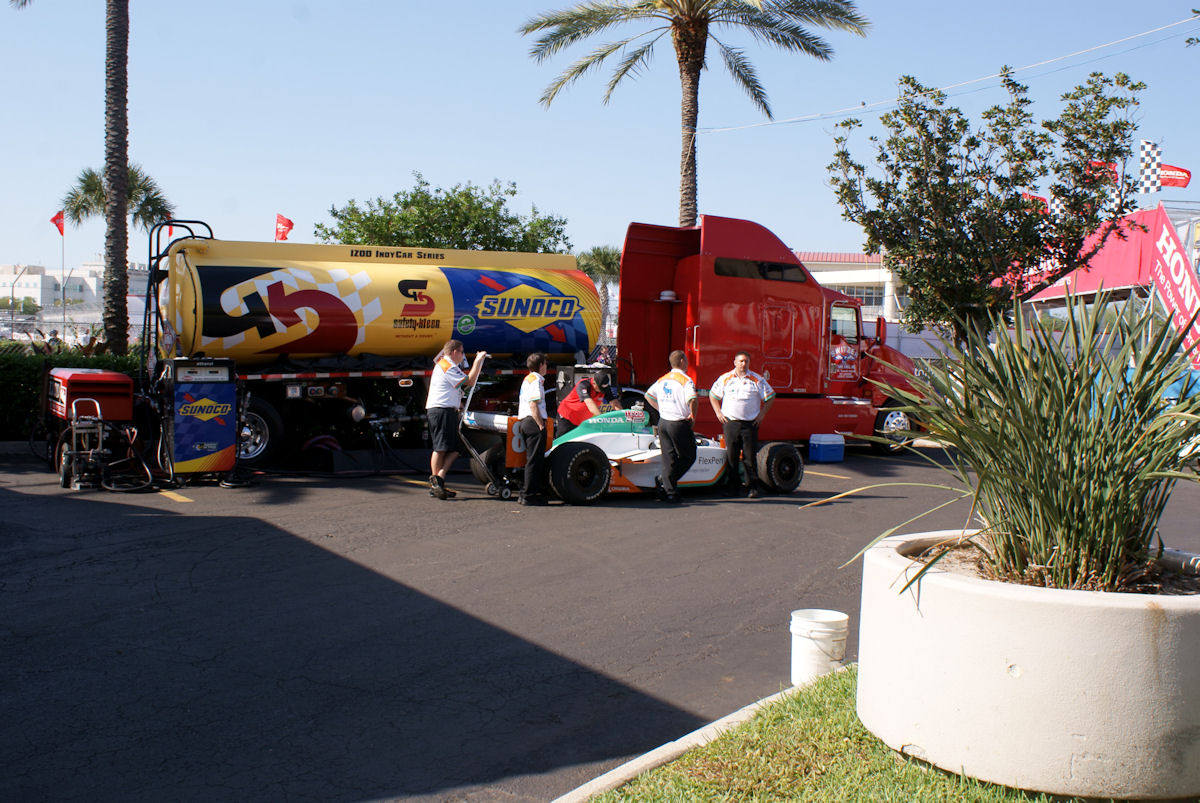
A Sunoco fuel tanker truck refueling Charlie Kimball's No. 83 Honda IndyCar

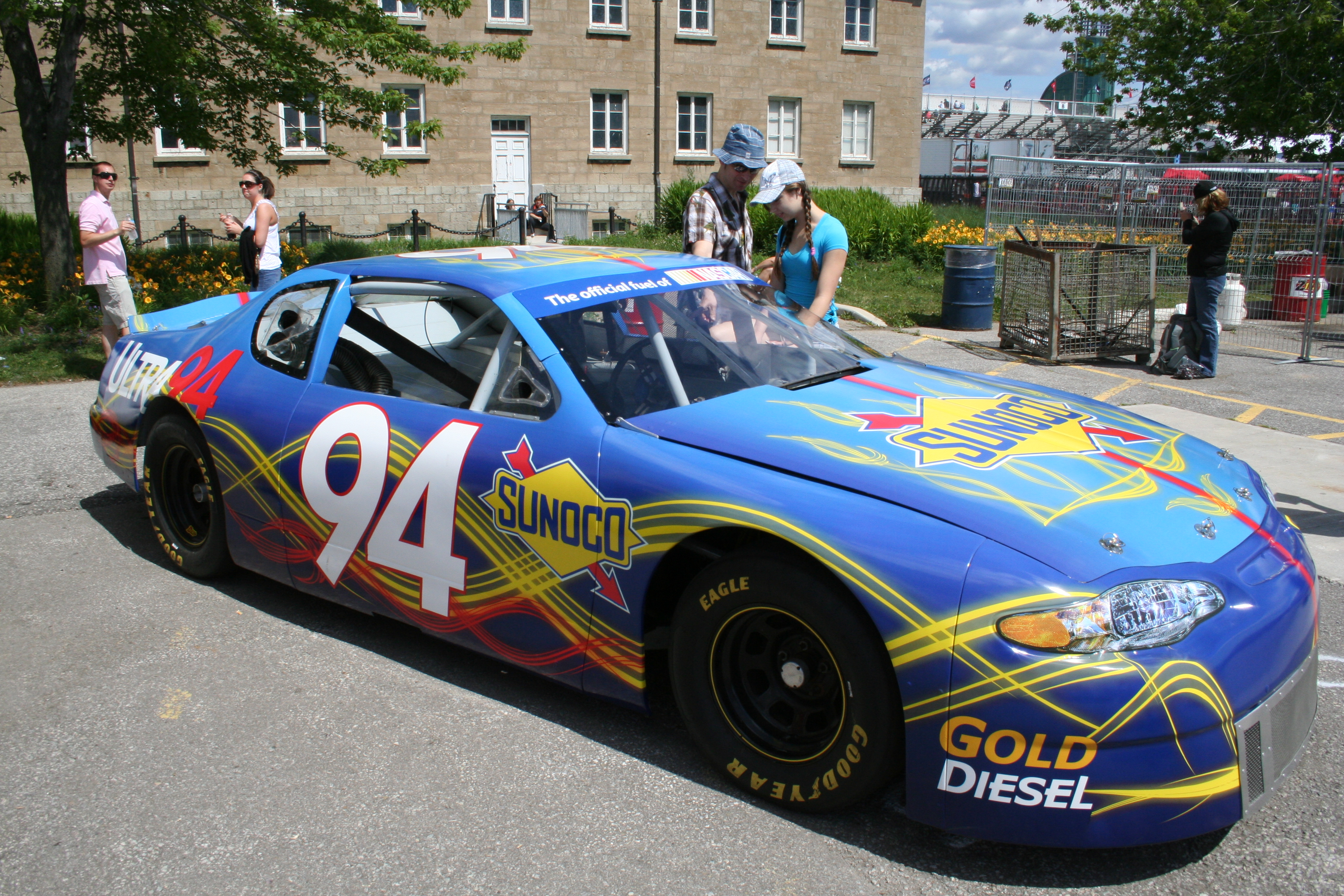
Sunoco Ultra94 sponsored No. 94 NASCAR display at the Honda Indy Toronto race.

== Sponsorships ==
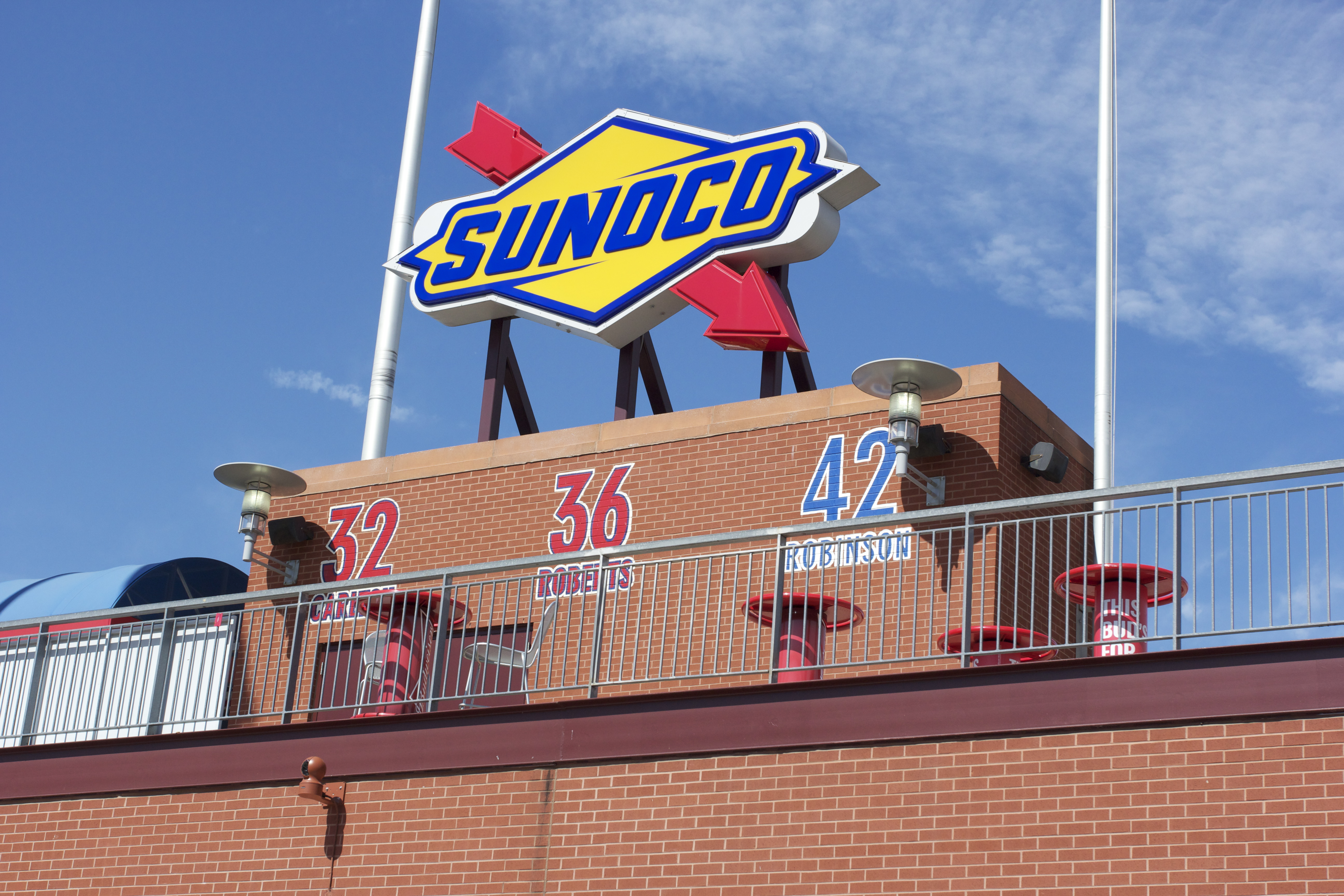
Sunoco signage at Citizens Bank Park, home of the Philadelphia Phillies

Sunoco is a partner with the following:

- Hershey Bears – American Hockey League Affiliate of the Washington Capitals
- Hersheypark – Sponsor of the Twin Turnpike – Classic Cars and Twin Turnpike – Speedway cars.
- Lavar Scott and Alpha Prime Racing — Primary sponsor of the driver and team in the NASCAR O'Reilly Auto Parts Series

== See also ==
- List of automotive fuel brands
- List of companies in Dallas
- Sunoco v. Honolulu
