= Dutch Americans in New York City =

Dutch people have had a continuous presence in New York City for over 400 years, being the earliest European settlers. New York City traces its origins to a trading post founded on the southern tip of Manhattan Island by colonists from the Dutch Republic in 1624. The settlement was named New Amsterdam in 1626 and was chartered as a city in 1653. Because of the history of Dutch colonization, Dutch culture, politics, law, architecture, and language played a formative role in the shaping of New York City culture. The Dutch were the majority in New York City until the early 1700s, and the Dutch language was commonly spoken until the mid to late-1700s. Dutch became rare by the mid-1800s, but continued to be natively spoken by a small minority of New Yorkers until the late 19th century.

== Toponomy ==
Many places and institutions in New York City still bear a colonial Dutch toponymy, including Brooklyn (Breukelen), Harlem (Haarlem), Wall Street (Waal Straat), Bowery (bouwerij), and Coney Island (conyne).

== Culture ==
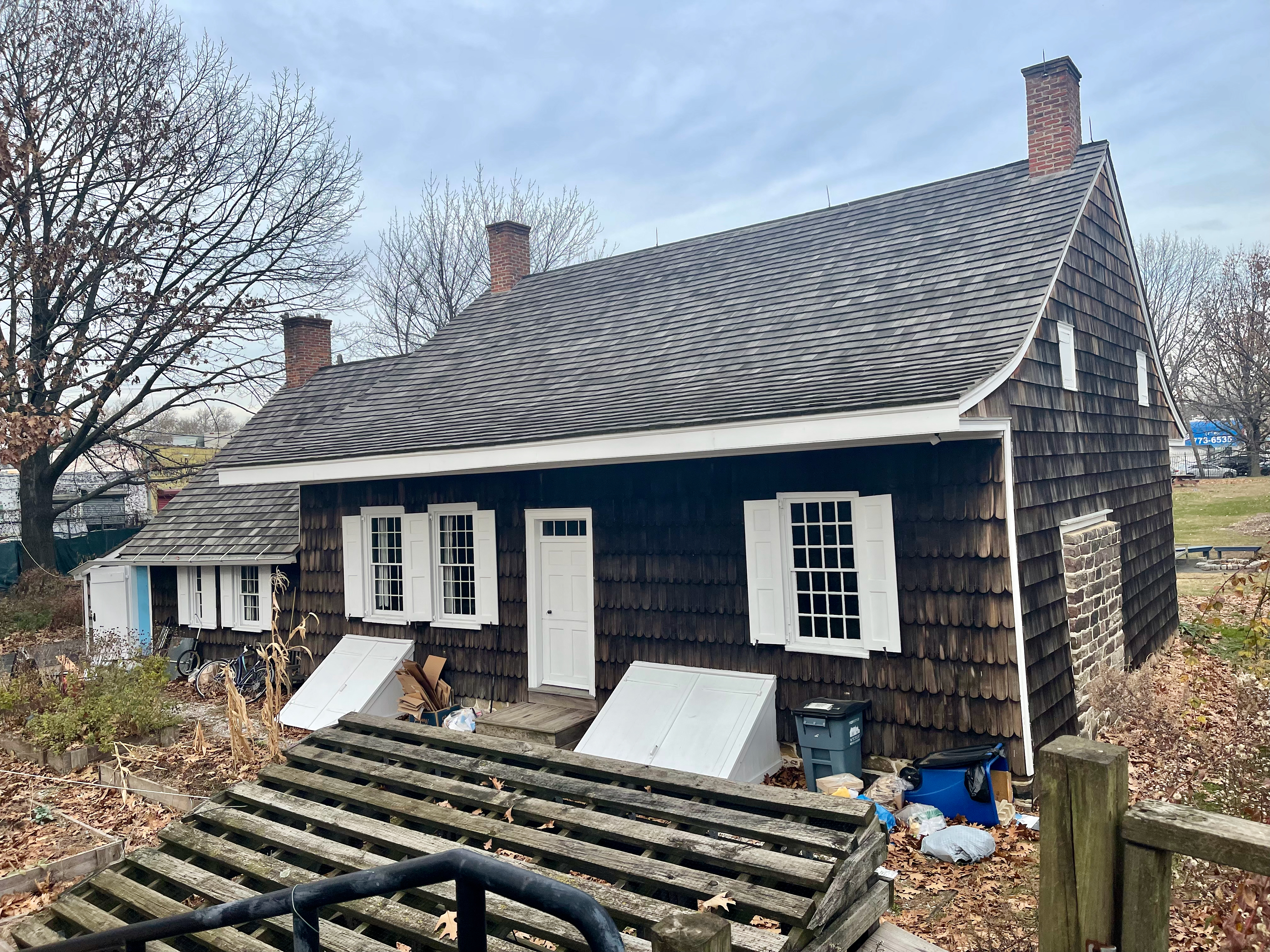
Wyckoff House in Brooklyn, 2007.

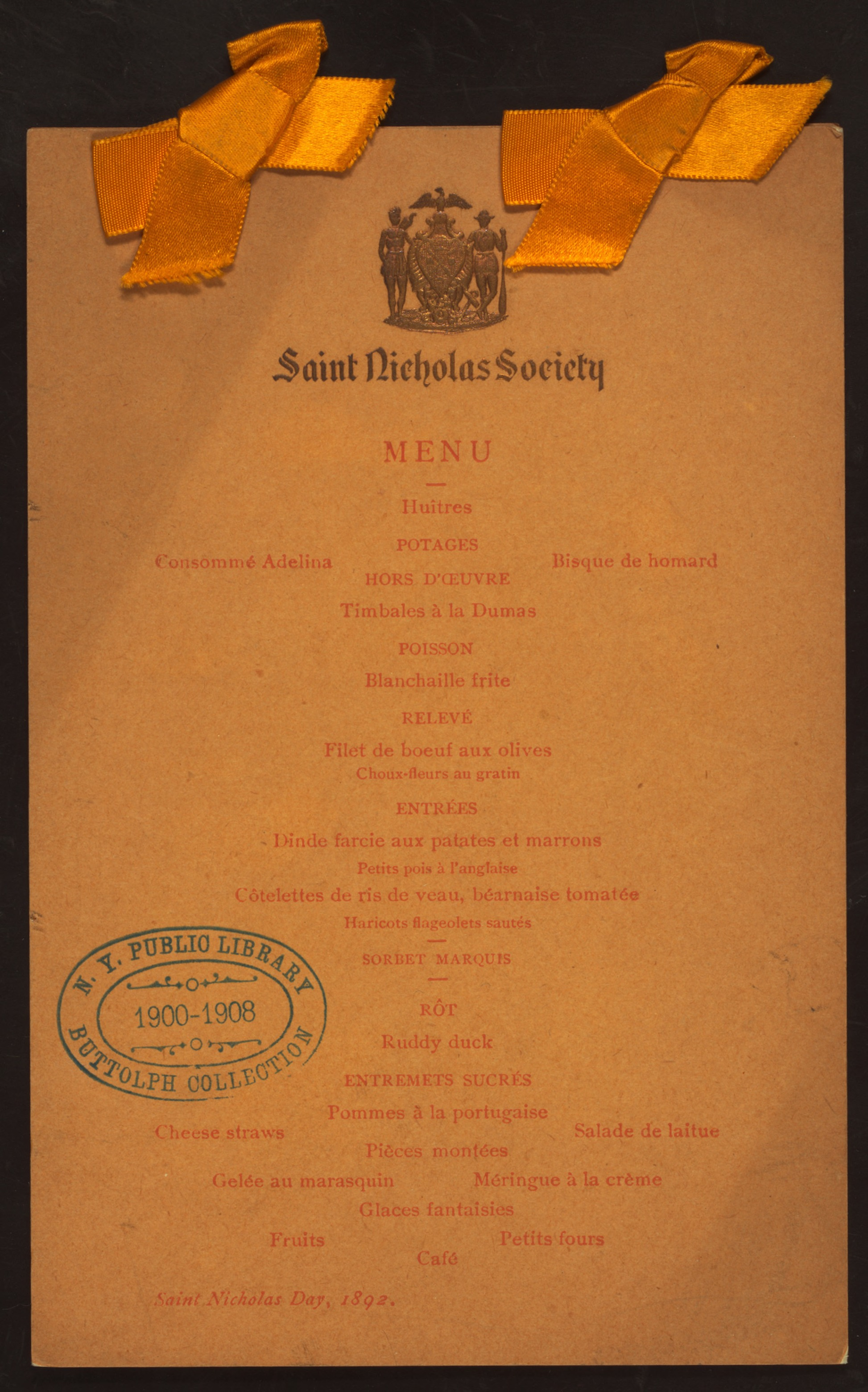
Saint Nicholas Day event held in 1892 by the Saint Nicholas Day Society in 1892.

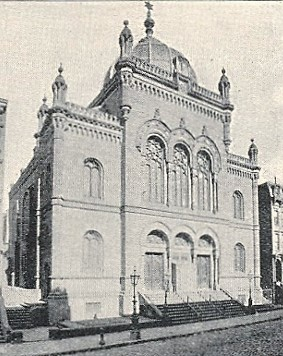
Congregation Shaaray Tefila, 127 West 44th Street. Henry Fernbach, arch. (1869).

The New York Dutch Room at the Metropolitan Museum of Art features historical artifacts from Dutch homes in New York.

=== Knickerbockers ===
The term "Knickerbockers" comes from a name assumed by Washington Irving in writing his work "Knickerbocker's history of New York", published in 1809. The title was used as an advertising scheme to announce the book, and since then the descendants of the Dutch in New York have been called "Knickerbockers." Knickerbocker, or "knickers" refers to the breeches that the Dutch settlers would wear.

The African American Pinkster Committee of New York (AAPCNY) along with the African Burial Ground National Monument hold an annual pinkster celebration in New York City. Originally a Dutch Christian holiday celebrating Pentecost, pinkster has subsequently evolved into a primarily African-American holiday incorporating elements of Angolan, Congolese, and other African culture.

== Institutions and landmarks ==
The Saint Nicholas Society of the City of New York is a charitable organization whose membership is composed of men who are descended from New York's early inhabitants, many of whom can trace their ancestry back to the earliest colonial Dutch settlers.

The Wyckoff House, an historic house in Brooklyn's Canarsie neighborhood, is the oldest surviving example of Dutch frame architecture in the United States, dating to 1652.

== Religion ==
=== Christianity ===
List of former Dutch Reformed churches in New York City:

- Brighton Heights Reformed Church
- Collegiate Reformed Protestant Dutch Church
- Flatbush Reformed Dutch Church Complex
- Marble Collegiate Church
- Middle Collegiate Church
- New Utrecht Reformed Church
- Old First Reformed Church (Brooklyn)
- St. Nicholas Collegiate Reformed Protestant Dutch Church

=== Judaism ===
In September 1654, the first organized group of Jewish immigrants arrived in New Amsterdam. The group consisted of 23 Sephardi Jews from Recife who were fleeing the Portuguese Inquisition following the Portuguese conquest of Dutch Brazil.

The Ansche Chesed synagogue on the Upper West Side was founded in 1828 by a group of Dutch, German, and Polish Jews who split off from Congregation B'nai Jeshurun.

Temple Shaaray Tefila on the Upper East Side was founded in 1845 by 50 primarily Dutch Jews and English Jews who had been members of B'nai Jeshurun, and was officially chartered in 1848. It was initially an Orthodox synagogue, but slowly turned to Reform Judaism over the years.

== Notable New Yorkers of Dutch descent ==
- Ace Frehley, a musician best known as the original lead guitarist and co-founding member of the American rock band Kiss.
- Augustus Newbold Morris, a prominent figure during the Gilded Age in New York City.
- Gouverneur Morris, a Founding Father of the United States and signatory to the Articles of Confederation and the United States Constitution.
- Gouverneur Morris Jr., a railroad executive.
- Lewis Morris (speaker), a colonial judge, politician and vast landowner.
- List of presidents of the Saint Nicholas Society of the City of New York

== See also ==
- New Netherland
- New Netherlander
