= Collegiate Reformed Protestant Dutch Church =

Church in Manhattan, New York

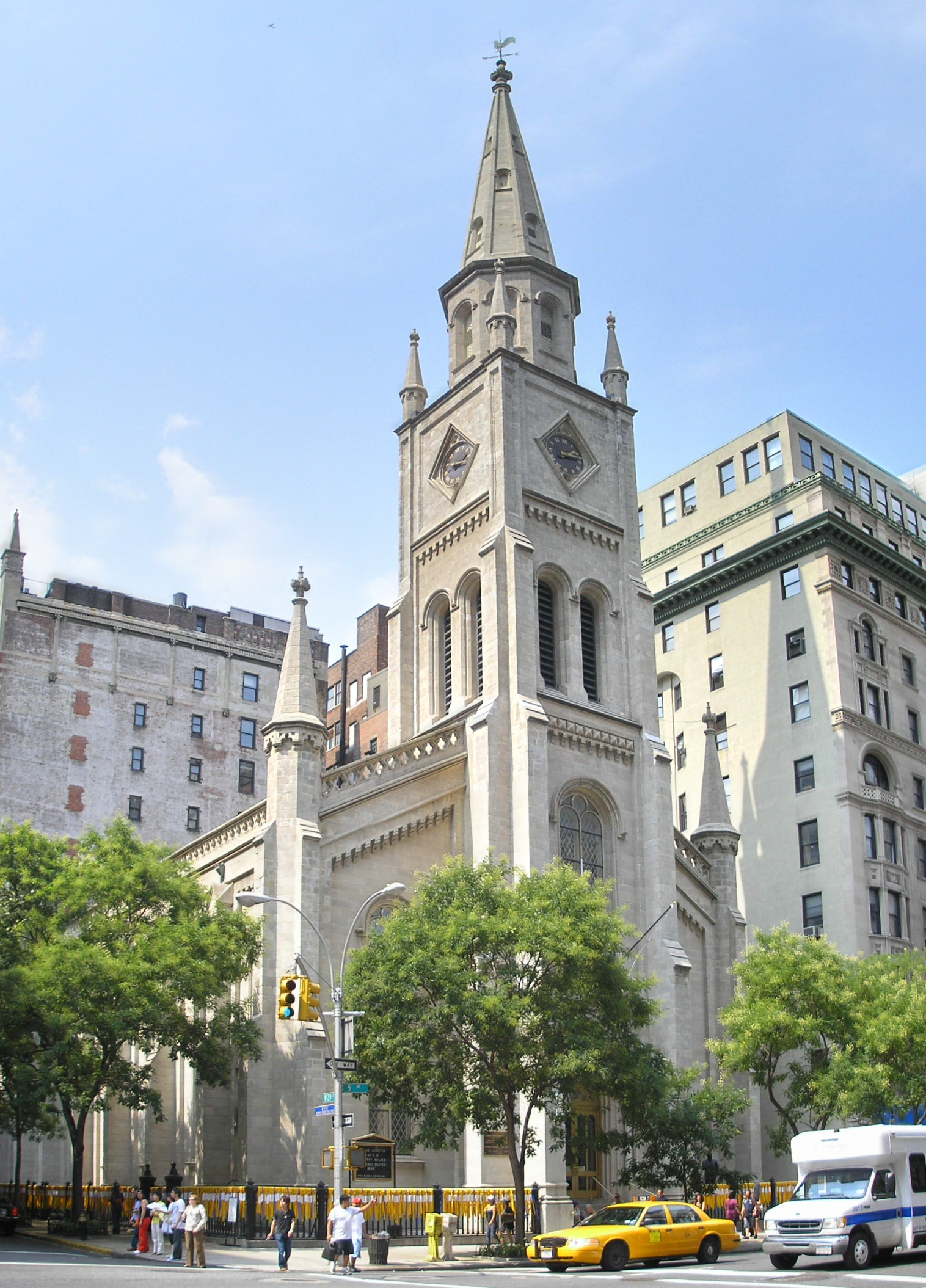
Marble Collegiate Church, on Fifth Avenue at 29th Street

The Collegiate Reformed Protestant Dutch Church is a Dutch Reformed congregation in Manhattan, New York City, which has had a variety of church buildings and now exists in the form of four component bodies: the Marble, Middle, West End and Fort Washington Collegiate Church, all part of the Reformed Protestant Dutch Churches of New York. The original congregation was established in 1628.

== History ==
=== First church ===
Peter Minuit "had Kryn Frederick, the Company's engineer, build a solid fort ... called Fort Amsterdam. It was surrounded by cedar palisades, and was large enough to shelter all the people of the little colony in case of danger. Inside this fort there was a house for the Governor, and outside the walls was a warehouse for furs, and a mill which was run by horse-power, with a large room on the second floor to be used as a church."

=== 1633 church ===
The congregation's first church building, built on what is now Pearl Street in New York City facing the East River, to replace services held in lofts, was a simple timber structure with a gambrel roof and no spire. The lofts described probably indicate the premises provided by Kryn Frederick.

Other sources claim a "second church" was built was located just outside the fort. In those sources, this claimed as the church that Governor Van Twiller built, which was described as "little better than a barn". This is probably describing the Pearl Street premises of 1633. "By this time negro slaves were being brought to the colony from Africa. They did the household work, while the colonists cultivated the fields. These slaves did most of the work on a new wooden church which was set up just outside the fort, for the new minister."

By 1638, when Willem Kieft became director, "The fort was almost in ruins from neglect. The church was in little better condition. The mills were so out of repair that even if the wind could have reached them they could not have been made to do their work properly."

=== c.1643 church ===
The second church was located within Fort Amsterdam's walls. The stone church had a spire with weathercock, and was the tallest structure in the city. After the fall of New Amsterdam to the English, the structure was reused as a military garrison church for the Anglican faith.

The church that Walter Van Twiller had built was little better than a barn. The minister wanted a new one, and so did his congregation. Governor Kieft decided that there should be one of stone, and that it should be built inside the fort. There was a question as how to secure the money to build it. Kieft gave a small amount, as did other colonists, but there was not enough. Fortunately, just at this time, a daughter of Bogardus, the minister, was married. At the wedding, when the guests were in good humor, a subscription-list was handed out. The guests tried to outdo one another in subscribing money for the new church. Next day some of the subscribers were sorry they had agreed to give so much, but the Governor accepted no excuses and insisted on the money. It was collected, and the church was built.

This church was the site where the Rev. Everardus Bogardus denounced Director-General of New Netherland Willem Kieft's administration during Kieft's War – which was probably the reason the church was moved into the fort in the first place – and where the banished shipwreck survivor Cornelis Melyn returned and caused a writ from the States General to be presented to Petrus Stuyvesant on March 8, 1649. As Burton describes the confrontation:

Melyn appeared at this meeting and demanded that Their High Mightinesses' Letter and the mandamus be read and explained to the people. In the midst of considerable excitement, Melyn handed the mandamus to Arnoldus van Hardenbergh to be read aloud. Stuyvesant in a rage snatched the mandamus from van Hardenbergh's hands, and in the confusion the seal was torn off. Melyn then offered Stuyvesant a copy of the mandamus, whereupon the latter was induced by some of the bystanders to return the original, which was read, including of course the summons commanding Stuyvesant to enter appearance without delay at the Hague to defend the judgment. Stuyvesant replied: "I honor the States General, and their commission and will obey their commands, and will send an agent to maintain the judgment as it was well and legally pronounced." Melyn demanded a written reply, but this neither Stuyvesant nor his Secretary would give.

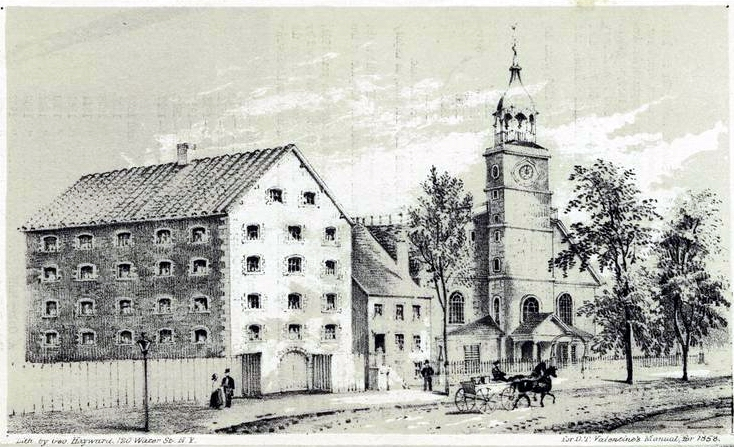
The 1731 Middle Dutch Church as it appeared in 1830

=== 1693 Garden Street Church ===
The Garden Street Church, located on what is now Exchange Place, was built to replace the garrison church after its appropriation by the authorities. The congregation was granted a full charter as the Dutch Church in America by King William III of England on May 19, 1696.

=== 1731 Middle Collegiate Church ===
The original Middle Collegiate Church was on Nassau Street near Cedar Street, and was built in 1731. During the Revolutionary War, it was occupied by the British, who used it at various times as a prison, a hospital and a riding school. It reverted to being a church after the war. From 1844 to 1875, the building was the city's main Post Office. It was torn down in 1882.

=== 1769 North Church ===
In 1769, to serve the needs of a growing congregation, the North Church was established.

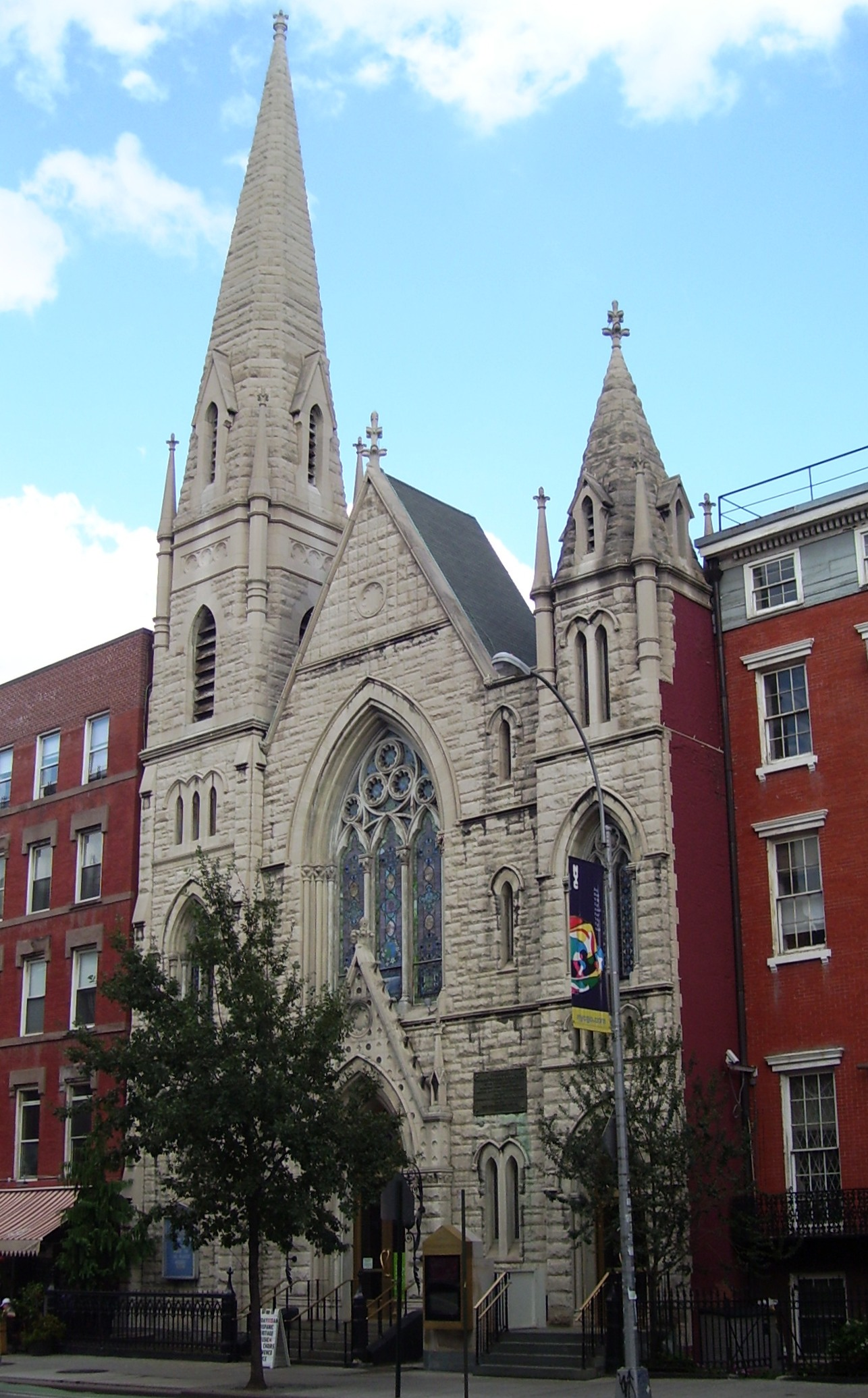
The New Middle Collegiate Church, on Second Avenue in the East Village

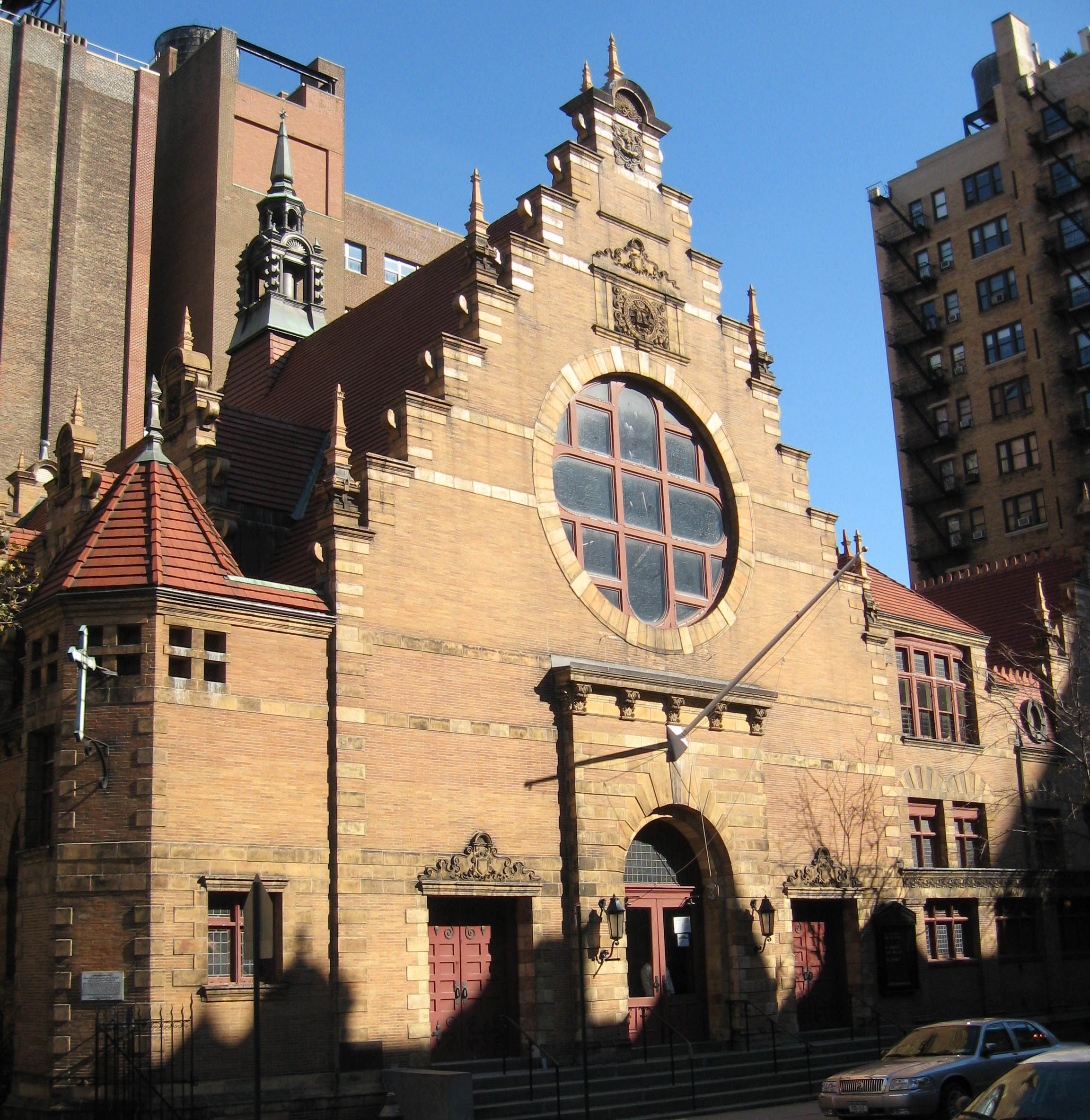
West End Collegiate Church, at West End Avenue and West 77th Street

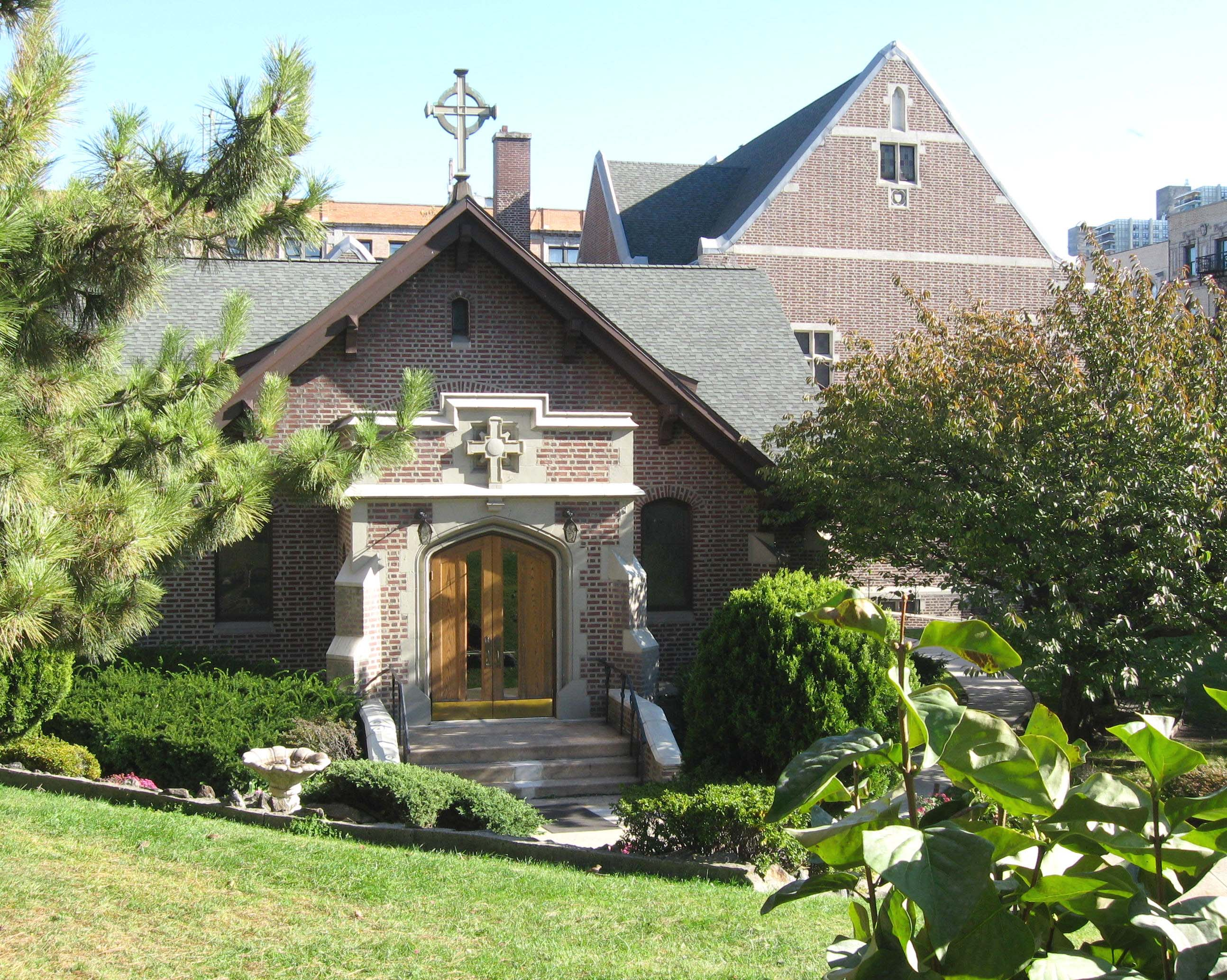
The Fort Washington Collegiate Church at 470 Fort Washington Avenue and West 181st Street

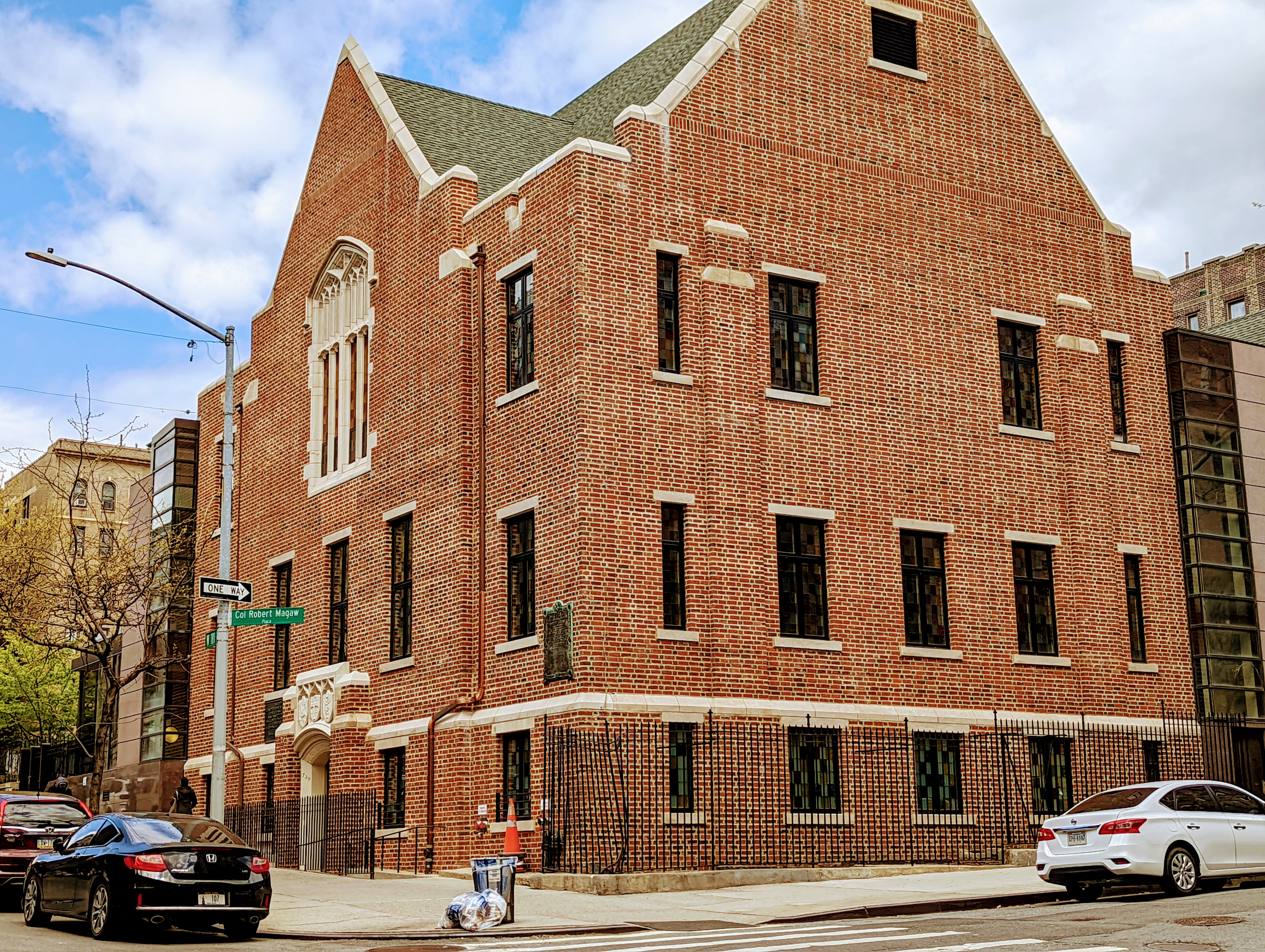
Fort Washington Collegiate Church Parish Hall 2022 renovation

=== 1839 Second Middle Collegiate Church, or Middle Dutch Church ===
The Middle Dutch Church or Middle Collegiate Church, which was built from 1836–1839, was located on Lafayette Place, now Lafayette Street, near La Grange Terrace. It was built as the second Collegiate Church congregation continued to move uptown with the population. Nathan Silver in Lost New York describes this structure as "a single-mindedly classic Greek Revival church by Isaiah Rogers, perhaps his best work." This church was abandoned in 1887 and is no longer existent. Its bell was relocated to the Collegiate Church of St. Nicholas, and then went to the New Middle Collegiate Church when St. Nicholas was demolished.

=== 1854 Marble Collegiate Church ===
The Marble Collegiate Church was built in 1854 at the corner of Fifth Avenue and West 29th Street. Originally called the Fifth Avenue Collegiate Church and sometimes referred to as the 29th Street Church, the church received the name "Marble" in 1906, after its facade made of Tuckahoe marble. The pastor for many years was Norman Vincent Peale, well known for his book The Power of Positive Thinking.

=== 1872 St. Nicholas Collegiate Church ===
The St. Nicholas Collegiate Church at 600 Fifth Avenue at 48th Street was built in 1869-72, designed by W. Wheeler Smith in the Gothic Revival style, which critic Montgomery Schuyler called "Gothic gone roaring mad". Before being named after St. Nicholas, it was known as the Fifth Avenue Church and the Forty-Eighth Street Church. The church was demolished in 1949.

=== 1891 New Middle Collegiate Church ===
The New Middle Collegiate Church, built in 1891-92 and designed by S.B. Reed, is located on Second Avenue between 6th and 7th Streets. When initially built, the church had reading-rooms and a gymnasium. The sanctuary's stained-glass windows were of Tiffany glass. It is located within the East Village/Lower East Side Historic District, created in October 2012. It housed the New York Liberty Bell. A fire in December 2020 significantly damaged the facility.

=== 1892 West End Collegiate Church ===
The West End Collegiate Church, located at the northeast corner of West End Avenue and West 77th Street was built 1891-92, to the design of Robert W. Gibson.

=== 1909 Fort Washington Collegiate Church ===
The Fort Washington Collegiate Church at 470 Fort Washington Avenue began as an outreach of the West End Collegiate Church. The church was built in 1908-09 and was designed by the firm of Nelson & Van Wagenen in the Country Gothic style. In 1916, it became a full member of the Collegiate Reformed Protestant Dutch Church, along with the Marble, Middle and West End Collegiate Churches. It incorporates the congregation of the Hamilton Grange Reformed Church and former members of the Harlem Reformed Dutch Church.
