= Fort Washington Collegiate Church =

Church in Manhattan, New York

Coordinates: 40.850966°N 73.937569°W

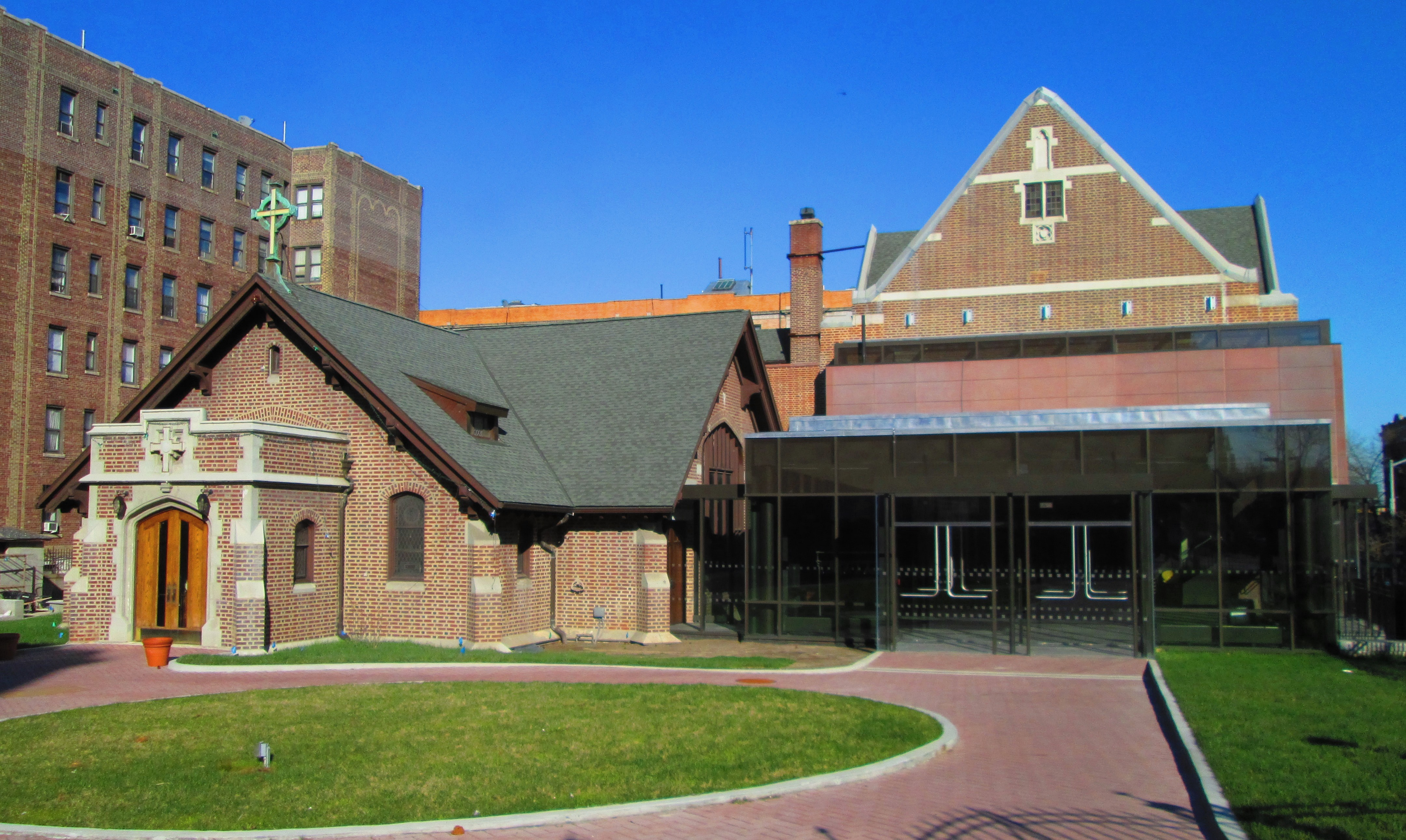
View from Fort Washington Avenue in 2016, showing the new glass-enclosed multipurpose room on the right

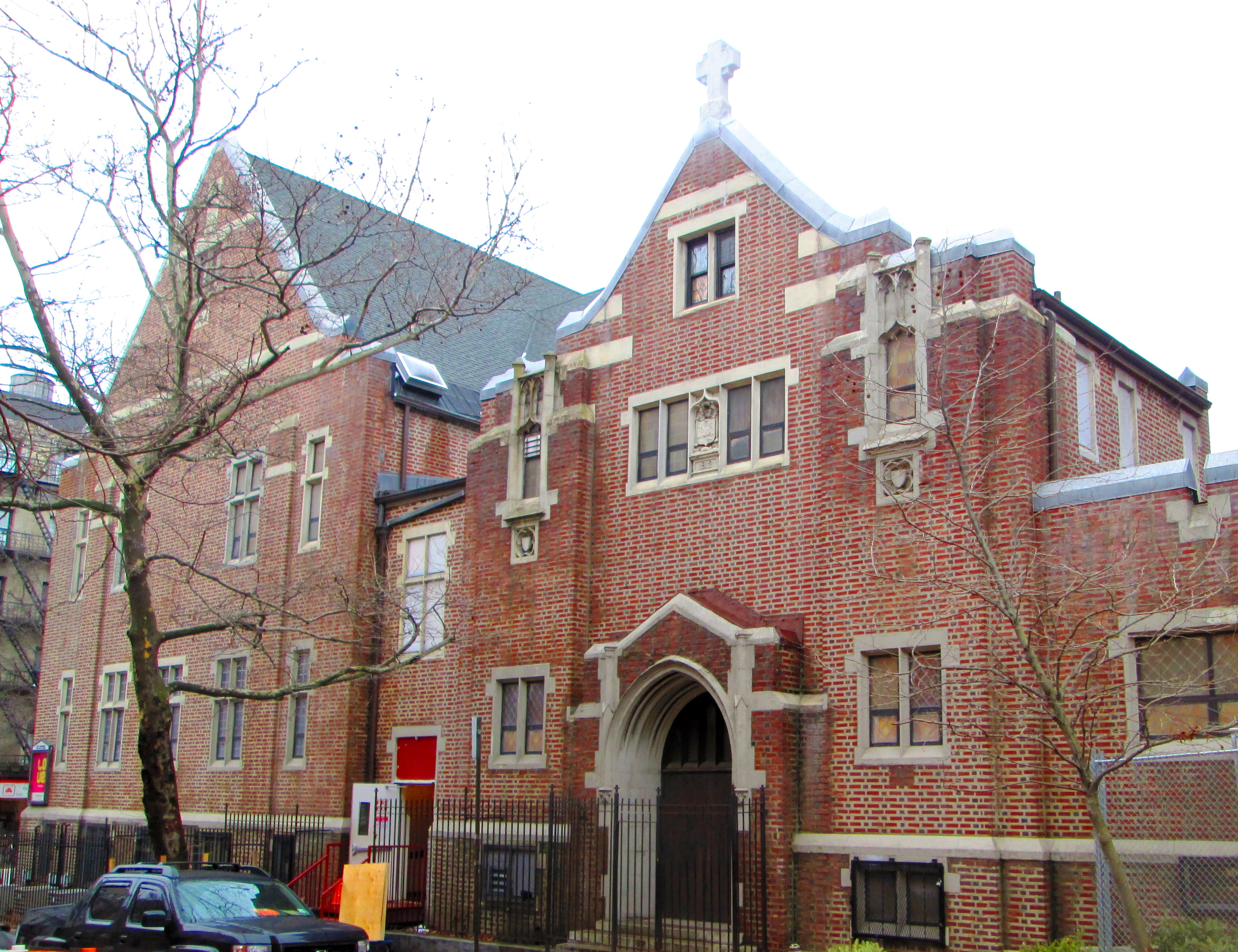
Fellowship Hall from Magaw Place

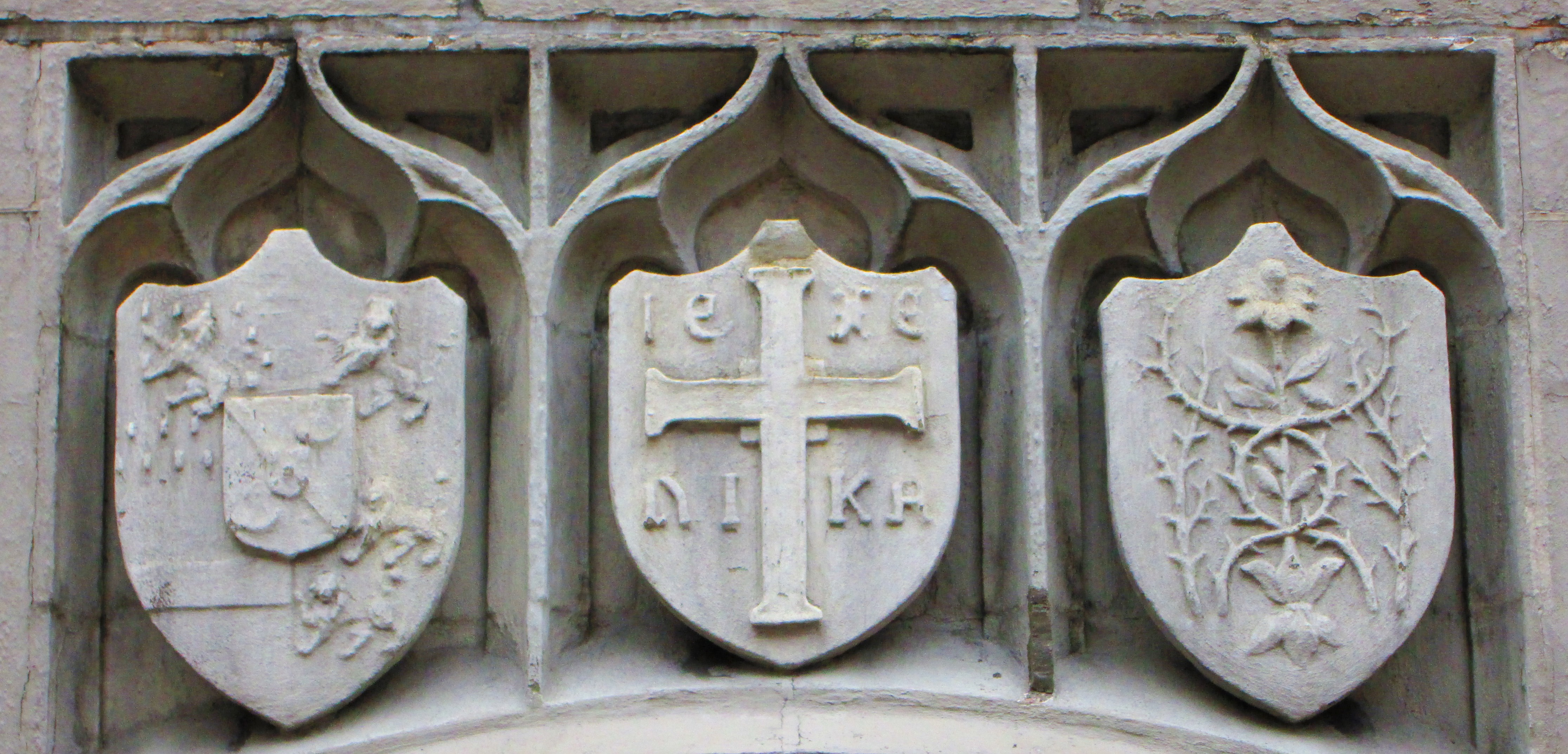
Fellowship Hall 181st Street entrance detail

Fort Washington Collegiate Church is a Collegiate Reformed Protestant Dutch Church located at Magaw Place and 181st Street in the Washington Heights neighborhood of Manhattan, New York City.

The congregation's Country Gothic style building was designed by the architecture firm Nelson & Van Wagenen, and constructed in 1908–9 as an outreach of the West End Collegiate Church, at a time when the area was a suburb of New York City. It became a full member of the Collegiate Reformed Protestant Dutch Church in 1916, along with the Marble, Middle and West End Collegiate Churches. Ft. Washington Collegiate incorporates the congregation of the Hamilton Grange Reformed Church and former members of the Harlem Reformed Dutch Church.

The church carried out a major renovation and expansion of its buildings beginning in 2013.

== Notable clergy ==
A. J. Muste was pastor from the time of the church's foundation in 1909 until he left the Reformed Church in 1914 due to an alteration in his theological principles.

Rev. Robert Rodriguez was named Pastor in 2013, the first Latino pastor in the history of the Collegiate Reformed Protestant Dutch Church in the United States.

== See also ==
- Collegiate Reformed Protestant Dutch Church
