= Middle Collegiate Church =

Church in Manhattan, New York

Coordinates: 40°43′40″N 73°59′17″W

Middle Collegiate Reformed Church
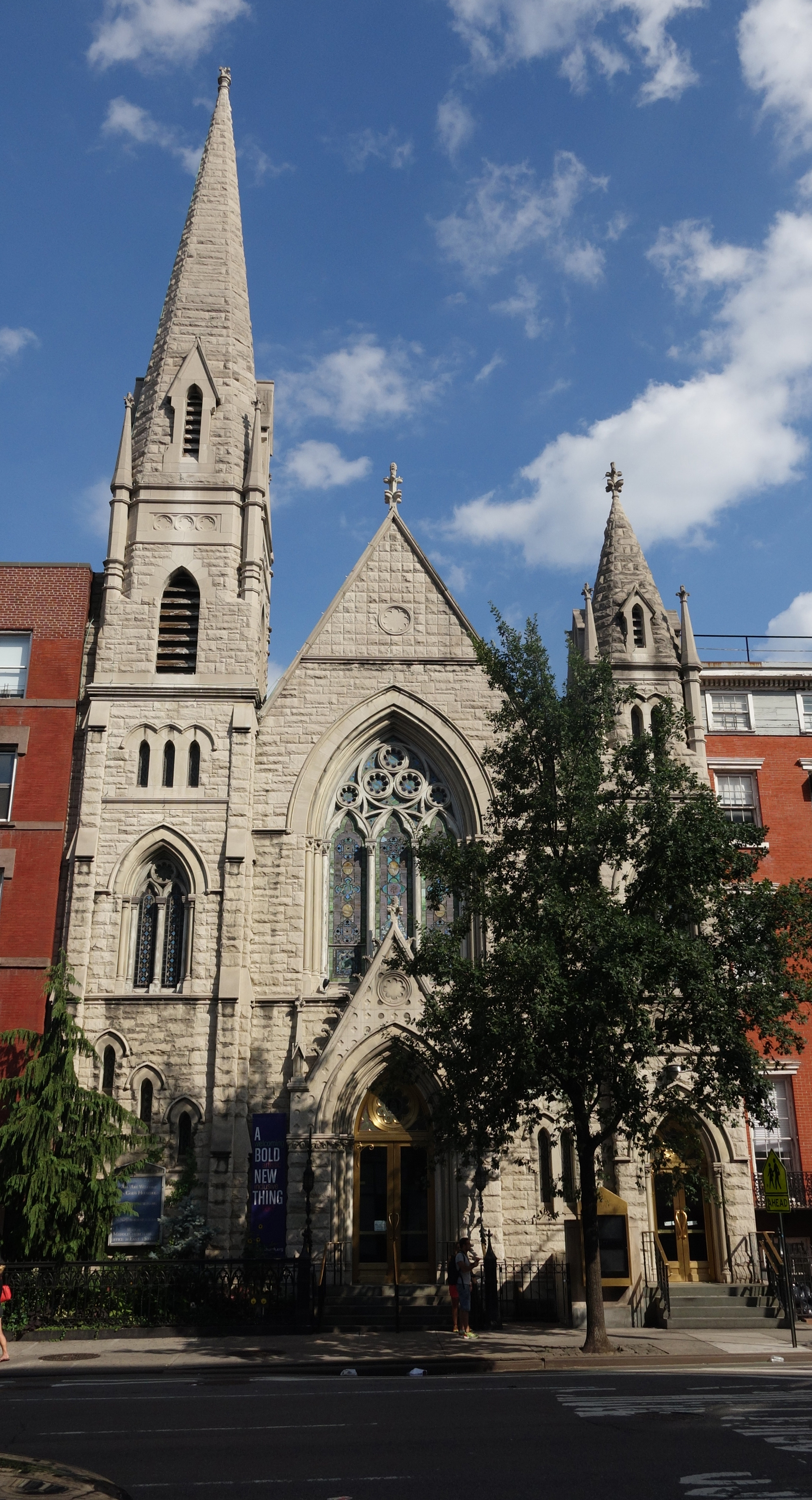
- The Church prior to the 2020 fire

- Location within Manhattan Location within New York Location within the United States
- Location: 112 Second Avenue between 6th and 7th Street; Manhattan, New York City
- Country: United States
- Denomination: Interdenominational: RCA; UCC
- Website: middlechurch.org

History
- Status: Gutted by 6-alarm fire in 2020

Architecture
- Architect: Samuel B. Reed
- Architectural type: Gothic Revival
- Years built: 1891–1892

The Middle Collegiate Church is a United Church of Christ church located at 112 Second Avenue between 6th and 7th Streets in the East Village neighborhood of Manhattan, New York City.

The Gothic Revival church was built from 1891 to 1892 as the congregation's fourth location, and was designed by Samuel B. Reed. It featured stained-glass windows by Louis Comfort Tiffany. It is located within the East Village/Lower East Side Historic District. It is part of the Collegiate Reformed Protestant Dutch Church.

On December 5, 2020, the church was gutted by a fire that left only its stone exterior and its bell intact.

== Church building ==
The church was built in 1891 on a site directly north of the Isaac T. Hopper House, and was designed by the architect S. B. Reed, "'thoroughly equipped' as one guide said, 'with reading-rooms, gymnasium, and all appliances for aggressive modern church work'." The stained-glass windows were of Tiffany glass.

The church bell, moved to the current building in 1949, was cast in Amsterdam in 1729. It was known as "New York's Liberty Bell" because it was rung to celebrate the signing of the Declaration of Independence in 1776. It also marked the inaugurations and deaths of American presidents, remembrances of the September 11th attacks, and other occasions, such as the death of King George VI in 1952.

The congregation is known for its activism.

== Previous locations ==
The congregation was founded in 1628 in what was then the Dutch settlement of New Amsterdam, and the first Middle Church was built in 1731 on Nassau Street. It is one of the oldest continuous Protestant congregations in North America. During the American Revolutionary War, when the British occupied New York, the Nassau Street building was used as a prison, a hospital, and a riding school. After the war it was converted back to a church, but became the city's main post office in 1844, a role it played for over 30 years.

Meanwhile, the congregation built another sanctuary on Lafayette Place from 1836 to 1839. Called the Second Middle Collegiate Church, or the Lafayette Place Middle Dutch Church, it was an Isaiah Rogers-designed Greek Revival building with a spire, an unusual combination which provoked the remark that the spire was there to Christianize the pagan building below it. The congregation abandoned the building in 1887, and it was razed, but not before the bell was moved to the Collegiate Church of St. Nicholas. It returned to the Middle Collegiate Church – by now at Second Avenue – when St. Nicholas was demolished in December 1949.

Other existing churches tracing their congregational founding to the same first Collegiate Reformed Protestant Dutch Church of 1628 include West End Collegiate Church (built 1892), located on the corner of West End Avenue and 77th Street; Marble Collegiate Church, at Fifth Avenue and 29th Street; and the Fort Washington Collegiate Church, at Magaw Place and 181st Street. All are part of the Reformed Church in America.

== Fire ==
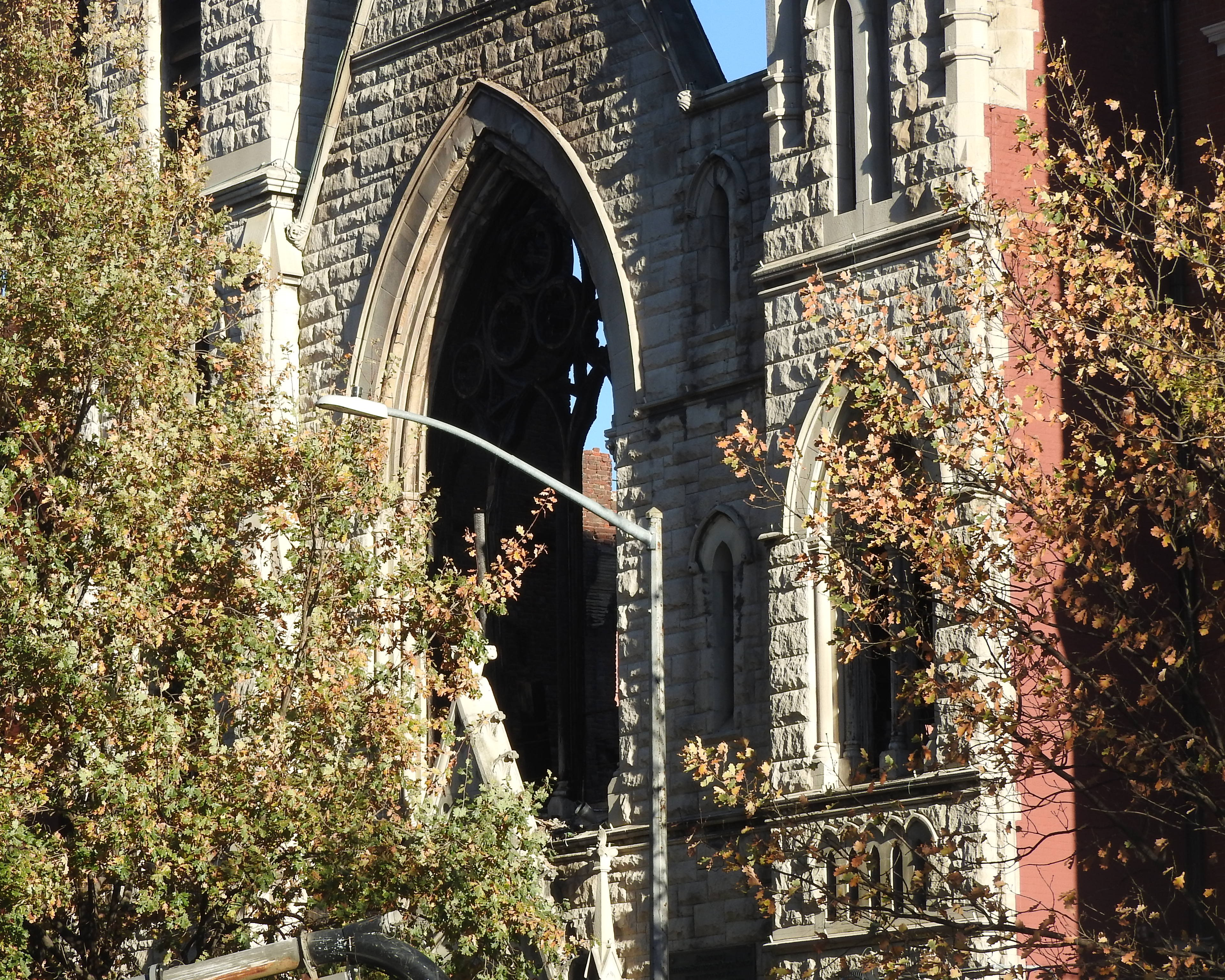
Burned out window

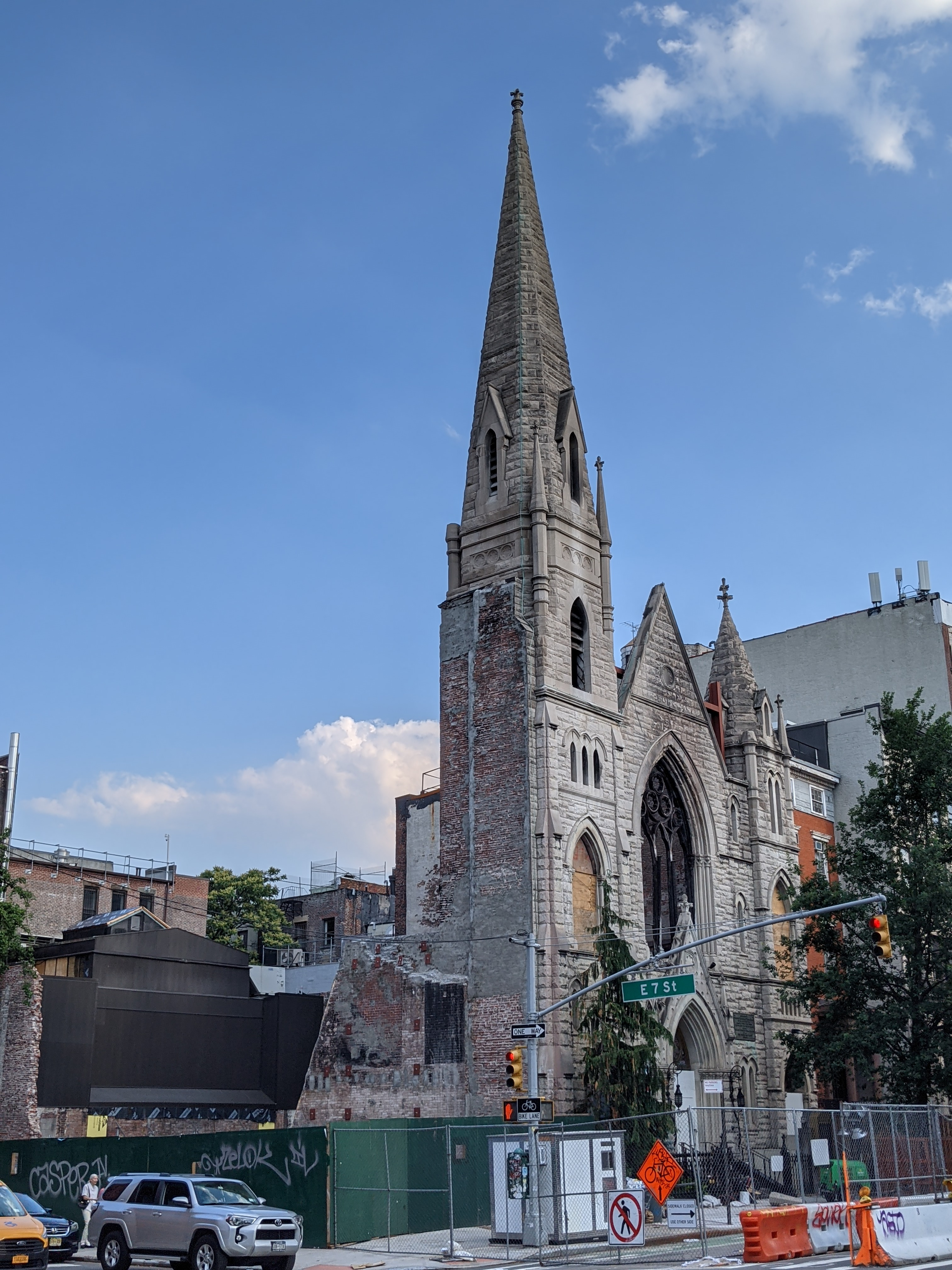
Ruin

On December 5, 2020, a six-alarm fire spread from an adjacent vacant building, engulfed the church structure, and left intact only the exterior stone walls. The fire, accidentally caused by electrical wiring, took nearly eight hours to extinguish. The church roof collapsed, the Tiffany windows were blown out, and the sanctuary was destroyed. Only the "Liberty Bell" and the exterior survived, including the tower in which the bell hung.

A senior minister of the church described the aftermath as "a gutted building full of smoke". New York City Fire Department Assistant Chief John Hodgens described the church and the adjacent building as "total losses", and their structural stability was being evaluated by engineers in the wake of the blaze.

The fate of the church building was initially unclear, but the ministry will continue, and fundraising to rebuild commenced. Mayor Bill de Blasio pledged the city's assistance with rebuilding. Services had been conducted online since March 2020 because of the COVID-19 pandemic, and continued after the blaze. The church was insured for fire, and received about $500,000 in donations by Christmas 2020, but the funds were still "nowhere close to what's needed for rebuilding". Demolition of the remainder of the facade began in November 2023. The congregation planned to erect a new building on the site, with elements salvaged from the old church building.
