= Marble Collegiate Church =

Church in Manhattan, New York

- Marble Collegiate Reformed Church
- U.S. National Register of Historic Places
- New York State Register of Historic Places
- New York City Landmark
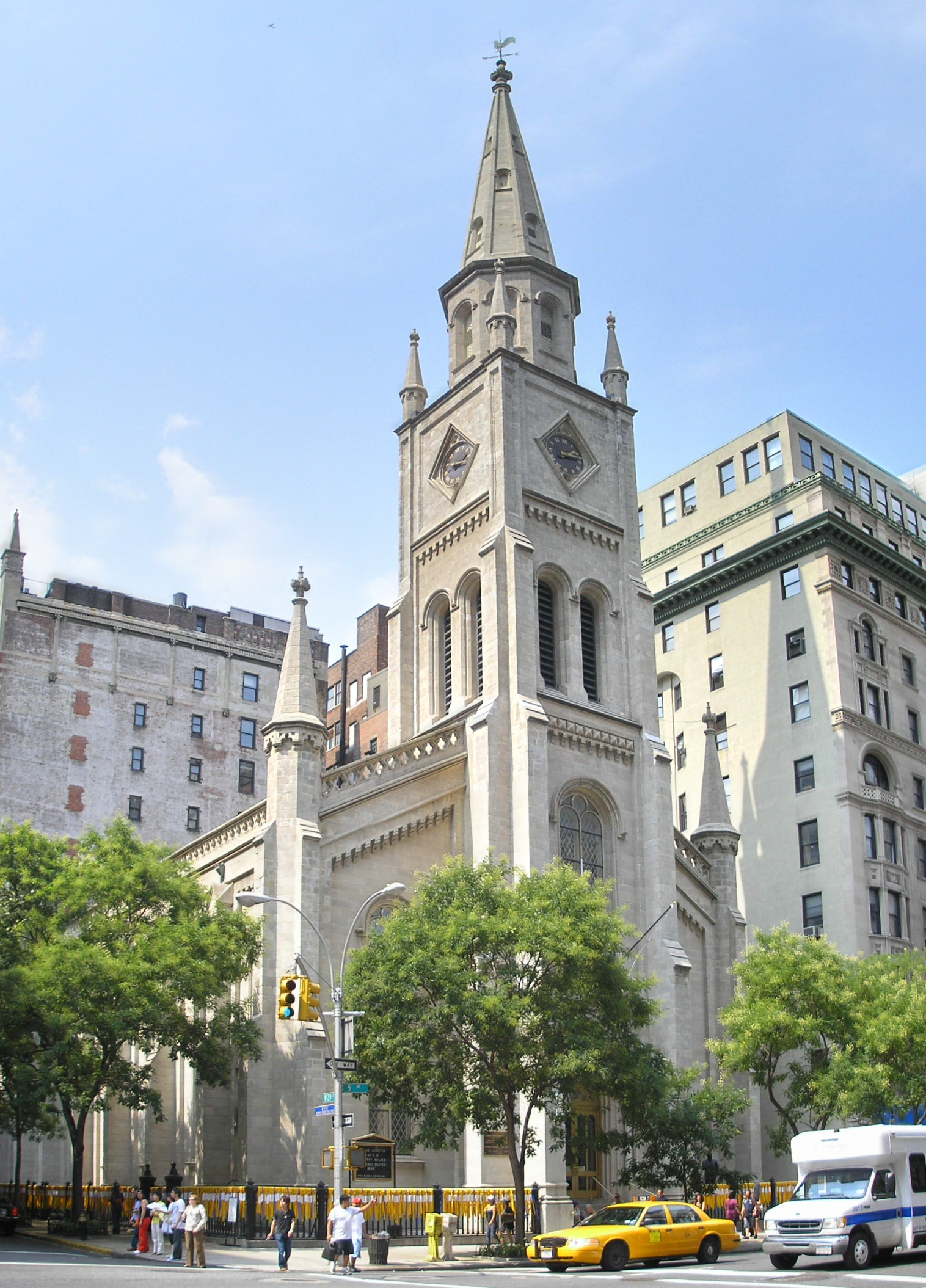
- Marble Collegiate Church

- Location within Lower Manhattan Location within New York City Location within New York Location within the United States
- Location: Manhattan, New York City, New York
- Coordinates: 40°44′44″N 73°59′13″W
- Built: 1851
- Architect: Samuel A. Warner
- Architectural style: Romanesque Revival
- NRHP reference No.: 80002699
- NYSRHP No.: 06101.000088

Significant dates
- Added to NRHP: April 9, 1980
- Designated NYSRHP: June 23, 1980
- Designated NYCL: January 11, 1967

The Marble Collegiate Church, founded in 1628, is one of the oldest continuous Protestant congregations in North America. The congregation, which is part of two denominations in the Reformed tradition—the United Church of Christ and the Reformed Church in America—is located at 272 Fifth Avenue at the corner of West 29th Street in the NoMad neighborhood of Manhattan in New York City. It was built in 1851–54 and was designed by Samuel A. Warner in Romanesque Revival style with Gothic trim. The façade is covered in Tuckahoe marble, for which the church, originally called the Fifth Avenue Church, was renamed in 1906.

The building was designated a New York City landmark in 1967, and was added to the National Register of Historic Places in 1980.

== History ==
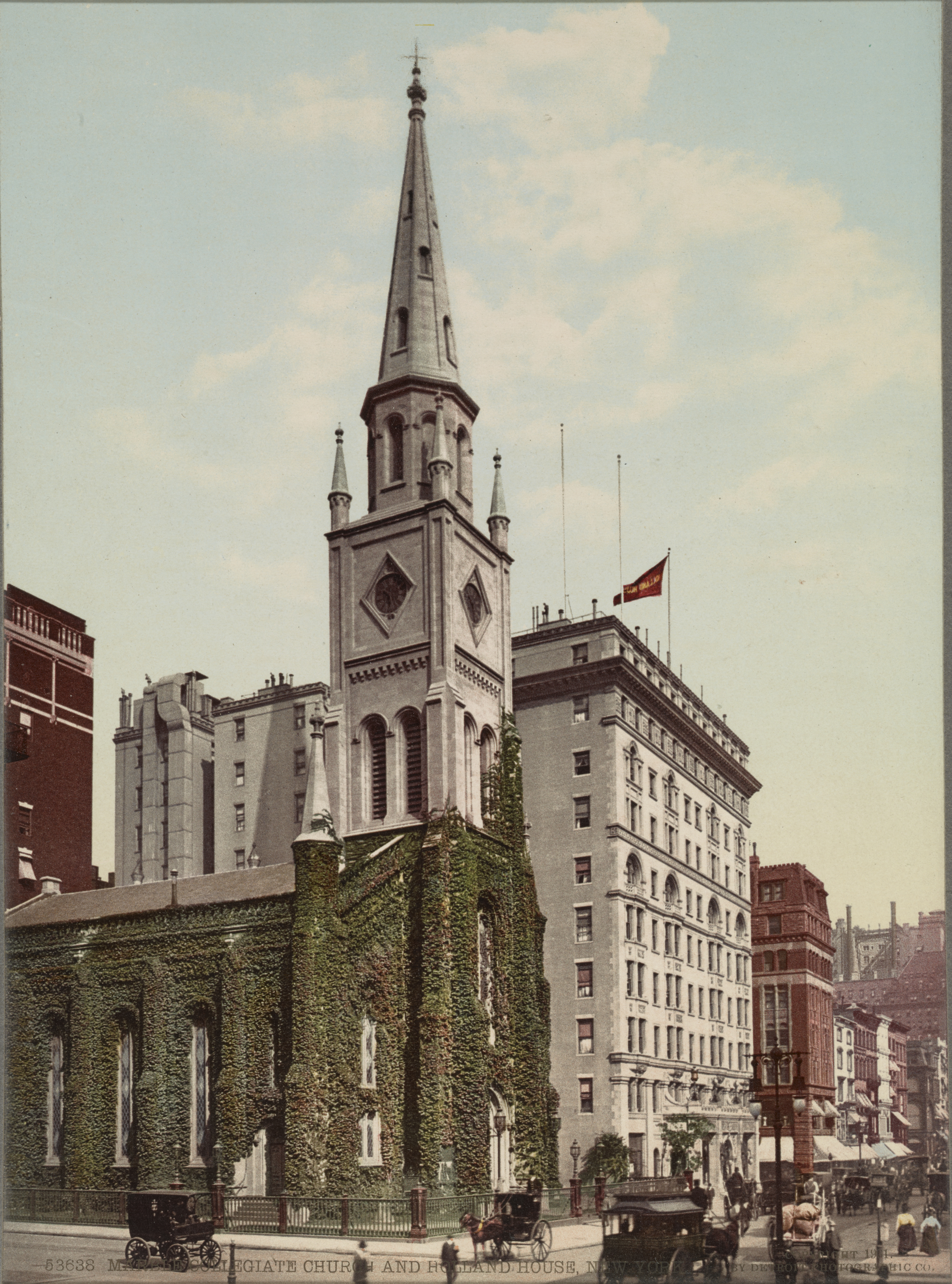
A photochrom postcard, c. 1897–1924

The church congregation was founded in 1628 as the Collegiate Reformed Protestant Dutch Church and was affiliated with the Dutch Reformed Church, a Calvinist church in the Netherlands. During its first 150 years, Marble shared its ministers with the other Collegiate congregations as they developed in the city. This pooling of pastoral ministry was abandoned in 1871. The name "Collegiate" remains as part of the heritage of the four such churches in New York City, and they participate in an administrative unit that oversees physical properties and investments held in common. The other congregations are Middle Collegiate, West End Collegiate, and Fort Washington Collegiate.

Norman Vincent Peale, author of The Power of Positive Thinking, served as senior minister from 1932 to 1984. Under Peale's ministry Marble's influence reached national levels and it became known as "America's Hometown Church". On November 19, 1961, Lucille Ball married her second husband Gary Morton in the church. Following Peale's fifty-two year ministry, Arthur Caliandro served 25 years as the fifth senior minister of Marble Church. In all, he served 42 years on the pastoral staff. During Caliandro's tenure, MarbleVision, the media ministry of Marble Church, was founded, its first woman minister was ordained, and the first women elders received. In addition, the church added its first new stained-glass window in almost 100 years. In 2009, Michael B. Brown, former pastor of Centenary United Methodist Church in Winston-Salem, North Carolina, succeeded Caliandro as senior minister.

The church takes an LGBT-welcoming, open and affirming approach to same-gender relationships and non-cisgender identities. This includes the performing of same-sex marriage ceremonies, a designated queer fellowship (GIFTS), annual participation in the NYC Pride parade and sermons and material on the church website encouraging a historical-critical view of Scripture in opposition to the conservative belief in Biblical Inerrancy.

== Pastors ==
- Daniel A. Poling, 1922–1939
- Norman Vincent Peale, 1932–1984
- Arthur Caliandro, 1984–2009
- Michael B. Brown, 2009–2018
- Michael Bos, 2018–

== Stained glass ==
The nave of Marble Church has ten windows measuring 25 x 5 ft (6.72 x 1.52m). Each window has two semi-circular topped lancets divided by a masonry colonette set within a larger semi-circular arch, characteristic of Romanesque architecture. The windows are punctuated by free-hanging upper galleries.

When the church first opened in 1854, the windows were clear glazed. In 1891 these were replaced with a simple geometric design of blue-green and amber diamond shaped panes. Senior Minister Dr Burrell wanted to fill the nave with a series of windows depicting scenes from the bible although it was over a century before his aspirations were fully realized.

=== Frederick Wilson (1858–1932) ===
The first narrative window to be installed in 1900 depicts Joshua Leading the Israelites by Frederick Wilson. Dublin born Wilson was raised in Liverpool and London. English census records from the late 1870s record him working as a stained-glass artist.

In 1892 he and his wife emigrated to the United States. From 1893 to 1923 he was employed by the Tiffany Studios, creating over 500 windows and glass mosaics making him by far their most prolific artist. A second Wilson window, Moses and the Burning Bush (1901), was installed the following year. Both windows display elements of the American opalescent style pioneered by Tiffany Studios.

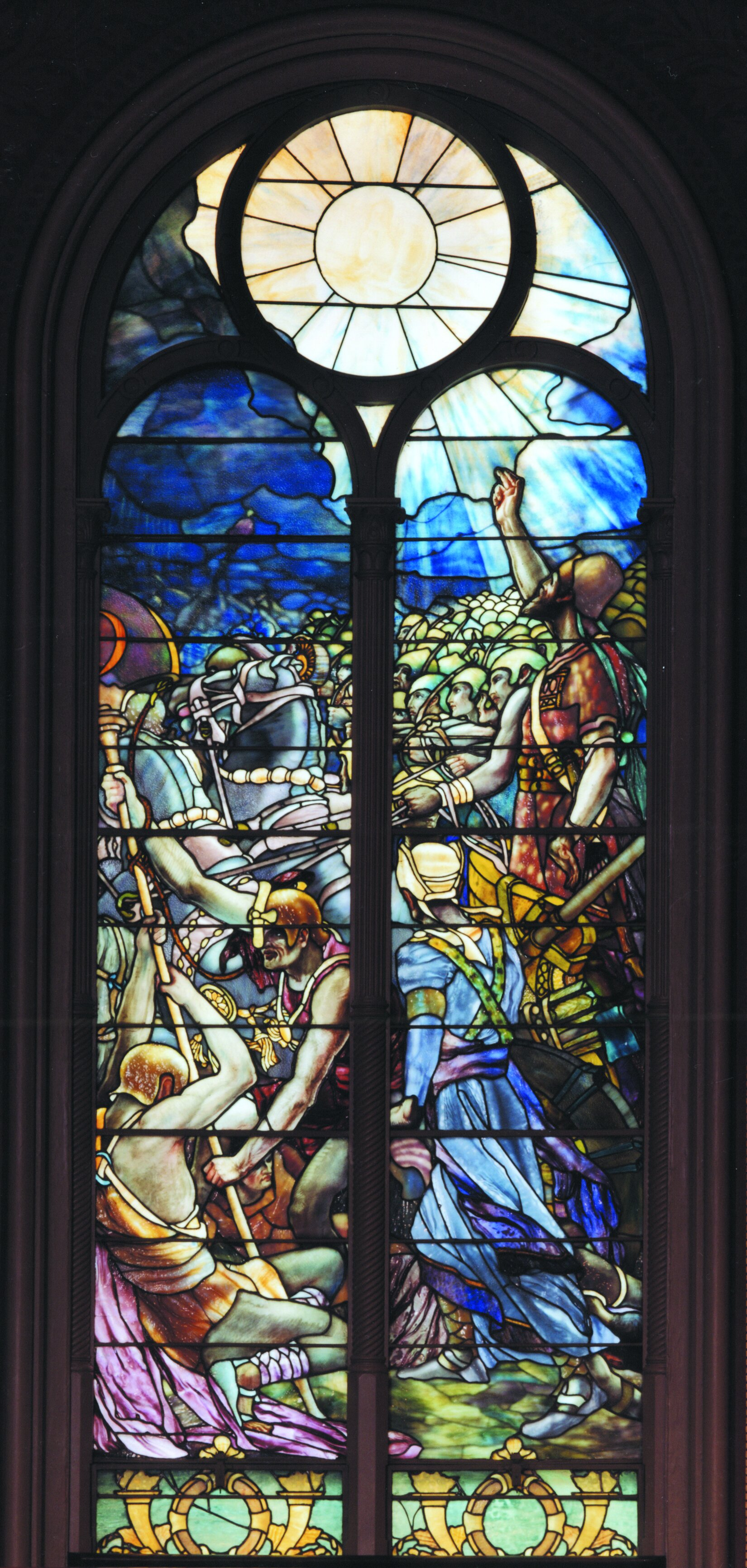

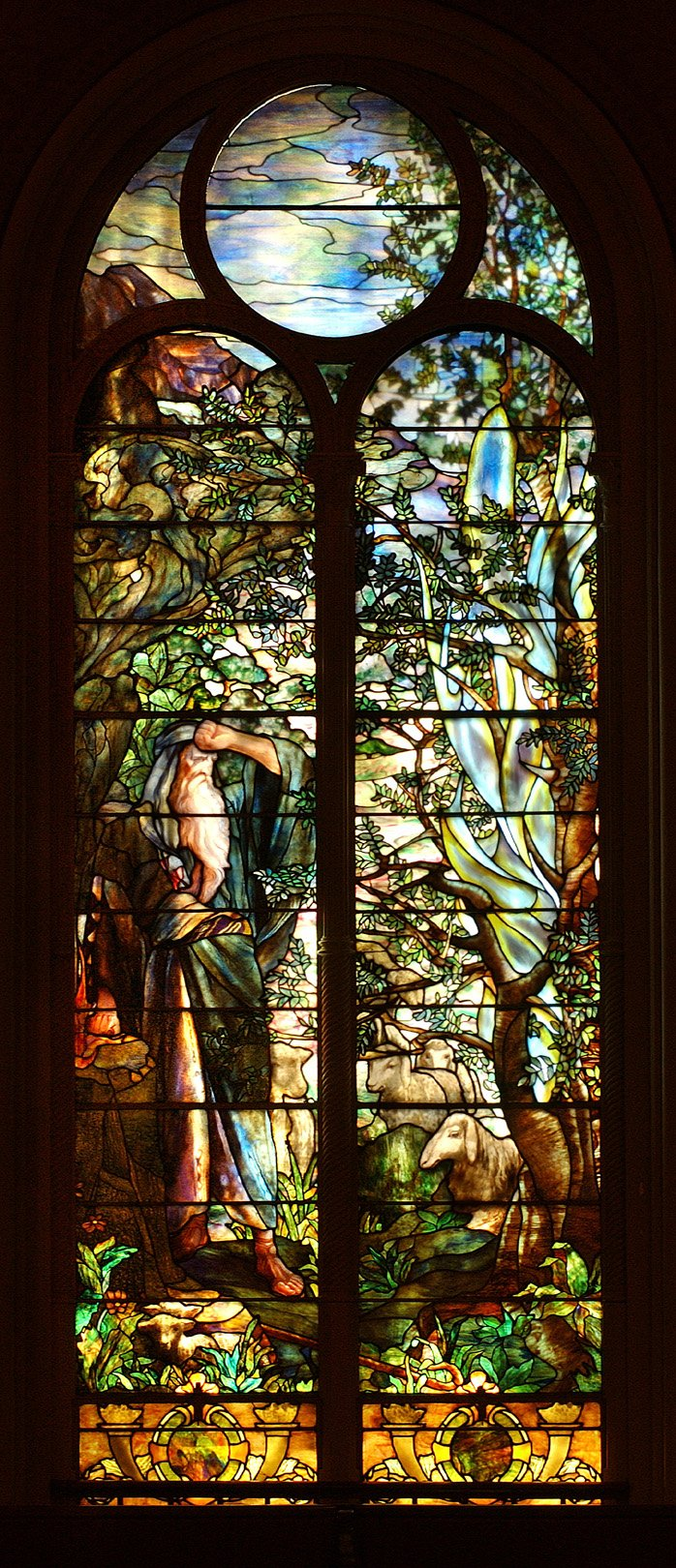

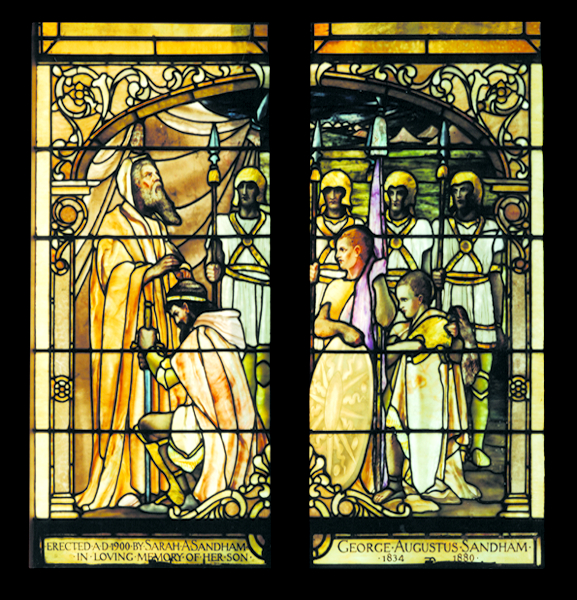

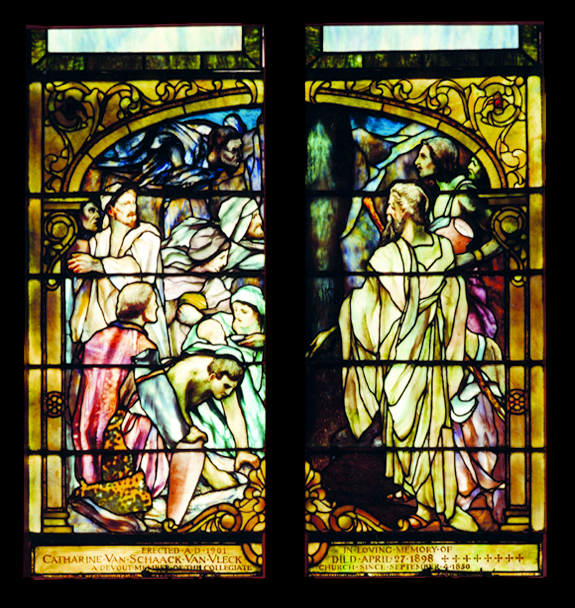

=== Roy Coomber (1930–2016) ===
Almost 100 years passed before any new narrative windows were installed. A committee was formed to continue Dr Burrell's vision and commission narrative pieces for the other eight windows. The first, by Coomber depicts the Crucifixion and Pentecost. Coomber (1930–2016) studied Art at Brighton College and worked for Goddard and Gibbs of London. His work is found across South West England.

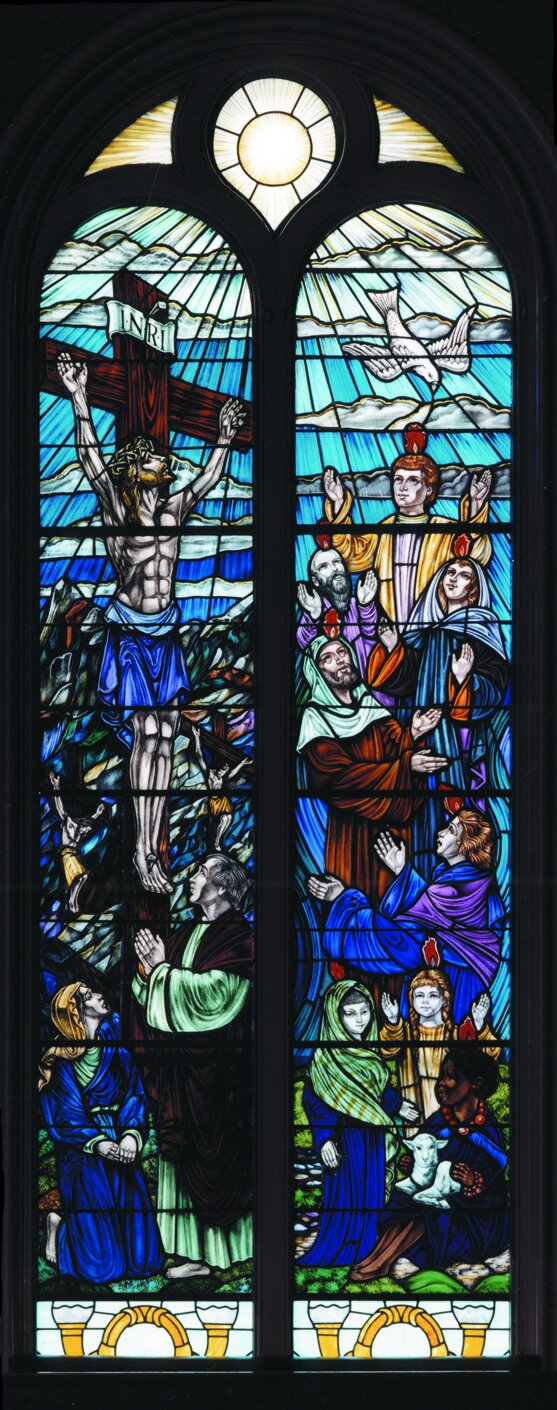

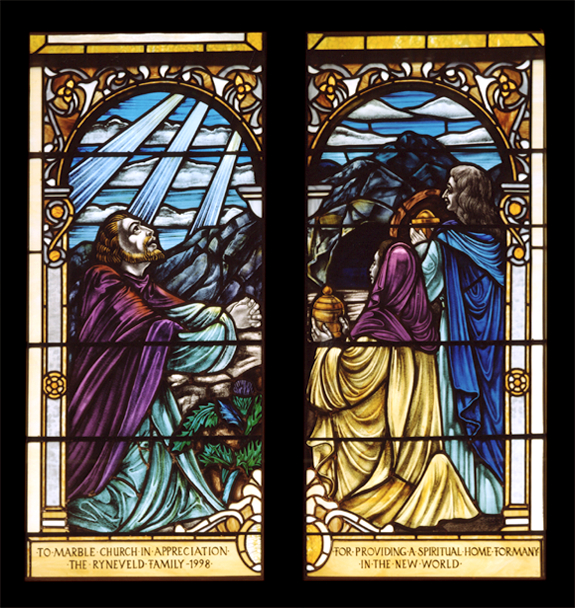

=== Sarah Hall (b 1951) ===
Senior ministers Arthur Caliandro and Edwin G. Mulder set up a committee to supervise the new narrative nave windows. The committee engaged the services of the Rambusch Decorating Company, founded in 1898. Martin Rambusch took a very proactive role, organising meetings with the Church Board, ministers and members of various committees to get them involved in the selection process. This led to commissioning two windows by Canadian artist, Sarah Hall. Nativity was created in 2000. Peaceful Kingdom the following year.

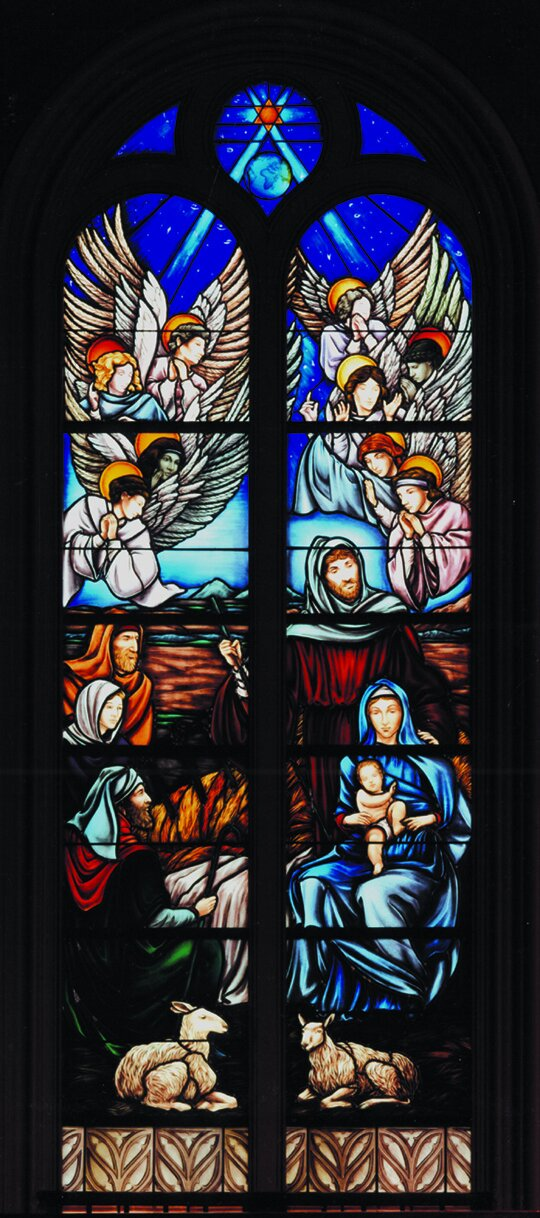

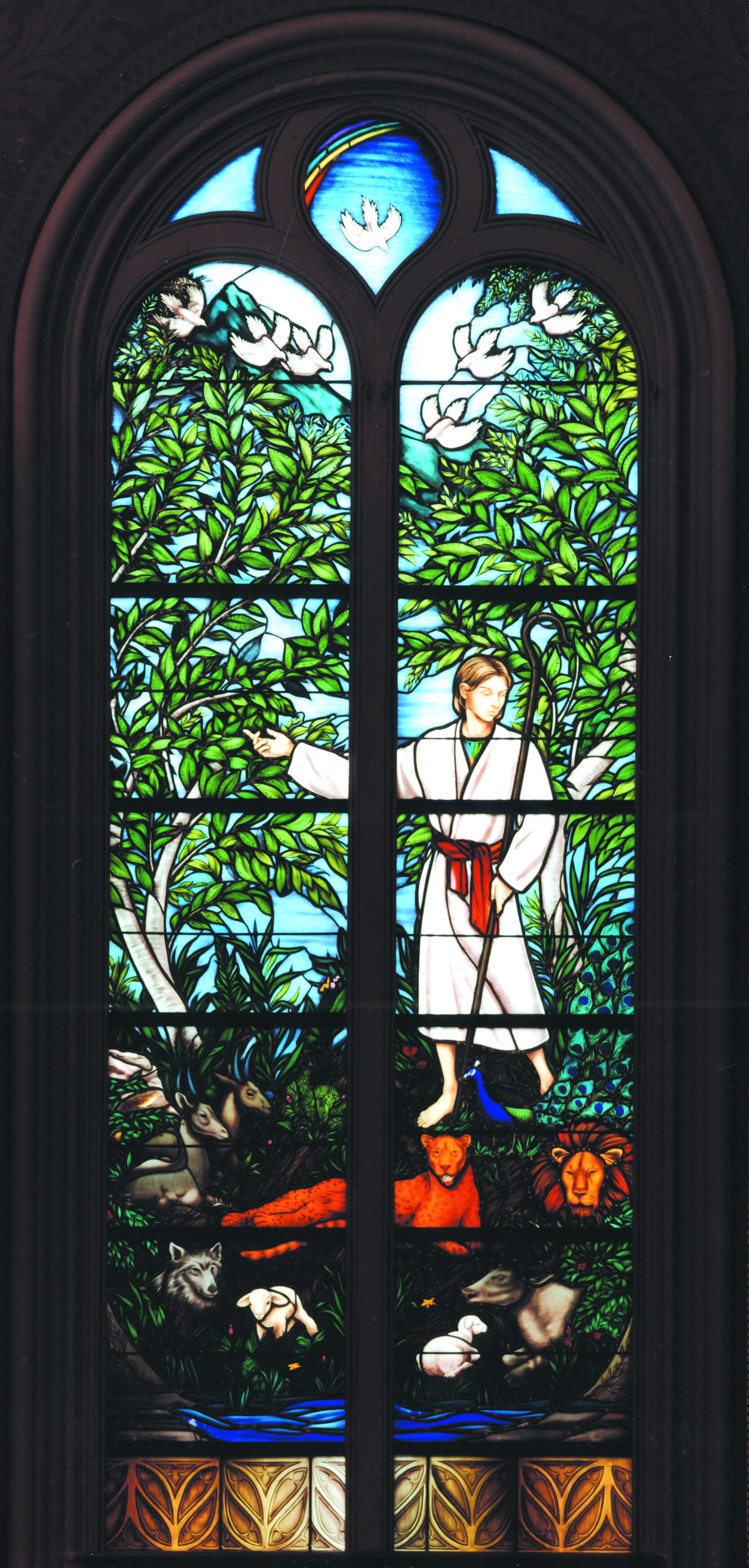

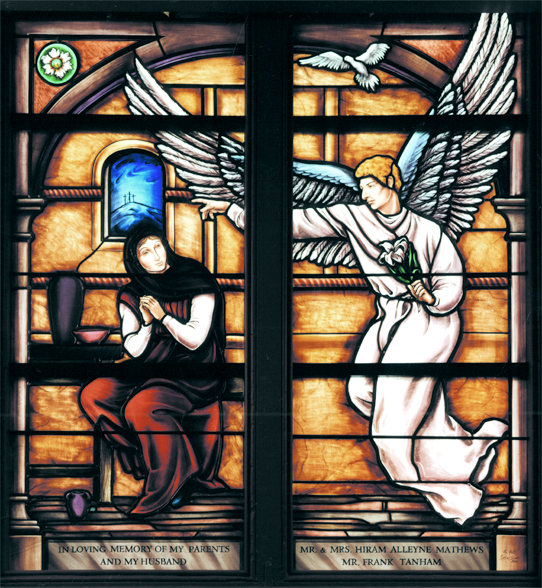

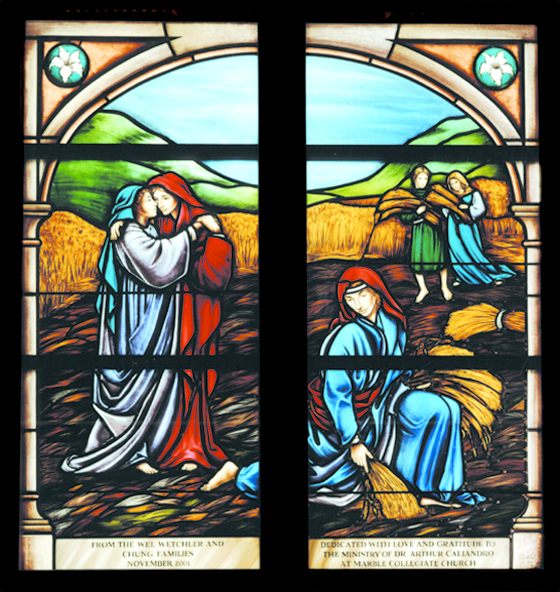

=== Debora Coombs ===
The next two windows were by British born artist Debora Coombs, who studied at Edinburgh, Swansea and the Royal College of Art. Coombs moved to America to design an entire scheme of twenty new stained glass windows for St. Mary's Cathedral (Portland, Oregon) described as 'the first jewel in an American crown'. Work for the Marble Collegiate on Stilling the Storm began shortly after the September 11 terrorist attacks on the World Trade Centre just three miles away. The window shows human response to crisis, just before calm is restored. Coombs' mastery of the medium manifests itself in the way the leadlines joining each piece of glass disappear into the composition. Her second window depicts the Sermon on the Mount (2004).

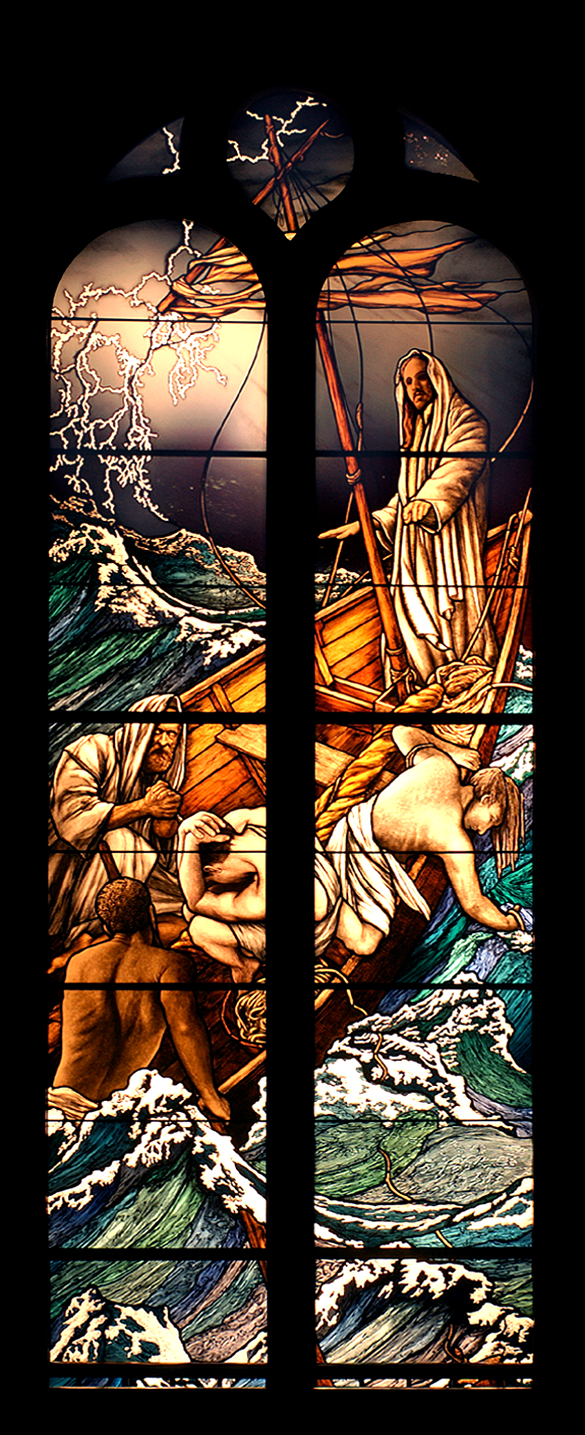

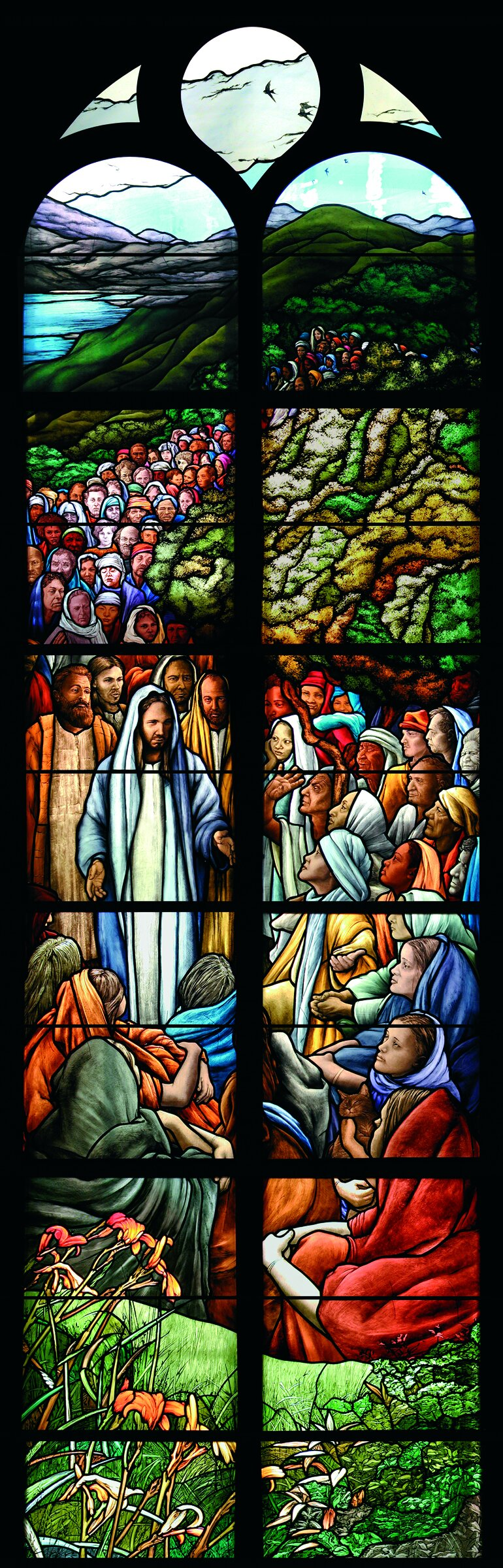

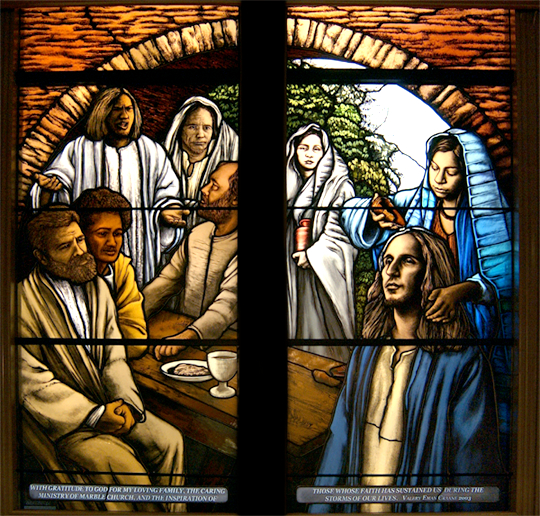

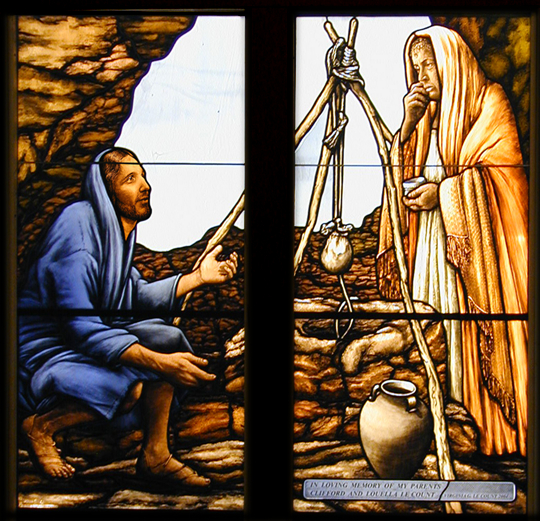

=== Nikki Vogt ===
When Marble approached Rambusch to suggest an artist for the next windows they recommended their former head designer/glass painter Nikki Vogt. Vogt said becoming a stained-glass artist was a surprise. "It's not like you decide to pursue it, it finds you, she says." Vogt worked with Rambusch to create two windows Good Samaritan (2006) and Prodigal Son (2007) with Rambusch fabricating and installing the windows.

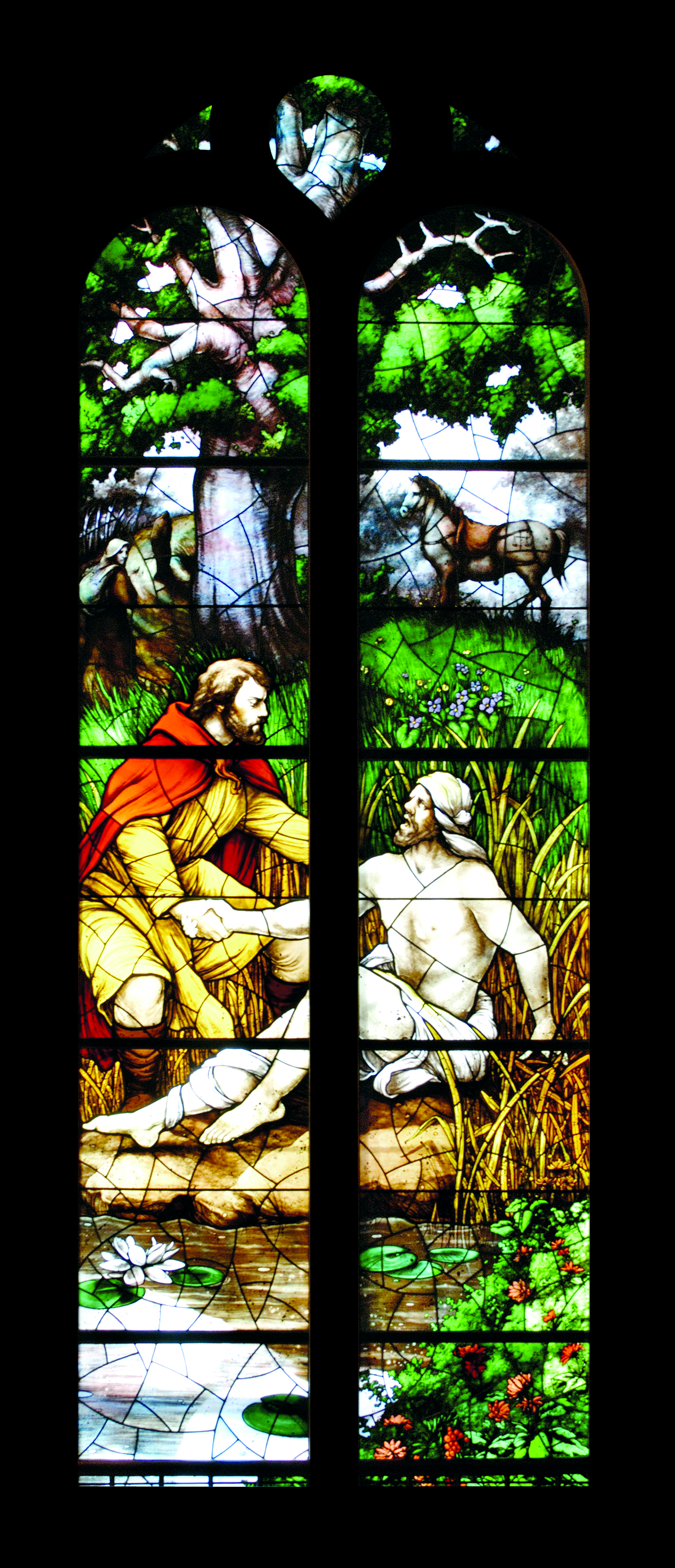

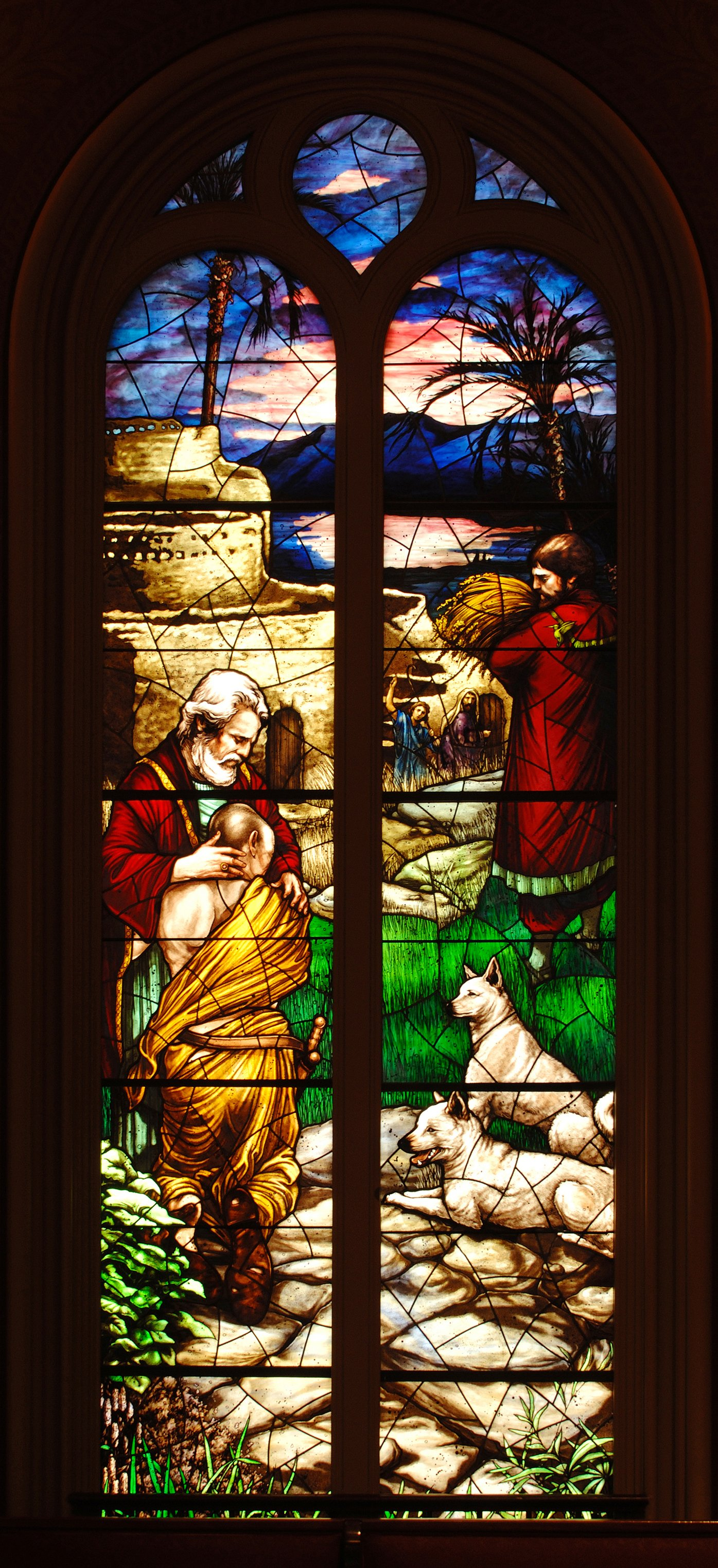

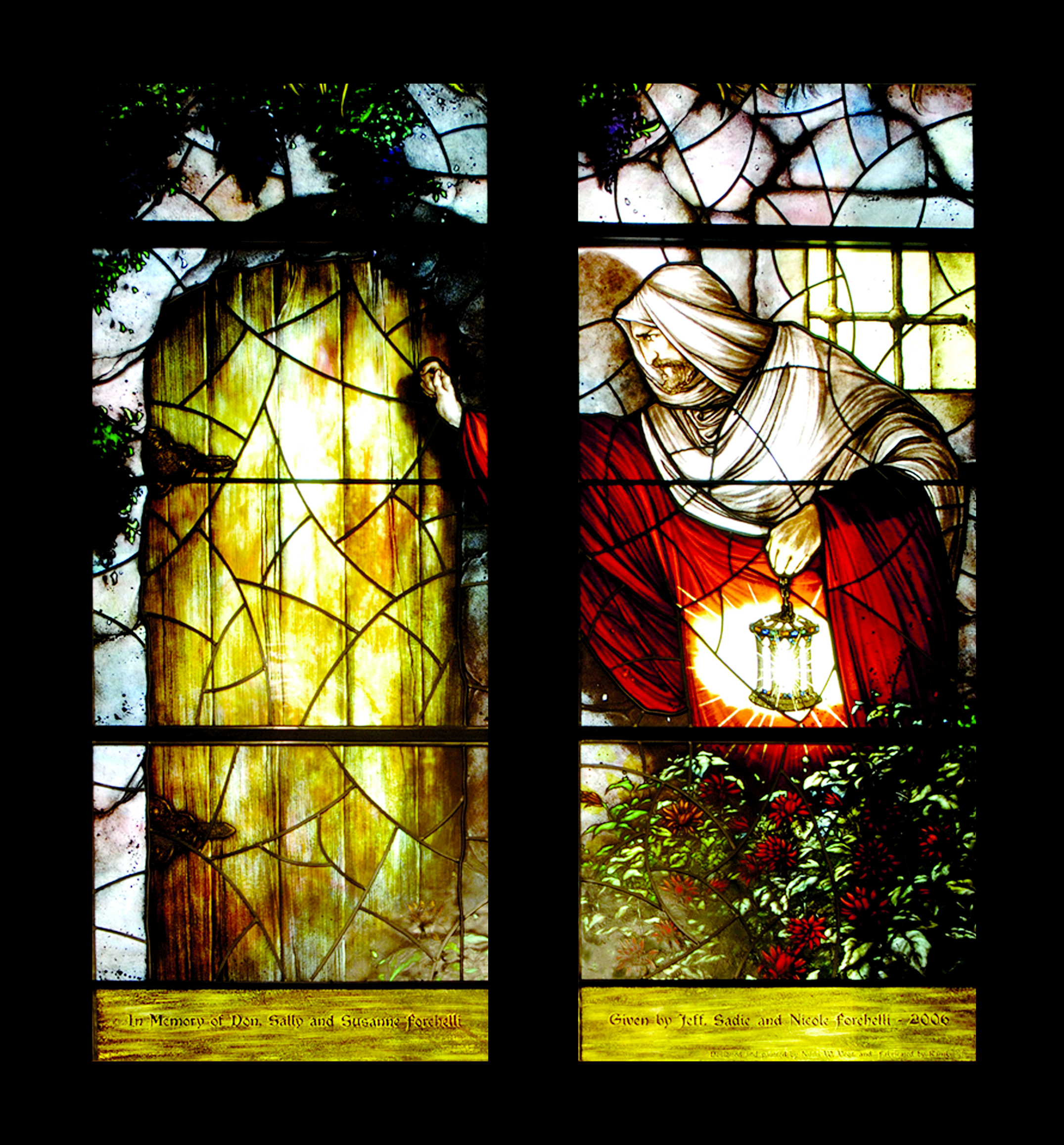

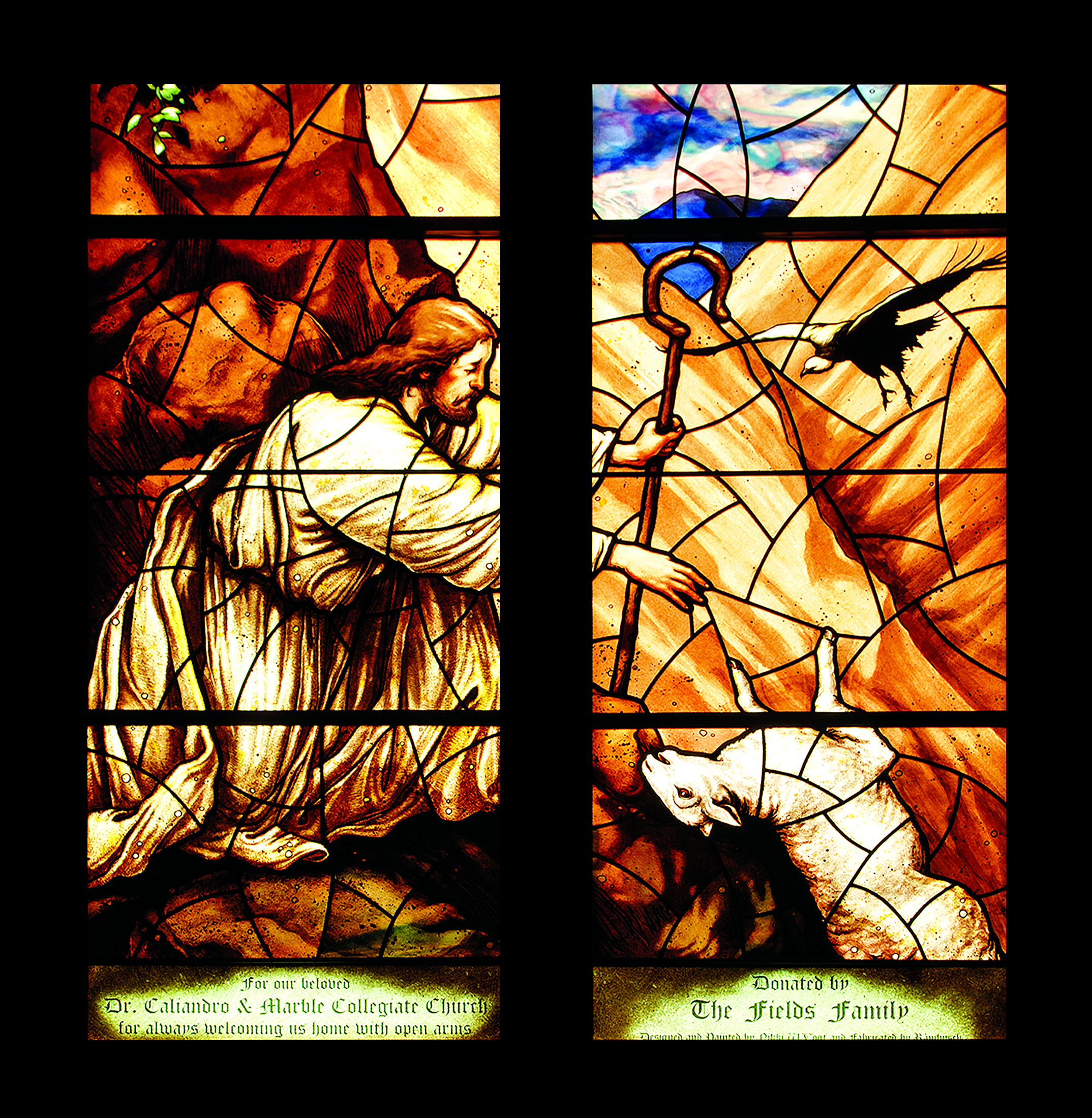

=== Kenneth Crocker ===
While the two Vogt windows were being manufactured, Rambusch engaged English artist Kenneth Crocker to work on the final window depicting The Creation. As late as 2022, Crocker was working for the Willet Houser Company where he was the designated artist for a new window in the First Presbyterian Church of Tulsa documenting its history.

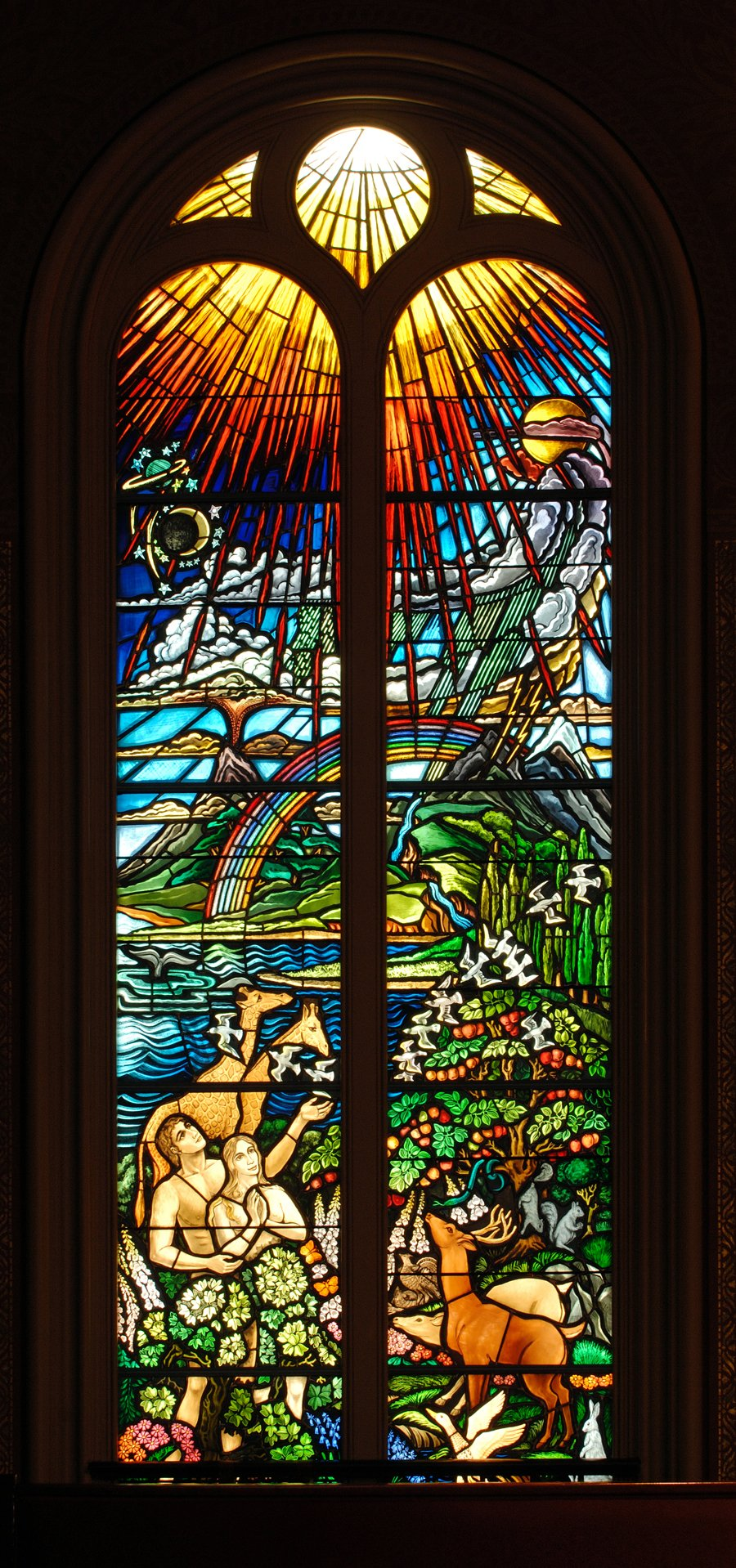

== See also ==
- Oldest churches in the United States
- List of New York City Designated Landmarks in Manhattan from 14th to 59th Streets
- National Register of Historic Places listings in Manhattan from 14th to 59th Streets
