= Old First Reformed Church (Brooklyn) =

Church in Brooklyn, New York

- U.S. National Register of Historic Places
- New York State Register of Historic Places
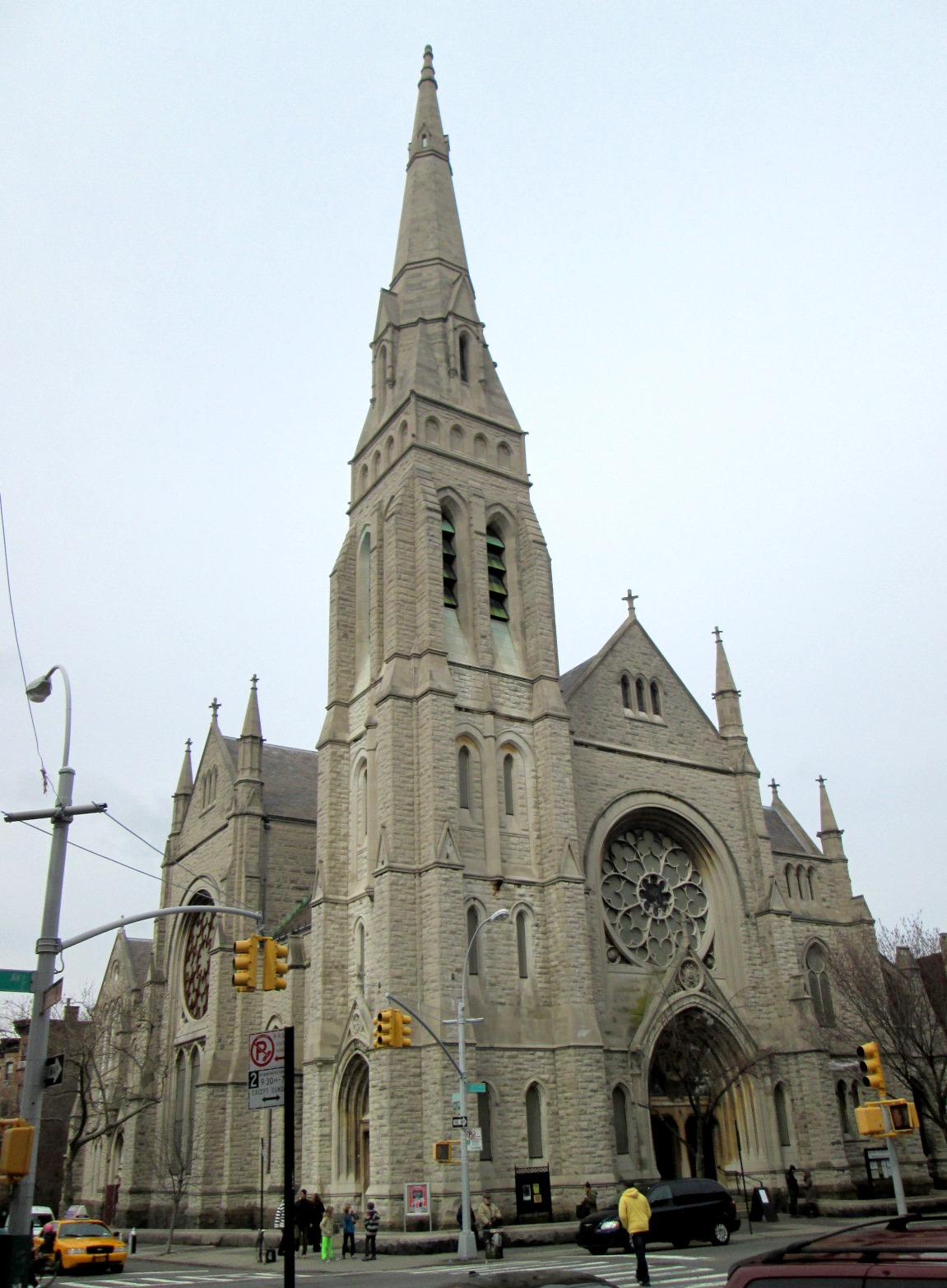
- (2013)

- Location within New York City Location within New York Location within the United States
- Location: 126 7th Avenue; Brooklyn, New York City
- Coordinates: 40°40′24″N 73°58′35″W
- Built: 1888–93
- Architect: George L. Morse
- Architectural style: Late Gothic Revival
- NRHP reference No.: 98000316
- NYSRHP No.: 04701.014789

Significant dates
- Added to NRHP: April 1, 1998
- Designated NYSRHP: November 12, 1997

The Old First Reformed Church in Brooklyn, New York – officially known as The Reformed Dutch Church of the Town of Breukelen – is a historic Dutch Reformed church at 126 7th Avenue on the corner of Carroll Street in the Park Slope neighborhood of Brooklyn, New York, New York. The congregation was founded in 1654 by decree of Governor Pieter Stuyvesant, as one of three "collegiate churches." The current church building was constructed in 1888–1893 and is a Late Gothic Revival style Indiana limestone building on a granite base. It measures 100 feet wide and 162 feet deep. The front facade features a 212-foot-high stone tower and spire.

The church was listed on the National Register of Historic Places in 1998.
