= West End Collegiate Church =

Church in Manhattan, New York

- West End Collegiate Church and Collegiate School
- U.S. National Register of Historic Places
- New York State Register of Historic Places
- New York City Landmark
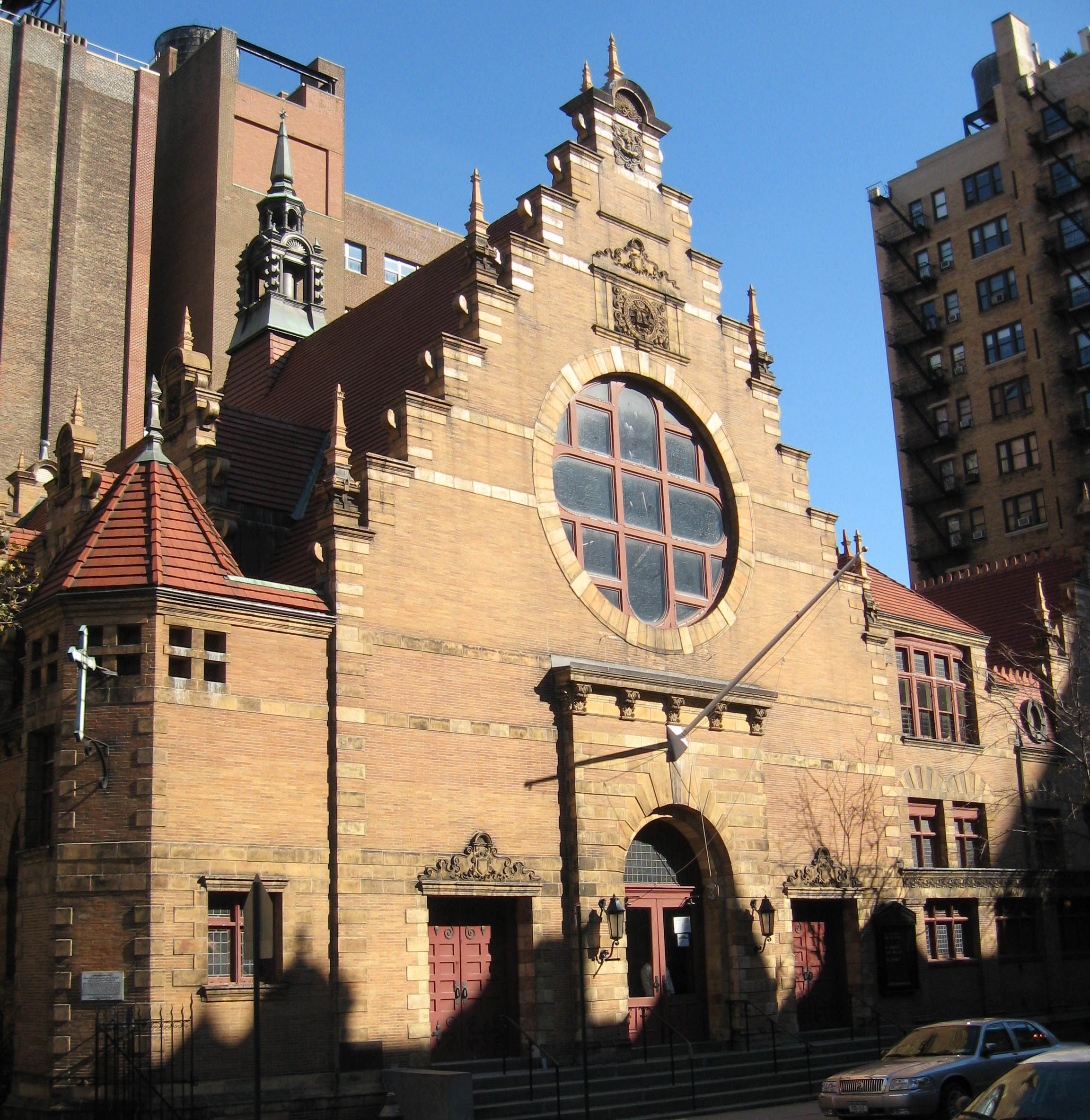

- Location within New York City Location within New York Location within the United States
- Location: West End Ave. and W. 77th St., New York, New York
- Coordinates: 40°46′58″N 73°58′55″W
- Built: 1892
- Architect: Robert W. Gibson
- Architectural style: Dutch-Flemish Renaissance Revival
- NRHP reference No.: 80002729
- NYSRHP No.: 06101.000089
- NYCL No.: 0287

Significant dates
- Added to NRHP: May 6, 1980
- Designated NYSRHP: June 23, 1980
- Designated NYCL: January 11, 1967

The West End Collegiate Church is a church on West End Avenue at 77th Street on Manhattan's Upper West Side. It is part of The Collegiate Reformed Protestant Dutch Church in the City of New York, the oldest Protestant church with a continuing organization in America. The Collegiate Church of New York is dually affiliated with the United Church of Christ (UCC) and the Reformed Church in America (RCA). The building is listed on the U.S. National Register of Historic Places.

The building is also used as a Meetinghouse for The Church of Jesus Christ of Latter-day Saints, who signed a temporary lease to use it due to the remodel of the Manhattan New York Temple and Stake Center.

== History ==
West End Collegiate was built as part of the rapid development of the Upper West Side in the late nineteenth century—from country estates to an urban neighborhood of town houses and, later, apartment buildings. On October 16, 1890, the Consistory of the Collegiate Church instructed the "Committee on a new church site west of Central Park" to price several plots of land of a minimum size of seven lots. The Committee purchased four lots on West End Avenue and three lots on 77th Street for $89,000. A building committee was formed and construction began in 1891. The building stood complete in the fall of 1892 and dedicated on November 20, 1892. On November 19, 1892, The Reverend Henry Evertson Cobb of West Troy, New York was called to become the first minister of the Church.

During World War II the church was a center for the Dutch refugee and relief effort; Princess Juliana of the Netherlands visited twice during the war.

The church buildings were designated a New York City Landmark in 1967 and listed on the National Register of Historic Places in 1980.

The Church of Jesus Christ of Latter-day Saints signed a lease in January 2024 to share use of the facility with the West End Collegiate congregation while the Manhattan New York Temple and Stake Center are under remodel.

== Architecture ==
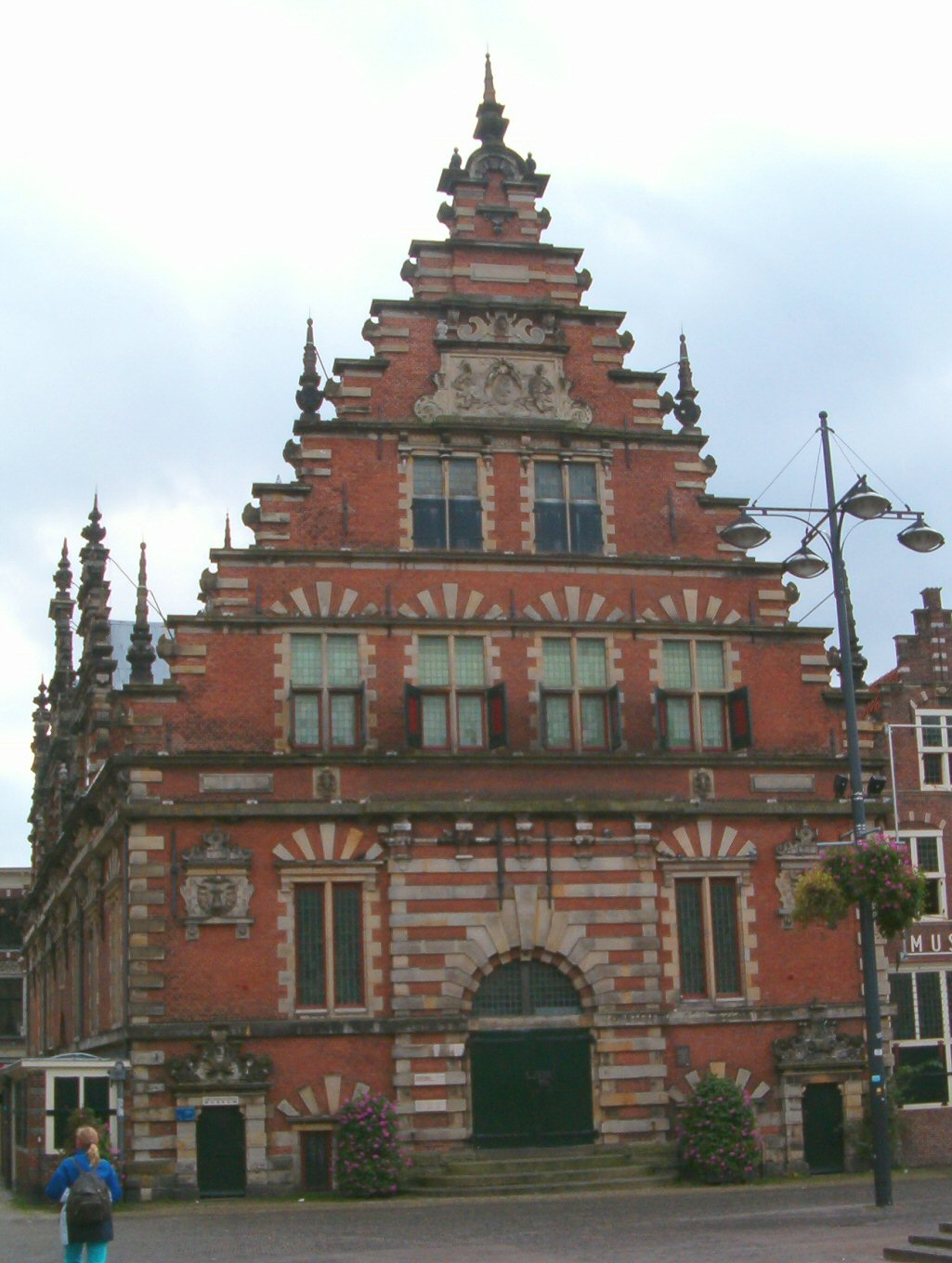
The Vleeshal at the Grote Markt in Haarlem

Architect Robert W. Gibson designed the church in Dutch Colonial style, following the design of the 1606 Vleeshal in Haarlem, the Netherlands. This building has the picturesque qualities of the Gothic, highly valued in the late nineteenth century and deemed especially appropriate to church architecture. Authenticity is enhanced by the choice of long, thin, brown bricks laid in Roman pattern, and by the generous use of quoins and blockings of buff terra cotta. The architect further enhanced the antique effect by inserting several handsome, terra cotta panels carved with the coats-of-arms of the church and of past benefactors. The large, octagonal pulpit is carved from oak. Its panels show the coat-of-arms of the Dutch Reformed Church and the great seal of the Church. The pulpit chairs are carved of oak in Old Dutch style. The stained glass windows were donated and created over the course of several decades; three are by Tiffany Studios and one, the east transept window titled The morning cometh and the shadows flee away, was designed by Clara Miller Burd. In the early 2000s, all the stained glass windows of the church were removed, repaired and reinstalled.

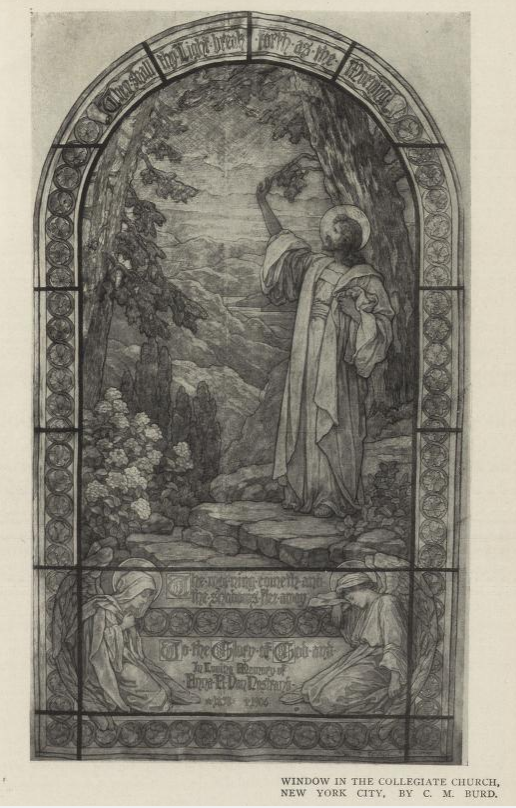
Stained glass window design by Clara Miller Burd for Collegiate Church, New York City

== See also ==
- List of New York City Landmarks
- National Register of Historic Places listings in New York County, New York
