= Pealeism =

American Christian revivalist movement

Peale Foundation
- Wordmarked initials of the Peale Foundation
- Type: Christian ministry and revival movement
- Classification: Protestant (majority Mainline)
- Orientation: Non-denominational
- Scripture: Bible (King James Version) (Note: Although Norman Vincent Peale’s ministry officially published the King James Version of the Bible, its prescribed use was articulated in his book, The Power of Positive Thinking; see power of Jesus.)
- Theology: Liberal Reformed-Wesleyan evangelical
- Polity: Congregational
- President: Rebecca Ehrhardt
- Associations: Federal Council of Churches (1942-1950); Spiritual Mobilization (1944-1961); National Council of Churches (1950-1960); Council of Churches of the City of New York
- Headquarters: 665 Old Quaker Hill Road, Pawling, New York
- Territory: Australia; Canada; Finland; Germany; India; Japan; New Zealand; United Kingdom; United States
- Founder: Norman Vincent Peale
- Origin: 1942; 84 years ago
- Branched from: Reformed Church in America (de facto)
- Separations: Seeker Sensitive movement (1955)
- Places of worship: Marble Collegiate Church, New York City, New York; Lakewood Church, Houston, Texas; Shepherd's Grove, Irvine, California
- Aid organization: The Pittsburgh Experiment; Blanton-Peale Institute & Counselling Centre
- Other names: Foundation for Christian Living (1945-1991); Peale Center for Christian Living (1991-1995)
- Publications: Guideposts
- Official website: pealefoundation.org
- Slogan: Ever Positive
- Logo

Pealeism, known by its namesake as practical Christianity or applied Christianity, and more commonly Positive Thinking, is a non-denominational Christian revivalist movement based on the independent ministry of Norman Vincent Peale and his book The Power of Positive Thinking. It emerged in the 1940s advocating for Christian revival in the United States, primarily emphasizing the practical, rather than creedal, aspects of Christian faith to improve daily life. Pealeism reached its height during the early Fourth Great Awakening before declining throughout the 1960s.

Pealeism’s legacy remains politically, scientifically, and theologically controversial. Its approach to Christian faith, mental health, and politics has been respectively criticized as unbiblical, scientifically flawed, and religiously justifying conservatism and anti-communism during the Cold War.

== History ==
=== Opposition to the New Deal ===
Beginning in 1942, Norman Vincent Peale travelled across the United States to court contacts in business, politics, industry, and religion, which would become the core of the movement surrounding his ministry. In 1945, Peale and his wife, Ruth Stafford Peale, established Guideposts magazine, featuring personal accounts claiming how Christian faith helped overcome personal difficulty.

Peale associated Christianity with American civic life, capitalism, anti-communism, opposing U.S. President Franklin D. Roosevelt’s New Deal, and participated in conservative organizations including the Committee for Constitutional Government and Spiritual Mobilization. He belived Christian revival could encouraging Americans to treat faith as integral to personal wellbeing and be a counter to communist influence.

=== Post-World War II era and Cold War ===
After World War II, the Pealeist movement grew to include the Religio-Psychiatric Clinic and Foundation for Christian Living, which was the administrative core of Peale’s ministry. The two organizations allowed Peale to preach to business executives, industrial workers, and youth outside his immediate congregation. In 1951, the Religio-Psychiatric Clinic was renamed the American Foundation of Religion and Psychiatry, with Peale serving as its president until 1962. The foundation promoted cooperation between clergy and psychiatrists, supported pastoral counselling, and sought to establish Christian faith as integral to mental health.

Peale’s relationships with Federal Bureau of Investigation director J. Edgar Hoover and U.S. President Dwight D. Eisenhower, increased his public reputation and brought his views on religion and national identity to influential circles. He supported campaigns presenting the United States as “one nation under God,” which was part of a broader political and cultural trend towards the prominence of religious language in public life during the 1950s.

=== Decline and institutional reorganization ===
Peale’s ministry remained active during the 1960s, but American religious observance started declining.

Peale stepped down as president of the American Foundation of Religion and Psychiatry in 1962. The foundation subsequently faced financial difficulties by the late 1960s and struggled to maintain the level of support it had the decade prior, reflecting broader changes in the relationship between Christian revivalism and mental-health care.

In 1972, the foundation merged with the Academy of Religion and Mental Health to create the Institutes of Religion and Health.

Peale continued to lecture, write, and participate in religious and media activities until he retired as senior minister of Marble Collegiate Church in 1984. He also received the Presidential Medal of Freedom, the United States’ highest civilian honour.

=== 2016 United States presidential election and influence on Donald Trump ===
Peale’s influence received renewed attention during Donald Trump’s 2016 presidential campaign through the latter’s public accounts of his religious upbringing. Trump attended Marble Collegiate Church with his family, and repeatedly identified Peale as a formative influence. Peale’s influence continues to be relevant in public discourse about Christianity’s role in contemporary American conservatism.

== Beliefs ==
Theologically, Pealeism is Reformed-Wesleyan evangelical and liberal, articulating its namesake’s views in Faith Is the Answer, A Guide to Confident Living, The Art of Real Happiness, The Art of Living, and The Power of Positive Thinking. Peale, however, described himself as theologically fundamentalist and modernist, and argued in the very latter book that Christian faith needed to be pragmatic and scientifically grounded. He further differentiated himself from the institutional church or what he termed “nominal Christianity,” arguing what he preached was democratic, dynamic, organic, and vital in nature, while the former was bureaucratic, callous, elitist, and formal. Because the movement was ministerially independent, though nominally part of Marble Collegiate Church and the broader Reformed Church in America, it didn't adhere to the Heidelberg Catechism. Positioning itself as non-denominational, 75% to 80% of its followers has historically been mainline Protestant, with 10% being Roman Catholics, and the remainder coming from other faiths. The movement’s namesake instead drew on his alma mater’s appreciation for personalism, as espoused by Methodist theologian Borden Parker Bowne, underpinning the very former’s approach to intellectually justifying the Wesleyan doctrine of the real presence of Christ in the Eucharist. (Note: Ohio Wesleyan University's appreciation for Boston personalism influenced Peale, as an alumni, to intellectually justify the real presence of Christ in the Eucharist with the works of Marcus Aurelius, New Thought authors Ralph Waldo Emerson and William James, and later Christian Science founders Mary Baker Eddy and Charles Fillmore.)

=== Nature and accessibility of God ===
The movement’s namesake emphasized God as immanent, omnipresent, and personal, describing him as loving, morally perfect, and capable of promoting personal well-being, with his kingdom being personally within as a gift. God was invoked through affirmative prayer and made accessible through forgiveness and role as the Father. In this context, prayer was understood through Matthew 7:7-8 and Philippians 4:13, being a disciplined means of self-reflection and understanding God, improving one's emotional state, and helping one act more constructively.

=== Power of Jesus ===
Jesus is acknowledged as Lord, though the movement’s namesake primarily emphasizes the very former’s mental, physical, spiritual, and emotional wholeness from God’s power, which Peale called “the art of living.” In this role, Jesus is said to have taught how to live healthily and without guilt; therefore, imitating Christ meant receiving, as a gift of grace, his spiritual nature, and thus God’s power, to shape one’s lived circumstances. The nature of this power however, is portrayed as active and dynamic, instead of coming from established Christian tradition or inherited “passively held” beliefs. Thus, the Bible played a selectively important role; the movement’s namesake, who published it as the King James Version, claimed it was the greatest source of wisdom, especially since disciples recorded what are seen to be readily understandable truths about Christ’s life in the New Testament. The movement’s namesake praised it for its practical wisdom, positive imagery, and remedial thought as a source of healing.

=== Christian libertarianism and nationalism ===
Until 1984, the movement’s namesake politically aligned with Christian libertarianism and Christian nationalism, insisting that faith in God and Jesus was a societal defence against communist influence and a way to restore American society's health, especially at the height of his ministry during the Second Red Scare, viewing those who lived this way as exceptional compared with those who didn’t. He attributed this success to the United States being a Christian nation, thanks to the Founding Fathers' religious faith and belief in freedom and liberty, which he believed communism lacked and, therefore, why it failed politically. Faith, therefore, brought God’s encouragement to the United States as a country, which Peale sought to position as the basis for American nationalism.

=== Nature of sin ===
Given Jesus’s role in Pealeism, it rejects original sin, instead treating it as transitory. The movement’s namesake instead held that the soul is innately good, shaped by lived experience and thought. Those who embraced the lessons Jesus lived out were personally strengthened. In contrast, those who failed to do so fell into sin, which brought emotional pain and feelings of inferiority, fear, and negativity. Because people equated this with sin, especially during the early Fourth Great Awakening, those who lived this way were seen as a threat to American societal health. They believed this could be forgiven through confession, faith in God, and trust in his forgiveness. At times, this was equated with self-confidence or surrendering to God.

=== Eschatology and salvation ===
Eschatologically, the movement’s namesake was postmillennial. Peale believed the soul was personally immortal, enjoying pre-existence and eternal life, which he claimed parapsychology can scientifically prove. He explained physical death is merely death of the corporeal embodiment of the personality, soul, and mind, with the essence continuing to exist in “the great cloud of witnesses” mentioned in Hebrews 12:1.

== Controversy ==
=== Psychological soundness ===
Despite the popularity of The Power of Positive Thinking, Peale’s approach was criticized by theologians, psychologists, psychiatrists, and other religious commentators. Some argued that his techniques reduced otherwise complicated emotional and social problems to appear readily solvable. They objected to the emphasis on avoiding negativity, arguing that optimism couldn’t simply dismiss anxiety, grief, anger, and suffering. Other critics questioned if these techniques were scientifically sound.

=== Credibility of the American Foundation of Religion and Psychiatry ===
The American Foundation of Religion and Psychiatry experienced difficulties reconciling Christian counselling with psychiatry. Some medical professionals and researchers objected to its claims about the role of faith in treating mental illness, particularly questioning the veracity of its evidence for faith healing and the tendency to wards faith as a necessity for mental health. The foundation also faced disagreements over its research methods, professional standards, and the degree to which evangelism should be part of counselling.There was also misgivings within the foundation, including the precision of its scientific and clinical goals. Overall, this weakened the movement’s premise that Christian faith and psychology could be treated as a unified scientific approach.

=== 1960 United States presidential election and anti-Catholicism ===
During the 1960 United States presidential election, Peale was controversially associated with the Citizens for Religious Freedom, a group of Protestant clergy who objected to the candidacy of John F. Kennedy because he was Roman Catholic. They argued a Catholic president could be unduly influenced by the Holy See, which was widely criticized as religiously prejudiced, and damaged Peale’s reputation. He withdrew from the group and offered to resign as minister of Marble Collegiate Church, although they didn’t accept his resignation. Peale later described his involvement as a serious mistake.

=== Theological criticism ===
Peale’s practical approach faith was criticized for reducing Christianity as a means to attaining individual goals while largely neglecting theological reflection, the meaning of suffering, and selflessness. Critics such as Reinhold Niebuhr argued that Peale overly emphasized self-assurance and individual success over obligations to Christian faith and role of original sin. Some regarded his approach as reducing religion to reassurance and practical achievement. William Lehmann Jr., a contributor of Concordia Theological Monthly, argued that Peale’s interpretations of the soul, God, sin, faith and Christ were inconsistent with traditional Christianity. He also criticized the latter for treating faith principally as an emotional experience.

== Notable people ==
- Dwight D. Eisenhower – 34th President of the United States (1953-1961), 1st Supreme Allied Commander Europe (1951-1952)
- Richard Nixon – 37th President of the United States (1969-1974), 36th Vice President of the United States (1953-1961), United States Senator from California (1950-1953)
- Joel Osteen – Senior Pastor of Lakewood Church (1999-present)
- Bobby Schuller – Lead Pastor on Hour of Power (2012–present), Senior Pastor of Shepherd’s Grove (2013–present)
- Robert Schuller – Lead Pastor on Hour of Power (1970–2006), Senior Pastor of Crystal Cathedral (1980–2006)
- W. Clement Stone – American businessman, philanthropist, and author
- Donald Trump – 45th and 47th President of the United States (2017–2021, 2025–2029), Co-Chairman of the New York Vietnam Veterans Memorial Commission (1982–1985), Chairman of The Trump Organization (1971–2017)
- Fred Trump – Chairman of The Trump Organization (1929–1971)
