= List of Christian movements =

A Christian movement is a theological, political, or philosophical interpretation of Christianity that is not generally represented by a specific church, sect, or denomination.

== Religious ==
- The modern 24-7 Prayer Movement: a movement spanning denominations focusing on the pursuit of God as the focus of one's life. The International House of Prayer in Kansas City, Missouri, is a visible example of this concept.
- Anti-Judaism: the Quartodeciman controversy erupted in the 2nd century, and the anti-Quartodeciman position became Catholic doctrine at the First Council of Nicea, severing Easter from Passover both thematically and calendrically. Christians, thereafter, including all major Protestant churches, have felt justified in considering themselves as having replaced the Jews, believing that a new covenant has superseded and abrogated the original covenants with the Israelites and later Jews.
- British Israelism or "Anglo-Israelism": the Christian belief that many modern people of British and European heritage are descended from the Ten Lost Tribes or directly descended from the Tribe of Judah and are thereby the heirs of the covenants with Abraham, Isaac, and Jacob.
- Charismatic movement or Neo-Pentecostalism: Pentecostal beliefs and practices spread to churches outside the Holiness tradition.
  - Catholic Charismatic Renewal
- Charismatic Restorationism: Pentecostal beliefs and practices together with restorationist elements that reject denominationalism. Closely related to Latter Rain Movement.
- Christ the Only Way Movement: a programme in the Philippines to promote evangelism.
- Christian ecumenism: the promotion of unity or cooperation between distinct religious groups or denominations of the Christian religion.
- Christian Family Movement: a U.S. movement of parishes and small groups of families that meet to reinforce so-called Christian values.
- Christian fundamentalism: seeks to assert a fundamental set of Christian beliefs against the influences of perceived later changes to Christianity; became a movement of separation from the Mainline Protestant churches.
- Christian Identity: a label applied to a variety of loosely affiliated groups and churches with white supremacist beliefs.
- Christian naturism: a movement which believes that God never intended that people should be ashamed of their bodies.
- Christian Torah-submission: a movement of Christians whose adherents pursue a lifestyle that holds to evangelical Christian theology while observing some of the Hebrew Bible's dietary, purity, and other laws.
- Christian Zionism (called "Christian Restorationism" until the mid-twentieth century): the belief that the return of the Jews to the Holy Land and the establishment of the State of Israel is in accordance with Biblical prophecy and a necessary precondition for the return of Jesus and his reign on Earth.
- Confessing Movement: a neo-Evangelical movement within several mainline Protestant churches that seeks to return those churches to what its members see as greater theological orthodoxy.
- Conservative evangelicalism: a division of evangelicalism characterized by reformed theology.
- Convergence Movement: a move among evangelical and charismatic churches in the United States that seeks to blend charismatic worship with liturgies from the Book of Common Prayer and other liturgical sources.
- Creationism: there are several schools of creationist thought, but all of them adhere to the belief that human beings were divinely created over a short period of time (which distinguishes them from theistic evolutionists).
- Eastern Catholicism: a movement on the part of some Eastern churches that seek to enter into visible communion with the Bishop of Rome that originated after the East–West Schism.
- Ecumenical movement: a movement working towards inter-church cooperation and increased Church unity.
- Emerging church movement: a trans-denominational movement that seeks to reshape Christian epistemology, doctrines, and practices so they will fit into a postmodern mold.
- Evangelicalism: a worldwide Protestant movement that maintains the belief that the essence of the gospel consists of the doctrine of salvation by faith in Christ's atonement.
- Free Grace Movement: originally a reaction against the inroads that Reformed soteriology made into Dispensationalism, it has since developed away from some dispensational soteriology, like its understanding of repentance.
- Focolare Movement: an international organization that promotes the ideals of unity and universal brotherhood.
- Grace Movement: this movement originated in the 1930s and embraces the mid-Acts position, a dispensational system of Bible interpretation.
- Hebrew Roots movement: emphasizes the Jewish roots of Christianity and the understanding of Jesus and the New Testament in the light of some Old Testament (Hebrew Bible) observances and Jewish tradition.
- House church movement: a movement that promotes church growth through house churches.
- Holiness movement: a Wesleyan movement that originated in the 19th century, it emphasized a personal experience of holiness and gave rise to Pentecostalism and the Charismatic Movement.
- House Church or Simple Church movement: a worldwide shift of Christian expression in small groups rather than in formal institutionalized buildings.
- Jesus movement: the Jesus movement was an evangelical Christian movement that originated on the West Coast of the United States in the late 1960s and early 1970s and primarily spread throughout North America, Europe, and Central America before it subsided in the late 1980s. Members of the movement were called Jesus people or Jesus freaks.
- Lesbian and Gay Christian Movement: officially, a British movement which seeks to create a more inclusive church; unofficially, part of a larger number of LGBT-welcoming church programs.
- Liberal Christianity (Protestant) or Modernism (Catholicism): a school of Christian thought which rose as a direct challenge to more conservative traditional Christian orthodoxy.
- Mission movement: a movement working on church growth via cross-cultural missions and evangelism
- Missional Movement: a modern movement of Christianity that seeks to emphasize the call of the church towards a mission type of lifestyle focused on themes like social justice and inculturation.
- Neo-orthodoxy: emphasis on the transcendence of God, the reality of sin, and an existentialist encounter with the word of God.
- New Thought movement: belief in metaphysical interpretation of the Bible. Phineas Quimby is generally considered the founder of New Thought. His influence on the New Thought movement can be traced through Unity Church, Divine Science, Religious Science, Understanding Principles for Better Living Church and Seicho-No-Ie.
- Nyevangelism: a Swedish Protestant revivalist movement
- Oxford Movement: a nineteenth-century movement to more closely align Anglicanism with its Roman Catholic heritage; it is part of Anglo-Catholicism, a movement that continues into the 21st century.
- Paleo-Orthodoxy: evaluating later theology in light of the writings of the early Church.
- Pealeism: a revival movement in the United States based on the ministry of Norman Vincent Peale, primarily emphasizing the practical aspects of Christianity to improve daily live; it’s argued to be part of the Fourth Great Awakening.
- Peace and Truce of God: the first mass peace movement in history, originating in the 10th century as a result of violence against Christian institutions that took place after the fall of the Carolingian dynasty
- Pentecostalism: the gifts of the Holy Spirit are a normal part of the "Full Gospel".
- Pietism: a movement within Lutheranism, highly influential on Protestantism, that combines an emphasis on biblical doctrine with an emphasis on individual piety and living a holy Christian life.
- Prosperity Theology (sometimes referred to as the prosperity gospel, the health and wealth gospel, or the gospel of success): a Christian religious doctrine that financial blessing is the will of God for Christians and that faith, positive speech, and donations to Christian ministries will always increase one's material wealth.
- Positive Christianity: a movement within Nazi Germany which blended ideas of racial purity and Nazi ideology with elements of Christianity.
- Postmodern Christianity: an understanding of Christianity that has been influenced by continental philosophy.
- Reform Movements
  - Protestantism: Protestantism originated from certain efforts to reform the Roman Catholic Church.
  - Religious orders: many religious orders in the Catholic Church began as reform movements.
- Restoration Movement, also known as the Stone-Campbell movement: a group of religious reform movements that arose during the Second Great Awakening and sought to renew the whole Christian church "after the New Testament pattern", in contrast to divided Christendom, of Catholicism and Protestantism.
- Restorationism (Christian primitivism): the belief that a purer form of Christianity should be restored using the early church as a model.
- Revival movement: a movement aimed at promoting a work of the Holy Spirit in the conversion of large groups to become disciples of Jesus Christ.

== Political ==
- Christian anarchism: the rejection of all authority and power other than God, it sometimes even included the rejection of the organized church. Christian anarchists believe that Jesus of Nazareth was an anarchist and that his movement was reversed by strong Judaist and Roman statist influences.
- Christian communism: a form of religious communism which is based on the teachings of Jesus and the way of life of the Apostles and the first Christians.
- Christian Democracy: a political ideology, born at the end of the 19th century, largely as a result of the papal encyclical Rerum Novarum of Pope Leo XIII, in which the Vatican recognizes workers' misery and agrees that something should be done about it, in reaction to the rise of the socialist and trade-union movements. The Christian Democrats came out of this movement.
  - Distributism: a sub-movement seeking the dispersal of both economic and political power, originated and/or popularized by GK Chesterton and Hilaire Belloc.
- Christian left: those who hold a strong Christian belief and share left-wing or liberal ideals.
- Christian libertarianism: those who are committed to non-aggression and property rights, strongly opposed to state coercion and (military, social, and economic) interventionism as unjustifiable on Christian ethical grounds, advocate the promotion of virtue by persuasion only and either minimal government or no government (see Christian anarchism).
- Christian right: encompasses a spectrum of conservative Christian political and social movements and organizations characterized by their strong support of social values they deem traditional in the United States and other western countries.
- Christian socialism: those on the Christian left whose politics are both Christian and socialist, broadly including Liberation theology and the doctrine of the social gospel.
- Dominionism: a movement among socially conservative Christians to gain influence or control over secular civil government through political action – seeking either a nation governed by Christians or a nation governed by a Christian understanding of biblical law.
- Evangelical left: part of the Christian evangelical movement but who generally function on the left wing of that movement, either politically or theologically, or both.
- Green Christianity: Christian-based opposition to climate change and other environmental problems
- Liberation theology: an important and controversial movement in the theology and praxis of the Roman Catholic Church after the Second Vatican Council. It had broad influence in Latin America and explores the relationship between Christian theology and political activism, particularly in areas of social justice, poverty, and human rights. It gave priority to the economically poor and oppressed of the human community. See also Black theology, Dalit theology, Feminist theology, Minjung theology and Queer theology.
- Progressive Christianity: focuses on the biblical injunctions that God's people live correctly, that they promote social justice and act to fight poverty, racism, and other forms of injustice.
- Rexism: a Belgian fascist movement derived from the Roman Catholic social teachings concerning Christus Rex, and it was also the title of a conservative Catholic journal
- Social Gospel movement: a Protestant Christian intellectual movement that was most prominent in the late 19th century and early 20th century. The movement applies Christian principles to social problems, especially poverty, liquor, drugs, crime, racial tensions, slums, bad hygiene, poor schools, and the danger of war. The Social Gospel leaders overwhelmingly held a postmillennial eschatology.

== Philosophical ==
- Arminianism: theological movement emphasizing human free will, conditional election, and resistible grace.
- Augustinianism: theological movement developed from the teachings of Augustine of Hippo, emphasizing divine grace, original sin, and God's sovereignty in salvation.
- Christian asceticism: a life which is characterised by refraining from worldly pleasures and luxuries, such as wealth, private possessions, and alcohol.
- Calvinism: theological movement emphasizing God's sovereignty, predestination, and salvation by grace.
- Christian atheism: a position in which the belief in the God of Christianity is rejected, but the moral teachings of Jesus are valued.
- Christian deism: deist philosophy which places emphasis on the moral teachings of Jesus.
- Christian existentialism: a school of thought founded by the 19th-century Danish philosopher and father of existentialism, Søren Kierkegaard, which emphasizes subjectivity and deep reflection on purpose, the apparent absurdity of life and the cosmos, the inevitable despair of an awakened existence, and finding the authenticity of self by faith in God.
- Christian vegetarianism: the dietary practice of vegetarianism or veganism based on the idea that Jesus, the twelve apostles and the early Jewish followers of Jesus (the Nazarenes) were vegetarians.
- Christian pacifism: Christian churches, groups or communities teaching that Jesus was himself a pacifist who taught and practiced total nonviolence and that his followers must do likewise.
- Molinism: theological movement developed that emphasizes God's middle knowledge and seeks to reconcile divine sovereignty with human free will
- Muscular Christianity: movement that emphasized physical fitness, moral character, and masculine virtue as expressions of Christian faith
- Neoplatonist Christianity: appeared in the 3rd century and influenced Christian philosophy and theology
- Occamism: theological and philosophical movement, emphasizing divine freedom, nominalism, and the distinction between faith and reason.
- Open theism: theological movement emphasizing human freedom and a dynamic relationship between God and creation, holding that some future free actions remain undetermined until they occur.
- Postmodern Christianity: an understanding of Christianity that has been influenced by the postmodern trend in 20th-century continental philosophy, associated with literary deconstruction, postliberal or narrative theology, and the Emerging church movement.
- Process theology: a school of theology influenced by process philosophy, emphasizing a dynamic relationship between God and creation in which God interacts with and is affected by temporal events.
- Scotism: theological and philosophical, emphasizing the univocity of being, the primacy of Christ, and the freedom of the will.
- Thomism: theological and philosophical, emphasizing the harmony of faith and reason, natural law, and Aristotelian philosophy in Christian theology.
- Weak theology: a form of postmodern Christianity that emphasizes the idea of the weakness of God.
- Quiverfull: considers childbearing in marriage a Christian duty, emphasizes the continual role of Providence in controlling whether or not a woman conceives, and eschews all forms of human-mediated contraception. It generally involves the complete submission of the wife to the husband; women generally do not work and children are homeschooled.
- Wedding of the Weddings in Poland: considers the wedding celebration as a deeply religious celebration that should not be distorted by alcohol consumption ("Jesus should enter the wedding house and not be driven away by alcohol")

== See also ==
- Christian denomination
- List of Christian denominations
- Liturgical Movement
- Political Catholicism
