= Helen Hadsell =

Contesting personality and public speaker (1924–2010)

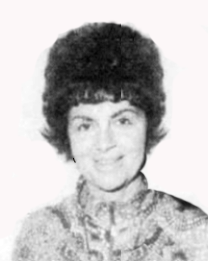
- Hadsell in 1974
- Born: Helen Barbara Daeschel; June 1, 1924; Aberdeen, South Dakota, U.S.
- Died: October 30, 2010 (aged 86)
- Other name: Helene Hadsell
- Occupation: Public speaking
- Years active: 1959–2010
- Known for: Winning contests

Helen Hadsell a.k.a. Helene Hadsell (June 1, 1924 – October 30, 2010) was an American widely known as the "contest queen". She entered and won many contests for items and for all-expense paid trips. She also won a house which was showcased at the 1964–65 New York World's Fair. Later she lectured and held workshops on positive thinking. A "Doctor of Metaphysics", she was the author of the popular book The Name It and Claim It Game: with WINeuvers for WISHcraft.

== Early life and family ==
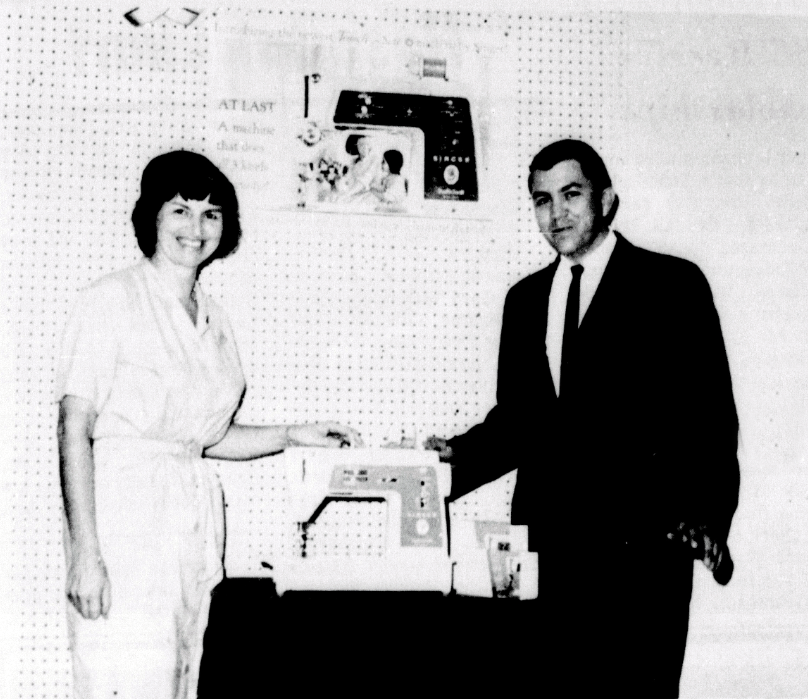
Helen Hadsell poses with a sewing machine she won in a contest.

Helen Barbara Daeschel was born in 1924 and raised in Aberdeen, South Dakota. She attended Central High School there, where she was a member of the school choir.

At age 18, she left home for Vancouver, Washington, where she found employment as a file clerk in a shipping yard. She met and married Pat Hadsell, who was from Denton Texas, during World War II.

The couple later settled in Grand Prairie, Texas, and they had three children. She was a homemaker who was also president of the Grand Prairie Community Chorus, a Girl Scout leader, and on the board of her local PTA. In 1958, she entered the Mrs. America Pageant and made it past the first round, before losing in the Fort Worth division finals.

In 1959, the family moved from Grand Prairie to Irving, Texas. She became the society news editor for the Irving News-Record, which became the "Strictly Personal" column for the Irving News Texan. After having been named to a supermarket magazine advisory board, a local paper described Hadsell as "an enterprising girl if ever there was one."

== Contesting ==
In Hadsell's era, there was an activity known as "contesting", in which people would dedicate their time and efforts towards winning sweepstakes, where winners are chosen at random among those who have entered and the usual strategy was to submit as many entries as possible, and consumer skill contests, in which prizes were won by submitting some kind of writing extolling a particular product, often "In 25 words or less". Such enthusiasts were known as "contestors" or "contest bugs". There were national magazines and newsletters with contesters as the targeted audience.

The Hadsells started entering contests in 1948, as a family hobby, focusing on the skill contests. In 1949, she won a Toni Home Permanent Kit as a 48th-through-168th place prize in a contest run by Skillern's Departmental Drug Stores. However, for the first ten years or so, they almost never won.

This changed after Hadsell took a correspondence course in contest writing and learned that contest judges were, as she said in an interview a few years later, "looking for something different, coined words or phrases and humor. I'd say humor has won for me more than anything. I have another saying – pun for the money." Hadsell's husband Pat assisted with the writing of a number of the contest entries.

By 1957, the family was starting to win contests more frequently, including the Hadsells' six-year-old son winning some toy guns for naming a pony. In 1959, Hadsell told a local newspaper columnist that she had just won an electric food mixer for coming up with a name for a new kind of cake, and that she had won two other mixers in contests during the preceding year.

In 1963, Hadsell was selected as president of a Dallas area writing and contesting club, known as the Competriots, many of whose forty members were published writers of fiction, poetry, or textbooks who were now focusing on contests. The members traded contest information and entry blanks.

By early 1964, the family said they had won many prizes, ranging from the mundane such as lawn-mower blade sharpeners to a trip to Disneyland; the latter was followed by trips to Washington, D.C., and Venice. Nonetheless, Hadsell thought that they hadn't yet "won any of the big prizes, like cars or trips around the world."

But that soon happened. The Formica Corporation had an exhibit at the 1964–65 New York World's Fair which showed a house where all interior walls, and many of the appointments and furnishings, were made of the company's laminated plastic. As part of this, the company ran a $100,000 contest, the grand prize of which was a $50,000 replica of the house to be built anywhere in the United States, lot included. Contestants had to fill out an entry form at either the World's Fair or at any of a number of Formica model homes that had been built around the country, one of which was in the Dallas area; the form itself asked the entrant for short responses regarding what they liked about the house and what suggestions they had for future Formica products. Hadsell was one of 1.5 million people to submit entries. She won the contest, a result announced when a marketing director for Formica Corporation came to Dallas to present the Hadsell family with a model of the house to be built. She attributed the win to her creativity. At the time, the Hadsells said they were unsure regarding which town they would have the house built in; it was eventually built in Irving, and the Hadsells lived there for a number of years.

== Author and lecturer ==
Around two years after she won the house, Hadsell began to change her focus. In late 1967, Hadsell sponsored a seminar in Dallas on mind control. In 1968 she was part of a lecture series in Dallas on subjects related to psychic abilities and mental potential; her topic was the power of positive thinking. By 1970 she was editor of the Mind Control Newsletter and had attended a conference on parapsychology in France. In early 1972 she said that she had entered no national contests at all the two years prior, saying "I've gone into so many more meaningful and exciting experiences." Her lecture appearances grew to the point where they took place throughout the Midwest.

In 1971, she authored the book The Name It and Claim It Game: with WINeuvers for WISHcraft, which gave some of her hints for how to win contests, and also delved into her philosophy of "believe you can win and you will". It was published by DeVorss & Company, an established California publisher known for its focus on New Thought topics. As of 1982, the book was on its seventh printing.

By 1972, Hadsell had established a relationship with José Silva and his Silva Mind Control approach, and some of her talks then and in years to follow were sponsored by the Silva organization. Hadsell received training in the approach from Silva's Institute of Psychorientology in Laredo, Texas, and subsequently did teaching there. In 1980, she was the contact point for Silva's seminars in the Dallas area.

By 1973, Hadsell had received a distance–learning "doctorate in metaphysics", specifically psychics and counseling, via correspondence education from the Brotherhood of the White Temple in Sedalia, Colorado, an unaccredited institution that had been founded by Maurice Doreal.

During this period, she reframed some of her prior experiences. She said that in 1959 she read Norman Vincent Peale's book, The Power of Positive Thinking and she credited the book with much of her success. After reading the book she began entering and winning contests. Her first win was an outboard motor in a contest sponsored by Coca Cola. Next she won a bicycle for her daughter, and then trips to Europe, Disneyland and New York. She claimed that her ability to win contests came from the "projection of energy each person possess" which she called "auric energy". She championed the phrase "Anything the mind can conceive – and believe – it can achieve," which in a slightly different wording was earlier popularized by personal development guru Napoleon Hill and has been reformulated by many others. She lectured in England, Canada and throughout the United States. She further shared that the contests she won were something she felt ahead of time that she would win, including the Formica home. She reported that she had picked out a lot and had plans drawn up even before she was declared the winner. Similarly, she said she had acquired passports and required immunizations before winning a foreign trip.

The cover of her 1971 book read under her name, "The Woman Who Wins Every Contest She Enters". This claim was repeated, in one form or another, in newspaper profiles about Hadsell during the 1970s. But as a 1982 Orlando Sentinel story on contesting pointed out in reference to Hadsell's claims, in reality even those who were good at winning contests did not win every time. She claimed to have developed telepathic communication with members of her family, especially her son Chris. She stated that the same projection of energy which she called "auric energy", also helped facilitate telepathy. In 1973 she taught a class which covered telepathy, clairvoyance, and psychic healing at Tarrant County Junior College.

Hadsell lectured and conducted workshops throughout the United States and Canada. Some Dallas-area colleges hosted her lectures. Among the topics discussed: ESP and self awareness and positive thinking. She said that everyone had at least some powers of ESP and clairvoyance, if they were recognized and developed.

== Later years ==
Hadsell self-published two books during the 2000s, both dealing with her spiritual beliefs and episodes from her life, and also self-published a novella. In 2007 a short humorous poem of hers, "Where's Grandma?", appeared in the Saturday Evening Post.

Hadsell died in 2010 at age 86.

== Books ==
- Hadsell, Helen (1971). The Name It and Claim It Game: with WINeuvers for WISHcraft. Santa Monica, California: DeVorss & Co. ISBN 0-87516-119-7. Several revised editions came out in the 1970s. Subsequently updated and republished as: Hadsell, Helene; Wilman, Carolyn (2020). Contesting: The Name It & Claim It Game: WINeuvers for WISHcraft. Oshawa, ON: 7290268 Canada Inc. ISBN 978-0993925450.
- Hadsell, Helene (2002). In Contact With Other Realms: An Adventurer's Experiences in Awareness. AuthorHouse. ISBN 978-0759679160. Subsequently updated and republished as: Hadsell, Helene; Wilman, Carolyn (2020). In Contact With Other Realms: An Adventurer's Experiences in Awareness. Oshawa, ON: 7290268 Canada Inc. ISBN 978-0993925474.
- Hadsell, Helene (2007). Confessions of an 83-Year-Old Sage: The GLAD-SAD-MAD of Life. Subsequently updated and republished as: Hadsell, Helene; Wilman, Carolyn (2021). Confessions of an 83-Year-Old Sage: The GLAD-SAD-MAD of Life. Oshawa, ON: 7290268 Canada Inc. ISBN 978-0993925498.
- Hadsell, Helene (2008). A Man Called Friday. Subsequently updated and republished as: Hadsell, Helene; Wilman, Carolyn (2023). A Man Called Friday. Oshawa, ON: 7290268 Canada Inc. ISBN 978-1777319410.
