= Foremost =

Foremost may refer to:

- Foremost (software), a forensic data recovery program
- Foremost 105, a British Government tugboat (1945–1947)
- Foremost 106, a British Government tugboat (1945–1947)
- Foremost, Alberta, a village in Canada
- Foremost Airport, in Alberta, Canada
- Foremost Formation, a geological formation in Alberta, Canada
- Foremost Dairy Products, a southern US company (1929–1931)
- Foremost Group, a New York-based shipping company
- Foremost, a Canadian equipment company founded by Bruce Nodwell
- Foremost Insurance, part of Farmers Insurance Group
- Foremost-McKesson, a name previously used by the McKesson Corporation
