= Bowersville, Ohio =

- Village
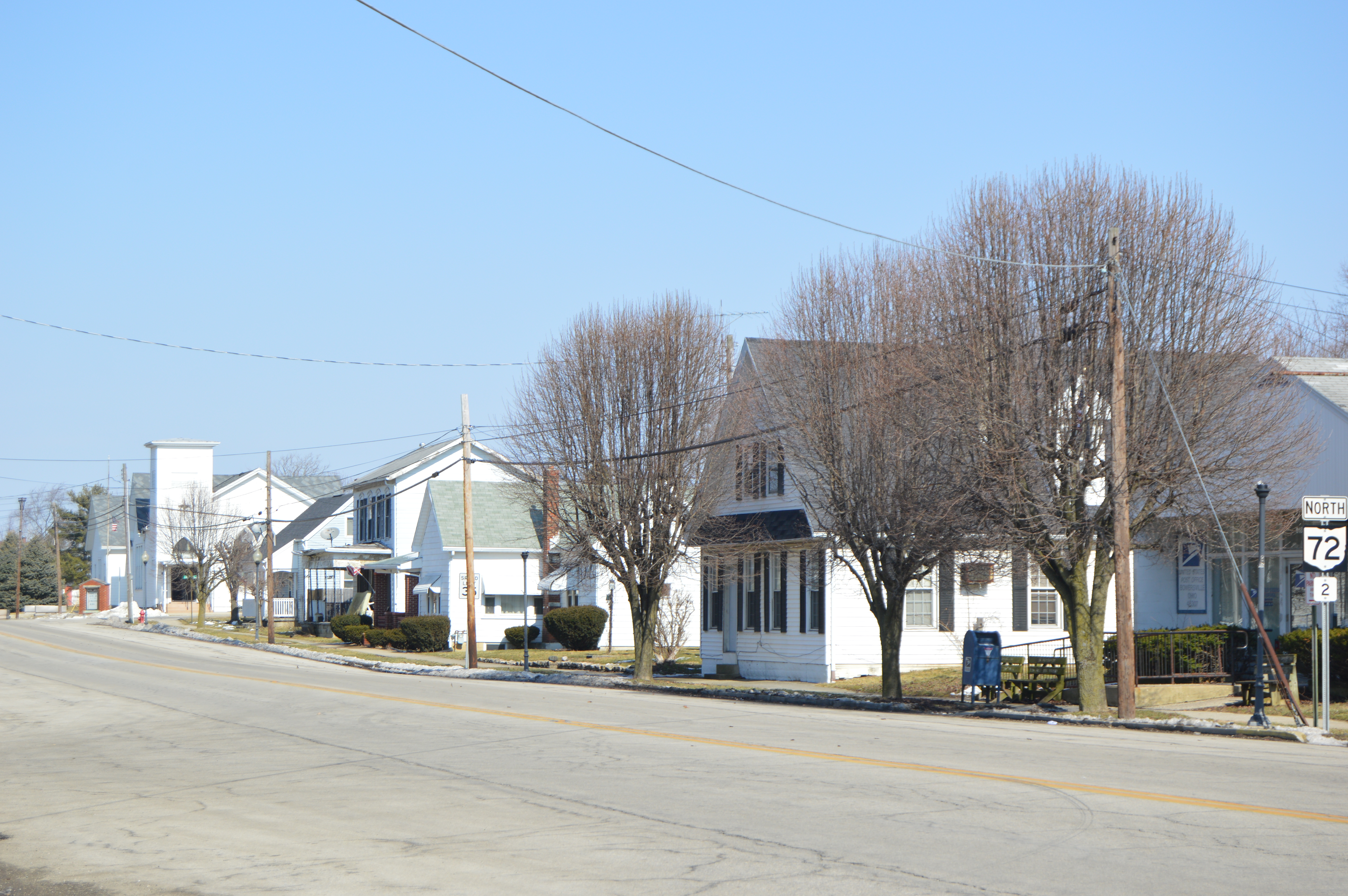
- Maysville Street

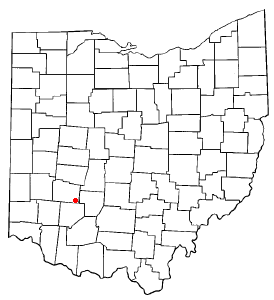
- Location of Bowersville, Ohio

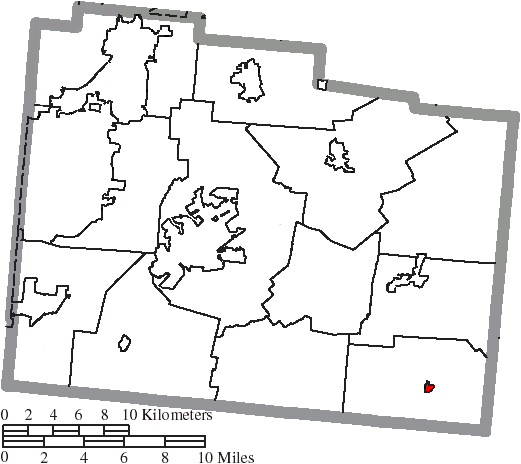
- Location of Bowersville in Greene County
- Coordinates: 39°34′51″N 83°43′24″W
- Country: United States
- State: Ohio
- County: Greene

Area
  - Total: 0.17 sq mi (0.43 km^{2})
  - Land: 0.17 sq mi (0.43 km^{2})
  - Water: 0 sq mi (0.00 km^{2})
- Elevation: 1,096 ft (334 m)

Population (2020)
  - Total: 261
  - Estimate (2023): 266
  - Density: 1,577.7/sq mi (609.17/km^{2})
- Time zone: UTC-5 (Eastern (EST))
  - Summer (DST): UTC-4 (EDT)
- ZIP code: 45307
- Area codes: 937, 326
- FIPS code: 39-07930
- GNIS feature ID: 2398157

Bowersville is a village in Greene County, Ohio, United States. The population was 261 at the 2020 census. It is part of the Dayton Metropolitan Statistical Area.

== History ==
Bowersville was laid out in 1848, and named for Peter Bowermaster, a first settler. A post office called Bowersville has been in operation since 1847.

== Geography ==
According to the United States Census Bureau, the village has a total area of 0.15 square miles (0.39 km^{2}), all land.

== Demographics ==
Historical population
Census	Pop.	Note	%±
1870	193		—
1880	84		−56.5%
1900	370		—
1910	297		−19.7%
1920	312		5.1%
1930	310		−0.6%
1940	316		1.9%
1950	362		14.6%
1960	327		−9.7%
1970	358		9.5%
1980	329		−8.1%
1990	225		−31.6%
2000	290		28.9%
2010	312		7.6%
2020	261		−16.3%
2023 (est.)	266	▲	1.9%
U.S. Decennial Census

=== 2010 census ===
As of the census of 2010, there were 312 people, 119 households, and 89 families living in the village. The population density was 2,080.0 inhabitants per square mile (803.1/km^{2}). There were 134 housing units at an average density of 893.3 per square mile (344.9/km^{2}). The racial makeup of the village was 97.1% White, 0.6% African American, 0.3% from other races, and 1.9% from two or more races. Hispanic or Latino of any race were 2.2% of the population.

There were 119 households, of which 37.0% had children under the age of 18 living with them, 58.0% were married couples living together, 14.3% had a female householder with no husband present, 2.5% had a male householder with no wife present, and 25.2% were non-families. 19.3% of all households were made up of individuals, and 10.1% had someone living alone who was 65 years of age or older. The average household size was 2.62 and the average family size was 2.99.

The median age in the village was 36 years. 26% of residents were under the age of 18; 8.1% were between the ages of 18 and 24; 29.6% were from 25 to 44; 23.4% were from 45 to 64; and 13.1% were 65 years of age or older. The gender makeup of the village was 49.0% male and 51.0% female.

=== 2000 census ===
As of the census of 2000, there were 290 people, 111 households, and 85 families living in the village. The population density was 2,101.3 inhabitants per square mile (811.3/km^{2}). There were 121 housing units at an average density of 876.7 per square mile (338.5/km^{2}). The racial makeup of the village was 98.28% White, 0.34% Native American, 0.34% Asian, 0.34% from other races, and 0.69% from two or more races. Hispanic or Latino of any race were 0.34% of the population.

There were 111 households, out of which 36.0% had children under the age of 18 living with them, 61.3% were married couples living together, 12.6% had a female householder with no husband present, and 23.4% were non-families. 20.7% of all households were made up of individuals, and 9.9% had someone living alone who was 65 years of age or older. The average household size was 2.61 and the average family size was 3.01.

In the village, the population was spread out, with 24.5% under the age of 18, 10.7% from 18 to 24, 29.7% from 25 to 44, 22.8% from 45 to 64, and 12.4% who were 65 years of age or older. The median age was 38 years. For every 100 females there were 108.6 males. For every 100 females age 18 and over, there were 102.8 males.

The median income for a household in the village was $36,406, and the median income for a family was $38,846. Males had a median income of $31,250 versus $25,625 for females. The per capita income for the village was $14,132. None of the families and 2.2% of the population were living below the poverty line, including no under eighteens and 8.3% of those over 64.

== Notable people ==
- William Grange, professor and author
- Norman Vincent Peale, minister and author
