= Vietnam Veterans Plaza =

Plaza in Manhattan, New York

- United States
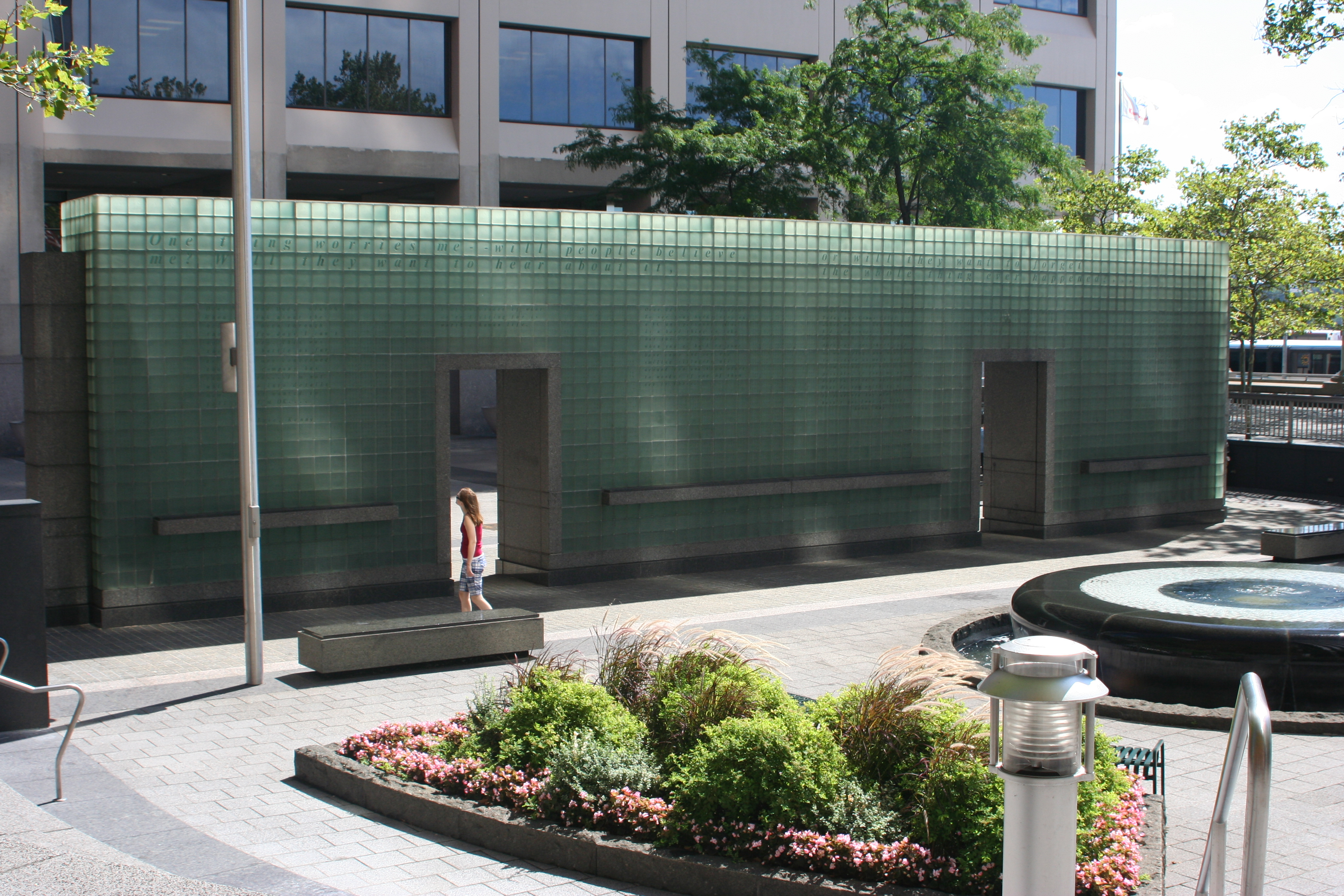
- For New York City veterans of the Vietnam War
- Established: May 4, 1985
- Location: 40.7025°N 74.009722°W; Financial District, Manhattan
- Designed by: Peter Wormser, William Fellows, and Joseph Ferrandino

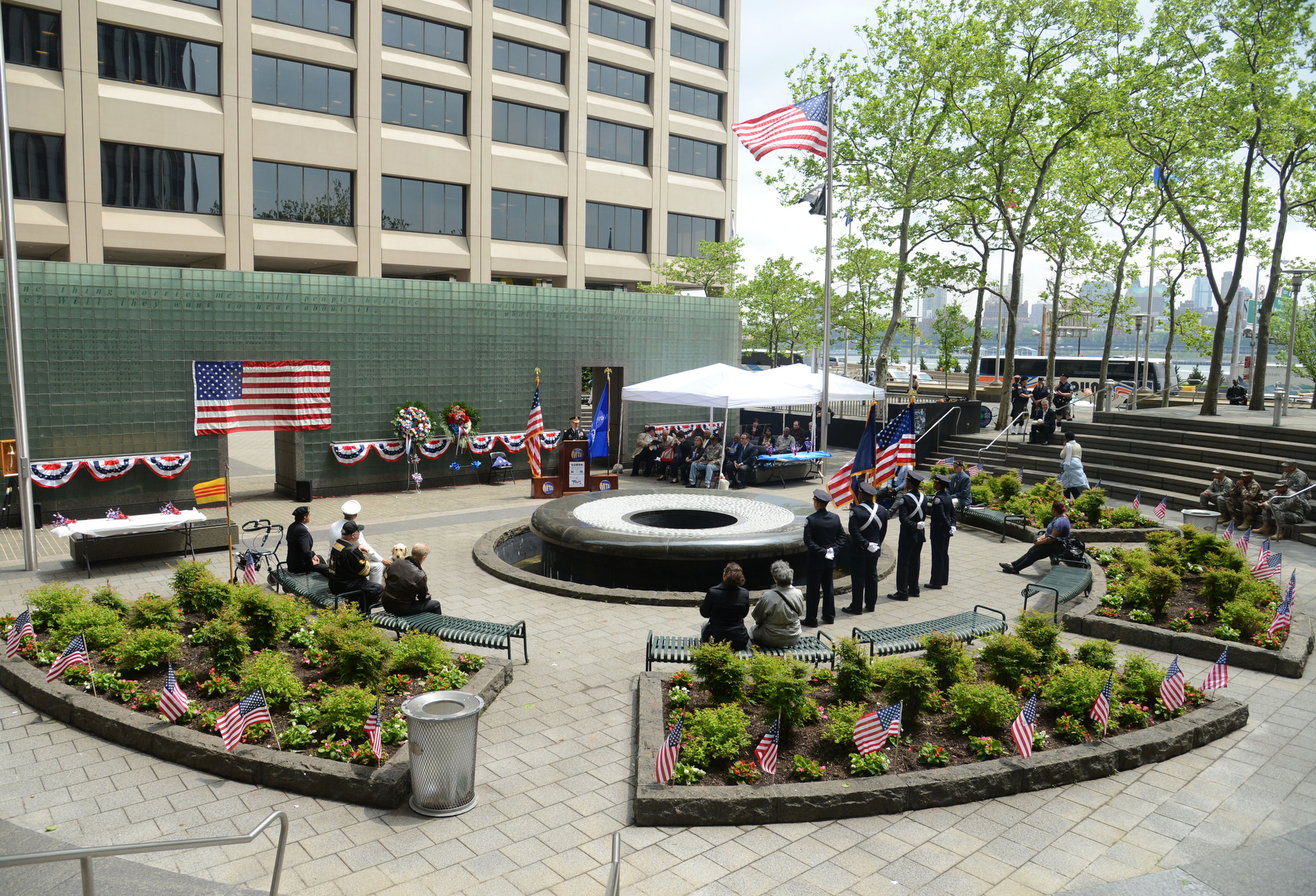
TVA Memorial Day Ceremony at Vietnam Memorial

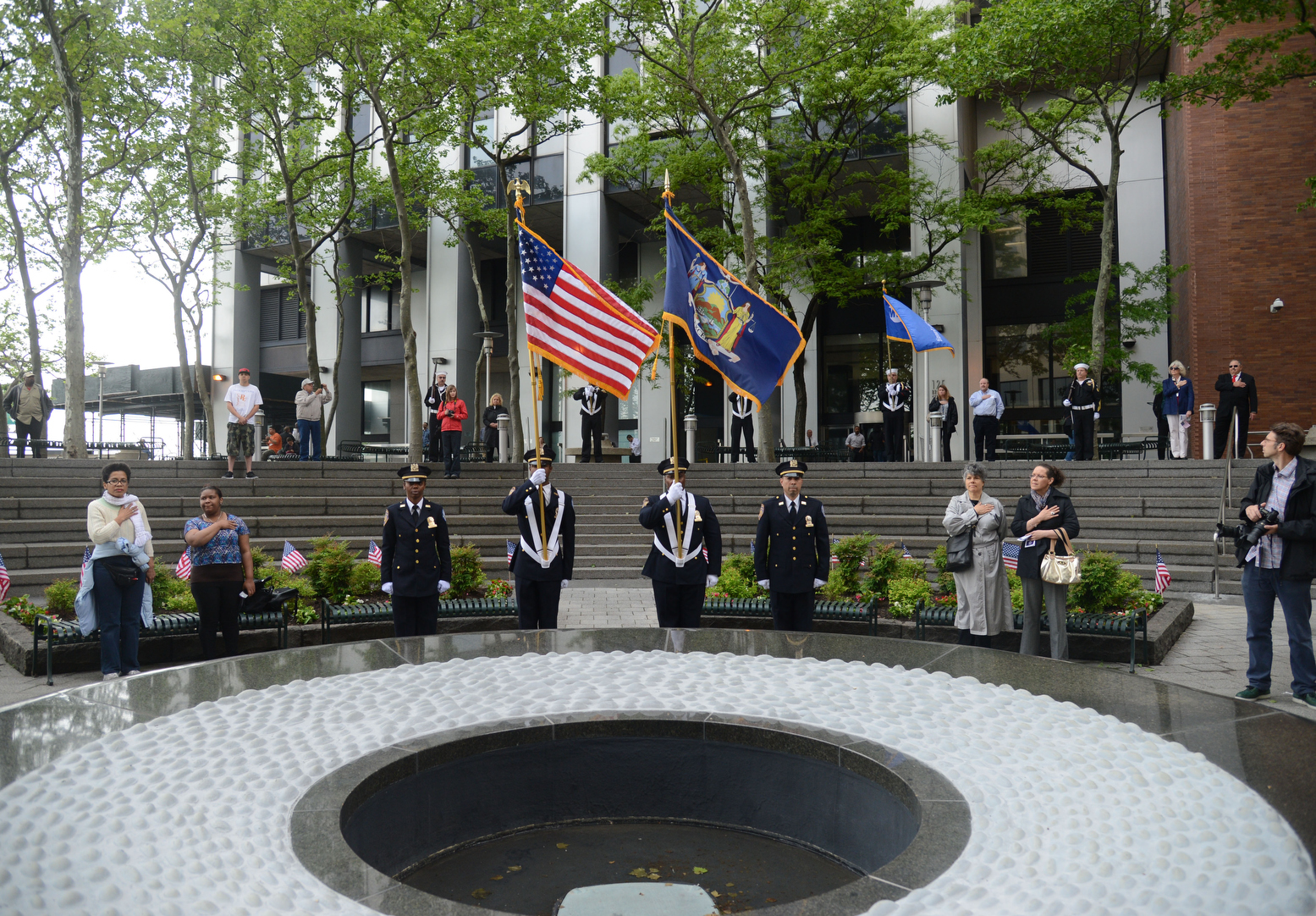
TVA Memorial Day Ceremony at Vietnam Memorial

Vietnam Veterans Plaza is an American memorial plaza in Manhattan, New York. It honors New York City citizens who served during the 20th-century Vietnam War.

== Description and history ==
Located in the Financial District in Lower Manhattan, it lies on a trapezoidal parcel of land that was formerly a roadway named Coenties Slip. The slip road was used from the 17th century by Dutch sailors between journeys. The slip was filled in 1835, and it then became Jeannette Park in 1884, dedicated to the ill-fated Jeannette of the Jeannette expedition. Horticulturist Samuel Parsons was responsible for laying out the garden in 1886.

By the mid-20th century, city planner Robert Moses had rebuilt the park with "horseshoe pitches and tennis, paddleball, handball, and shuffleboard courts all arranged around a tear-shaped asphalt plaza with a flagpole". As part of the construction of the neighboring 55 Water Street, Paul Friedberg was commissioned to redesign the land in 1971, to which he added the amphitheater fountain. Initially, 55 Water Street's owners were responsible for maintaining the park, which was paved in brick similar to the Elevated Acre plaza next to the building.

In 1982, plans were unveiled to redevelop Jeannette Park into a memorial for veterans of the Vietnam War. The architects Peter Wormser and William Fellows and the writer Joseph Ferrandino won a competition to design it. The New York Vietnam Veterans Memorial Commission raised private donations of $2.5 million ($1 million from Donald Trump, who served as co-chairman of the commission) to finance the memorial in 1983. The park was officially renamed Vietnam Veterans Plaza on July 20, 1983. The next year, it was announced that the plaza would contain a memorial wall, similar to that at the Vietnam Veterans Memorial but made of glass blocks. It was dedicated on May 6, 1985, by then-mayor Edward I. Koch to honor the 1,741 citizens of the city who died during the Vietnam War and the 250,000 men and women who served between 1964 and 1975.

Mayor Rudy Giuliani rededicated the plaza on November 9, 2001, following the September 11, 2001, attacks, as it underwent a $7 million restoration. A new ceremonial entrance was added providing access from Water Street to South Street and a black granite fountain placed at the center. The "Walk of Honor" contains 12 polished granite pylons with the names and ages at death of all 1,741 people who died.

In the future, the park may be the site of an entrance to a Second Avenue Subway station under Hanover Square.

== See also ==
- List of buildings, sites, and monuments in New York City
- New York Vietnam Veterans Memorial Commission
