= James Cash Penney =

American businessman (1875–1971)

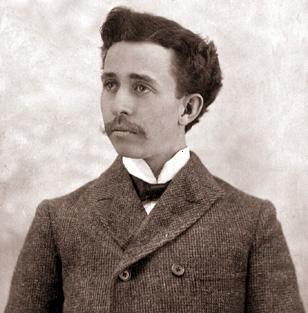
- Penney, c. 1902
- Born: James Cash Penney Jr. September 16, 1875; Hamilton, Missouri, U.S.
- Died: February 12, 1971 (aged 95); New York City, U.S.
- Resting place: Woodlawn Cemetery (The Bronx, New York City)
- Occupation: Businessman
- Years active: 1898–1971
- Known for: Establishing JCPenney department stores in 1902

James Cash Penney Jr. (September 16, 1875 – February 12, 1971) was an American businessman and entrepreneur who founded the JCPenney stores in 1902.

== Early life and education ==
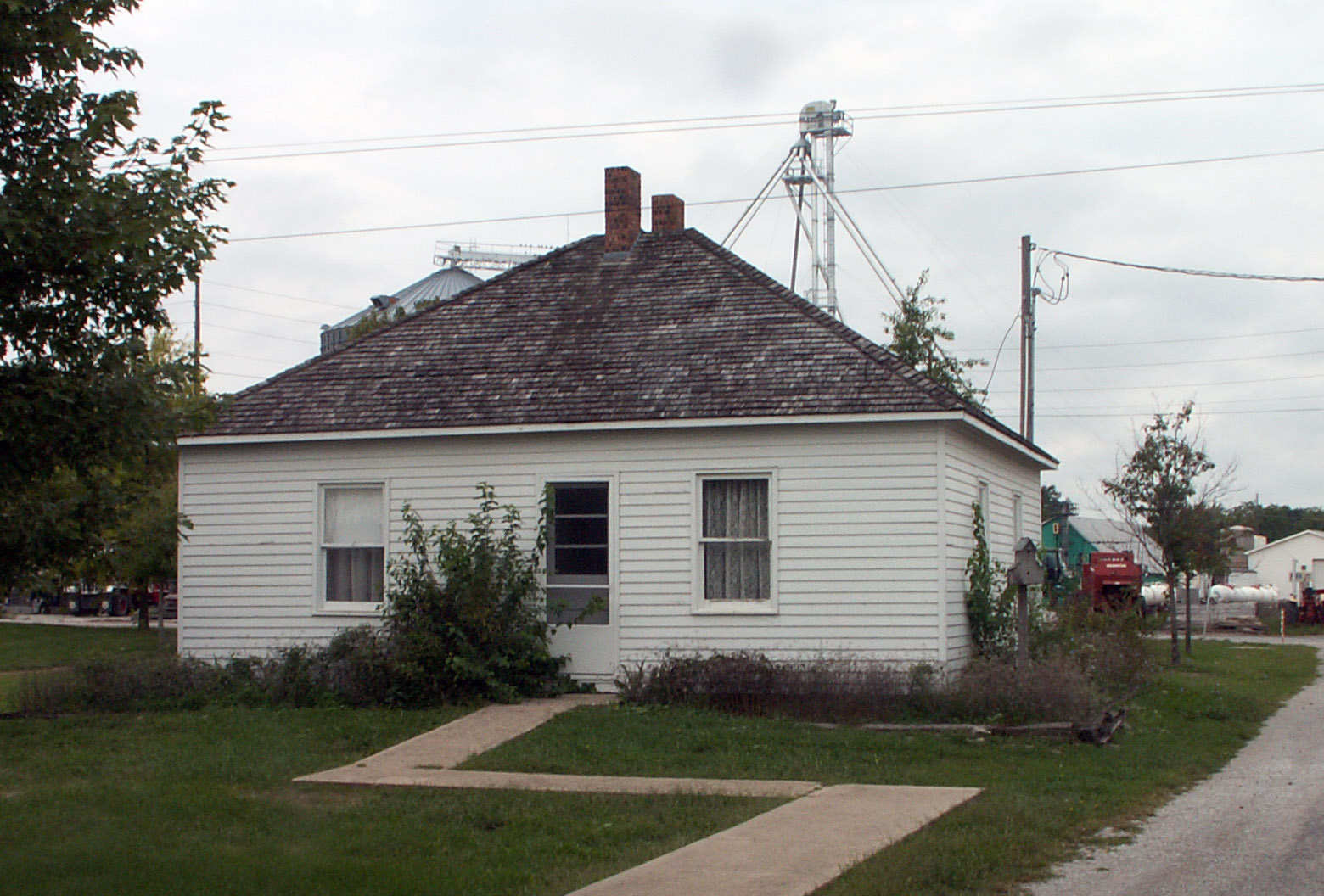
Penney's boyhood home in Hamilton, Missouri, which was moved from a farm to town for display

Penney was born on September 16, 1875, on a farm outside of Hamilton, Missouri, the seventh of twelve children, only six of whom lived to adulthood, born to James Cash Penney and Mary Frances (born Paxton) Penney. Penney's father was a Primitive Baptist preacher and farmer whose strict discipline included making his son pay for his own clothing once he reached eight years of age.

After graduation from Hamilton High School, Penney intended to attend college with hopes of becoming a lawyer. His father's untimely death, however, forced a change in plans, and Penney was forced to work as a store clerk to help support the family. Penney's tuberculosis caused him to venture west to Longmont, Colorado.

== J. C. Penney stores ==
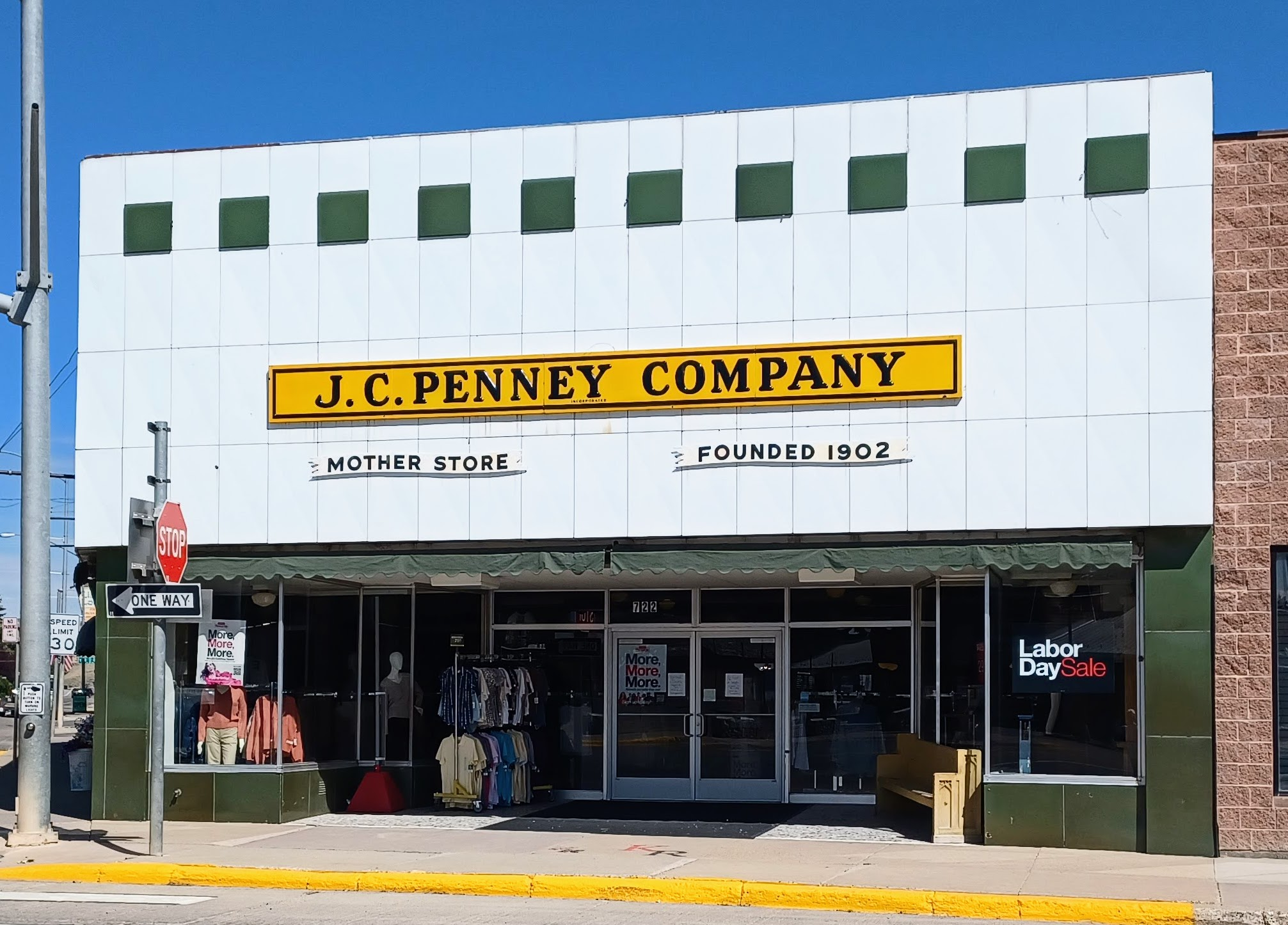
The JCPenney mother store in Kemmerer, Wyoming, with repurposed Golden Rule signage

In 1898, Penney began working for a small chain of stores in the Western United States, called the Golden Rule stores. In 1902, owners Guy Johnson and Thomas Callahan, impressed by his work ethic and salesmanship, offered him a one-third partnership in a new store he would open. Penney invested $2,000 and moved to Kemmerer, Wyoming, to open a store there. He participated in opening two more stores, and when Callahan and Johnson dissolved their partnership in 1907 he purchased full interest in all three stores.

By 1912, there were 34 stores in the Rocky Mountain States. In 1913, he moved the company to the Kearns Building in downtown Salt Lake City, Utah. The company was incorporated under the new name, J. C. Penney Company.

In 1916, he began to expand the chain east of the Mississippi River, and during the 1920s, the Penney company expanded nationwide, with 120 stores in 1920, most of which were still in the west. By 1924, Penney reported income of more than $1 million annually. The number of stores reached 1,400 by 1929.

The large income allowed him to be heavily involved in many philanthropic causes during the 1920s. By 1921, he had a home on Belle Isle in Miami Beach, Florida. Penney and partner Ralph W. Gwinn invested heavily in Florida real estate, including 120,000 acres (490 km^{2}) in Clay County. Some of this land became Penney Farms. This was also the start of Foremost Dairy Products Inc. Penney later recruited Paul E. Reinhold to run the dairy. Most of this work was halted with the Wall Street Crash of 1929 and the Great Depression left Penney in financial ruin.

After the crash, Penney lost virtually all his personal wealth and borrowed against his life insurance policies to help the company meet its payroll. The financial setbacks took a toll on his health, and he checked himself into the Battle Creek Sanitarium in Battle Creek, Michigan, for treatment.

After hearing the hymn "God Will Take Care of You", written by Civilla D. Martin, sung at a service in the hospital's chapel, he became a born again Christian.

Even after relinquishing daily operating management of the company, Penney continued his active involvement in managing the company and its stores. In 1940, during a visit to a store in Des Moines, Iowa, he trained a young Sam Walton on how to wrap packages with a minimal amount of paper and ribbon. He remained chairman of the board until 1946, and after that, as honorary chairman until his death in 1971. He never found a way to truly retire; he regularly visited his offices until his death. Penney directed his stores to be closed on Sunday so employees could attend church.

== Personal life ==
Penney was married three times. His first marriage, to Berta Alva Hess (1867–1910) in 1899, produced two sons before her death from pneumonia:

- Roswell Kemper Penney (1901–1971), who married Willa Graff.
- James Cash Penney III (1903–1938), who married Louise Ducoudray in 1927.

After Berta died in 1910, he married Mary Hortense Kimball (d. 1923) in July 1919. Mary gave birth to one son before her death due to a hemorrhage associated with an ectopic pregnancy:

- Kimball Penney (1920–1979)

In 1926, Penney married Caroline Marie Autenrieth (1895–1992). She was badly hurt in 1928 when she fell from a horse at their estate in White Plains, New York. They had two daughters:

- Mary Frances Penney (1927–2020), a professor of chemistry who obtained a PhD from the University of Oxford and a bachelor's degree from MIT, was married to Dr. Philip Franklin Wagley, son of Everitt F. Wagley, in 1953.
- Carol Marie Penney (1930–2002), who earned a degree in international relations from Stanford University, and was married to David Guyer, attaché of the United Nations Technical Mission at Delhi.

== Death ==
Penney lived in New York City at 888 Park Avenue, though he spent the winters in Palm Springs, California.

On December 26, 1970, Penney fell and fractured his hip. A few weeks later, he suffered a heart attack and never fully recovered. He died on February 12, 1971, in New York City.

Norman Vincent Peale delivered the eulogy at the funeral. Penney was buried in Woodlawn Cemetery in the Bronx, New York City, not far from the grave of fellow retail entrepreneur F. W. Woolworth. His estate was valued at approximately $35 million.

== Affiliations ==
=== Freemason ===
Penney was a Freemason most of his adult life, initiated into Wasatch Lodge No. 1 Free and Accepted Masons of Utah, on April 18, 1911. A member of both the Scottish and York Rites, Penney was coroneted a 33rd Degree on October 16, 1945, and received the Gold Distinguished Service Award by the General Grand Chapter, Royal Arch Masons, in Kansas City, Missouri, in 1958. He typically wore a large ring showing his Masonic degree.

=== Professional fraternities ===
Penney was a member of two professional collegiate fraternities: Alpha Gamma Rho for agriculture and Alpha Kappa Psi for business.

=== University of Miami ===
Penney was involved with the founding of the University of Miami, and served on its Board of Trustees from 1926 to 1930.

=== 40Plus ===
At the end of the Great Depression in 1939, Penney teamed with Thomas J. Watson, president and founder of IBM, Arthur Godfrey, the radio and TV personality; and Norman Vincent Peale, a minister, inspirational speaker, and author of The Power of Positive Thinking, to help Henry Simler, an executive with Remington Rand, form the first board of 40Plus, an organization that helps unemployed managers and executives.

=== Awards and philanthropy ===
In 1953, the Springfield, Missouri Chamber of Commerce presented Penney with a "Ozark Hillbilly Medallion" and a certificate proclaiming him a "hillbilly of the Ozarks."

Penney founded the James C. Penney Foundation in 1954. The foundation was restructured in 1999, with half the proceeds going to the Penney Family Fund, which is not affiliated with J. C. Penney Co., Inc., or its corporate giving program. The Penney Family Fund supports national organizations and state-based ones in Georgia, North Carolina, Arizona, and New Mexico that work to advance racial and environmental justice.

In 1960, Penney teamed up with the University of Missouri to establish the Penney-Missouri Awards to recognize excellence in Women's Page journalism, hoping to improve the sections where his stores most often advertised.

== Commemoration ==
- The J. C. Penney Conference Center at the University of Missouri-St. Louis was dedicated in his honor on January 23, 1972. The building was made possible through financial donations by Mr. Penney and his company.
- Mr. Penney was inducted into the Junior Achievement U.S. Business Hall of Fame in 1976.
- In 1926, Penney founded a retirement community in Northeast Florida for retired ministers in honor of his father. Today that community is still in existence, bearing his name, and is located in the town that also bears his name, Penney Farms, Florida.
- The J. C. Penney Historic District in Kemmerer, Wyoming, was declared a National Historic Landmark in 1978.
- In 1994, Penney was inducted into the Hall of Famous Missourians, and a bronze bust depicting him is on permanent display in the rotunda of the Missouri State Capitol in Jefferson City.
- James Cash Penney was inducted into the 4-H Hall of Fame in 2002
- James Cash Penney Hall at the National 4-H Center
- Hamilton High School in Hamilton, Missouri, was renamed Penney High School.
