= The Power of Positive Thinking =

1952 self-help book by Norman Vincent Peale

The Power of Positive Thinking: A Practical Guide to Mastering the Problems of Everyday Living
- First edition cover
- Author: Norman Vincent Peale
- Language: English
- Subject: Self-help
- Publisher: Prentice Hall
- Publication date: 1952
- Publication place: United States
- Media type: Print
- OCLC: 1112097081
- Dewey Decimal: 248.4
- LC Class: BV4908.5

The Power of Positive Thinking: A Practical Guide to Mastering the Problems of Everyday Living is a 1952 self-help book by American minister Norman Vincent Peale. It provides anecdotal "case histories" of positive thinking using a biblical approach, and practical instructions which were designed to help the reader achieve a permanent and optimistic attitude. These techniques usually involved affirmations and visualizations. Peale claimed that such techniques would give the reader a higher satisfaction and quality of life. The book was negatively reviewed by scholars and health experts, but was popular among the general public and has sold well.

== Author ==
Norman Vincent Peale, born in 1898 in southwestern Ohio, graduated from Ohio Wesleyan University and later received his bachelor's and master's degrees in sacred theology from Boston University's School of Theology. Peale then attended Syracuse University where he received a Doctor of Divinity degree. After serving 10 years as a Methodist clergyman in New York, Peale became the pastor of New York City's Marble Collegiate Church where he stayed for 53 years, until his retirement in 1984. Throughout his career as a pastor, Peale wrote over 40 books, became a sought-after motivational speaker, started weekly radio and television shows, organized the American Foundation of Religion and Psychiatry, and co-founded the spiritual newsletter Guideposts with his wife, Ruth Stafford Peale.

== Publication ==
The Power of Positive Thinking was published in October 1952 and continues to be Peale's most widely read work. It was on the New York Times Best Seller list for 186 weeks, 48 of which were spent in the No. 1 non-fiction spot. The book sold more than 5 million copies worldwide — 2.5 million from 1952 to 1956 — and was eventually translated into over 40 languages. Other books published by Peale around 1952 include The Art of Real Happiness, published in 1950, and Inspiring Messages for Daily Living, published in 1955. The Power of Positive Thinking appeared at a time when Christian church attendance was drastically increasing, national views of spirituality, individuality, and religion were shifting, and the Cold War was a growing concern for many Americans. These factors, as well as Peale's growing popularity as a motivational public figure and the book's clear prose, propelled The Power of Positive Thinking into a self-help book still popular today.

== Synopsis ==
Peale begins by stating ten rules for “overcoming inadequacy attitudes and learning to practice faith”. The rules include the following:

1. Picture yourself succeeding.
2. Think a positive thought to drown out a negative thought.
3. Minimize obstacles.
4. Do not attempt to copy others.
5. Repeat “If God be for us, who can be against us?” ten times every day.
6. Work with a counselor.
7. Repeat “I can do all things through Christ which strengtheneth me” ten times every day.
8. Develop a strong self-respect.
9. Affirm that you are in God's hands.
10. Believe that you receive power from God.

The next chapter describes the importance of creating a peaceful mind, which can be done through inspirational reading, clearing one's mind, or visualization. Peale continues with how to obtain consistent energy, saying that “God is the source of all energy”. The mind controls how the body feels; thus, letting go of negative energy and emotions will give infinite energy through God. Next, Peale speaks of the healing power of prayer, and how it will heal physical and emotional problems that arise from negative circumstances. In chapters five and six, Peale asserts that happiness is created by choice and that worrying only inhibits it and should be stopped. The next step in thinking positively is to always believe in success and not to believe in defeat because most obstacles are “mental in character”. Habitual worrying is the next obstacle to overcome through emptying the mind and positive affirmations. Peale then states that asking God for help can solve one's personal problems and physically and emotionally heal them.

In chapter twelve, Peale states that letting go of anger and embracing a sense of calm can help with physical illnesses, such as eczema. Next, Peale states that letting positive thoughts in can change one's outlook on life drastically and that practicing relaxation through God's help will lead to a content life. Chapter fifteen gives concrete examples on how to get others to like you, including the following: remember names, praise others generously, become a people person, and resolve problems calmly as soon as they appear. Peale then continues with how to overcome heartache through prayer, meditation, social interactions, and keeping a daily routine. The final chapter restates the importance of reaching out to a Higher Power for help in living a peaceful, positive life. Peale ends The Power of Positive Thinking with an epilogue encouraging readers to follow his techniques and live more fulfilled lives. Peale writes, “I pray for you. God will help you — so believe and live successfully.”

== Reception ==
=== Criticisms ===
Peale's work came under criticism from various mental health experts, theologians, and academics. One general criticism of Peale's book was the lack of verified sources. The Power of Positive Thinking includes many personal anecdotes that the reader has no way of validating. The book includes stories about “a business executive”, “a man, an alcoholic”, “a famous trapeze artist”, “a friend of [Peale’s], a midwestern businessman”, and other unnamed individuals which cannot be verified from the information Peale presents with each anecdote.

==== Similarity to hypnosis ====
Psychiatrist R. C. Murphy addresses another criticism of Peale's work in an article in The Nation dated May 7, 1955. He compares Peale's message in The Power of Positive Thinking to that of hypnosis, writing that "self-knowledge, in Mr. Peale's understanding, is unequivocally bad; self-hypnosis is good." Murphy explains that such repeated hypnosis defeats an individual's self-motivation, sense of reality, and ability to think critically. He describes Peale's understanding of the mind as inaccurate and his description of the workings of the mind as deceptively simplistic and false. Murphy states that if man's unconscious “can be conceptualized merely as a container for a small number of psychic fragments, then ideas like 'mind-drainage' follow. So does the reliance on self-hypnosis, which is the cornerstone of Mr. Peale's philosophy.” Murphy concludes that Peale's techniques for positive thinking relate too closely to hypnosis and are inadequate for the readers’ needs for self-improvement.

Albert Ellis, an influential psychologist of the 20th century and the founder of cognitive therapy, also criticized Peale's techniques for their similarities with hypnotism. He compared the techniques presented with those of the hypnotist Émile Coué and asserted that the repeated use of these hypnotic techniques could lead to significant mental health problems. Ellis stated that eventually Peale's teachings “lead to failure and disillusionment, and not only boomerang back against people, but often prejudice them against effective therapy."

==== Effectiveness of techniques ====
Another criticism is that Peale's philosophy is not accomplished through his techniques presented. R. C. Murphy writes that Peale's teachings “endorse the cruelties which men commit against each other” which encourages readers to “give up [their] strivings and feel free to hate as much as [they] like”. Murphy argues that by teaching others to destroy all negativity, Peale is, in fact, fostering negativity and aggression. Harvard scholar Donald Meyer presents a similar criticism in his article "Confidence Man" written in 1955. Meyer writes that The Power of Positive Thinking provides partial awareness to the limitations of the readers, but does not supply the necessary self-confidence to overcome those limitations. He proceeds to compare Peale to a con man saying that the problem with Peale lies in the “paltriness of the confidence he preached. He did not really try to fool you into thinking you could do much, or be much, or live much. He did not make you aware of greater heights any more than of greater abysses.”

Psychologist Martin Seligman, former APA president and founder of positive psychology, also condemned Peale's methods in his book, Authentic Happiness. He writes that, “positive thinking often involves trying to believe upbeat statements such as 'Every day, in every way, I’m getting better and better,' in the absence of evidence, or even in the face of contrary evidence.” Seligman continues his critique saying, “if you can manage the feat of actually believing these sorts of statements, more power to you. Many educated people, trained in skeptical thinking, cannot manage this kind of boosterism.”

Similarly, Donald Meyer, in his book The Positive Thinkers, critiques the effectiveness of Peale's techniques saying that Peale always “reacted to the image of harshness with flight rather than competitive fight.” Meyer later quotes Peale as saying, “No man, however resourceful or pugnacious, is a match for so great an adversary as a hostile world. He is at best a puny and impotent creature quite at the mercy of the cosmic and social forces in the midst of which he dwells." Meyer argues that positive thinking is disempowering to the individual; for, Peale presents individuals as weak compared to the “hostile world” with only the help of his techniques to overcome negative circumstances. In addition, Meyer also questions the effectiveness of Peale's positive thinking techniques in the antagonistic environment Peale presents.

==== Theological critique ====
Episcopal theologian John M. Krumm criticized Peale's teachings for their basis in religion, defining his teachings as heretical. Krumm writes that "the emphasis upon techniques such as the repetition of confident phrases” or “the manipulation of certain mechanical devices” gives “the impression of a thoroughly depersonalized religion. Very little is said about the sovereign mind and purpose of God; much is made of the things men can say to themselves and can do to bring about their ambitions and purposes." Krumm argues that Peale does not have the backing of religion to support his techniques. Krumm continues with a warning: "The predominant use of impersonal symbols for God is a serious and dangerous invitation to regard man as the center of reality and the Divine Reality as an impersonal power, the use and purpose of which is determined by the man who takes hold of it and employs it as he thinks best.”

Edmund Fuller, book review editor of the Episcopal Churchnews, warned against following Peale's teachings in an article titled “Pitchmen in the Pulpit” from March 1957. Fuller cautions readers not to believe Peale just because he was a minister. He writes that Peale's books have no connection to Christianity and that they “influence, mislead and often disillusion sick, maladjusted, unhappy or ill-constructed people, obscuring for them the Christian realities. They offer easy comforts, easy solutions to problems and mysteries that sometimes perhaps, have no comforts or solutions at all, in glib, worldly terms. They offer a cheap 'happiness' in lieu of the joy Christianity can offer.”

=== Positive reviews ===
While contemporary theologians and mental health experts criticized Peale's teachings in The Power of Positive Thinking, others praised the self-help book. The Los Angeles Times estimates that "legions of followers testified that Peale's message changed their lives for the better and represented the best combination of faith and pragmatism". This is evidenced by the popularity of Peale's book, which has sold more than five million copies worldwide and has been translated into over 40 languages. In addition, Peale was close friends with American presidents Eisenhower and Nixon, both of whom highly regarded his positive thinking teachings. Countless others accredited The Power of Positive Thinking for their success in overcoming obstacles including baseball player George Foster; Robert Schuller, founder and pastor of the Crystal Cathedral in Garden Grove, California; and Billy Graham, a prominent Southern Baptist minister. The Sunday Times described it as the great precursor of all self-help literature and in 2009 listed it among the 12 most influential books since World War II.

== Popular culture ==
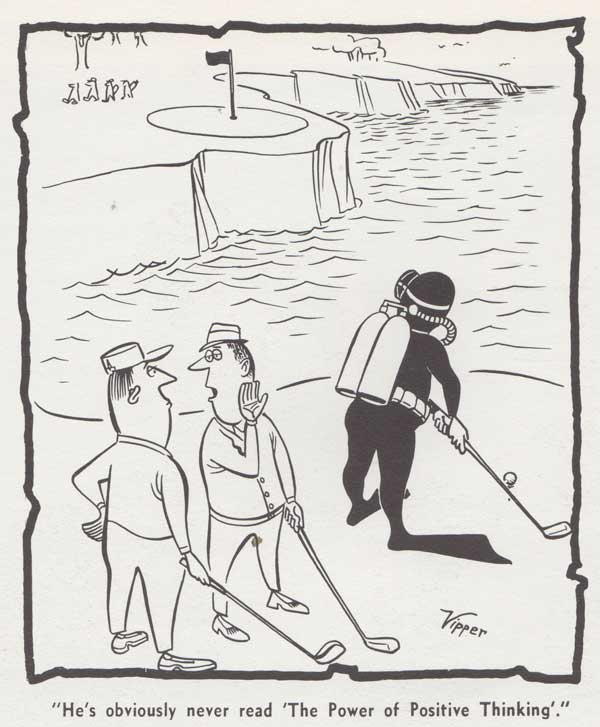
1964 cartoon by Virgil Partch referencing The Power of Positive Thinking

U.S. president Donald Trump has called Peale "his pastor" and "one of the greatest speakers" he had ever seen. According to Donald's niece and author Mary L. Trump, Donald Trump's father, Fred, became interested in Peale's message in the 1950s. Fred and his wife, Mary Anne MacLeod Trump, traveled to the Marble Collegiate Church in Manhattan with their children to hear Peale's sermons. Donald Trump grew up hearing Peale's teachings from his parents, and Peale officiated his first wedding. Trump credits his survival in 1990 after being almost a billion dollars in debt to Peale's positive thinking teachings.

The book is referenced in the 2020 DC Comics film Wonder Woman 1984, the villain of which is a self-help-touting entrepreneur.

Texan Helen Hadsell read the book in 1959 and credited the book with much of her success in winning contests. After reading the book she began entering and winning contests. She has stated from that point on she won every contest she ever entered.

== See also ==
- Autosuggestion
- Emmanuel Movement
- New Thought
- Positive mental attitude
