= 40Plus =

US-based private employment agency

40Plus, also known as 40 Plus, 40+, Forty Plus or FortyPlus, is a United States-based non-profit organization that helps professionals, managers and executives make career transitions and find employment. Historically, membership was limited to persons over 40, but some chapters have opened their ranks to experienced professionals of all ages. 40Plus chapters provide job search training programs, networking opportunities, and other resources to members. Members come from all sectors of the economy, including private businesses, non-profit organizations, educational institutions and government. Many people with technical and professional expertise do not receive outplacement counseling when they lose their jobs, and 40Plus chapters have helped to fill that gap for many individuals.

40Plus is a national organization, but each chapter is an independent, member-run, all-volunteer, non-profit 501(c)(3) organization. The Washington, D.C., chapter alone claims to have been instrumental in getting jobs for over 8,000 of their members over the last fifty years.

The mission of 40Plus "is to facilitate and support career transitions for people with substantial business or professional experience through training and volunteer experience." A secondary mission is "for educating the public and the business community on the value of maturity, experience, knowledge and judgement in the work place."

== History ==
40Plus was established in 1939 by Henry Simler, an executive with the Remington Rand company. He created a "40 Plus Committee" at New York City's Sales Executive Club to help the many over-forty executives he knew who were having difficulties finding jobs. Serving as a job clearinghouse and mutual support group, the club soon became an independent organization, while the concept spread to cities throughout the U.S. The first chapter was organized in Boston, and the second in New York City. In the 1940s and 1950s, chapters were formed in more than 20 cities around the United States, as well as in Canada, Britain, France and southern Africa. Many of those chapters later went out of existence.

Over the years, 40Plus chapters have garnered much media attention, in part because they had the unusual mission of losing their members by helping them find full-time professional or executive jobs.

In its early decades, 40Plus chapters tended to have only male members, but as more women entered the professional workforce, that practice changed.

In 2008, chapters of 40Plus were active in Washington, D.C., New York City, and Columbus, Ohio.

A book was published discussing middle aged career hunting techniques and advice much of which was obtained from Forty Plus of New York by E. Patricia Birsner], titled The 40+ Job Hunting Guide: The Official Handbook of the 40+Club.

The organization is recommended by Richard Nelson Bolles in his book, What Color Is Your Parachute.

Robert K. Otterbourg, in his book Kiplinger's Retire & Thrive, Fourth Edition: How More Than 50 People Redefined Their Retirement Lifestyles (Kiplinger's Personal Finance), refers to the Forty Plus organization as a valuable resource.

The National Council of Negro Women recommends 40Plus in their book, Tomorrow Begins Today: African American Women As We Age.

Jan Cannon's book for women looking to start up a new career Now What Do I Do?: The Woman's Guide to a New Career (Capital Ideas for Business & Personal Development) suggests 40Plus.

The New York organization's first Advisory Board included well-known business and societal leaders of the period, including Thomas J. Watson, president and founder of IBM; James Cash Penney, founder of J.C. Penney & Co.; Arthur Godfrey, the radio and TV personality; and Norman Vincent Peale, a minister, inspirational speaker, and author of "The Power of Positive Thinking."

Mayor Michael B. Coleman of Columbus, Ohio, recognized Forty Plus for supporting over 2000 experienced professionals in successful job search, career change or career advancement on the occasion of the Columbus chapter's 20th anniversary.

== Activities ==
- Weekly Meeting and Speakers
- Training courses
- Job Clubs
- Volunteering
- Networking Events and Resources
