= New York Vietnam Veterans Memorial Commission =

New York City government commission

Commission overview
- Formed: September 2, 1982
- Preceding Commission: Mayor’s Committee for a Vietnam Veterans Memorial Task Force
- Dissolved: 1992
- Superseding Commission: Friends of the Vietnam Veterans Plaza (de facto)
- Jurisdiction: New York City
- Headquarters: 4121-250 Broadway, New York City, New York
- Chairmen responsible: Scott Higgins, Co-Chairman; Donald Trump, Co-Chairman
- Commission executive: James Hebron, Executive Director
- Parent agency: Office of the Mayor

The New York Vietnam Veterans Memorial Commission, also known as the Citizens Committee for the Vietnam Veterans Memorial, was a committee established by New York City mayor Ed Koch in 1982 to finance the construction of the Vietnam Veterans Plaza and provide employment and mental health programs for veterans of the Vietnam War from New York City. The organization would inaugurate the Vietnam Veterans Plaza in 1985 and continue publicly supporting veterans of the Vietnam War until 1992, though its last publicized activities were in 1988. Its work would be succeeded by the Friends of the Vietnam Veterans Plaza in 1999.

== History ==
The commission was established September 2, 1982 on the recommendation of the preceding Mayor's Committee for a Vietnam Veterans Memorial Task Force to establish a “permanent organization” that would manage the fundraising campaign and design competition for the Vietnam Veterans Memorial, while developing the provision of support services for veterans of the Vietnam War from New York City.

On September 17, the commission selected Jeanette Park to host the planned Vietnam Veterans Memorial. The initial goal was to solicit one million dollars in private contributions. Half of these contributions would prospectively be used to finance the construction of the memorial, while the remainder would be used to provide employment and counselling services for veterans in New York who served between 1964 and 1975.

The commission hosted the Red, White, and Blue Gala luncheon at the Hyatt Grand Central New York on March 8, 1984, to fundraise for the memorial, which only 25 people attended. At the time, the commission raised $800,000 of the planned $1 to 1.4 million intended, with Koch making personal appeals to potential financiers for additional funding at the event.

During an executive committee meeting of the commission on April 8, Donald Trump, who was appointed co-chairman on November 5, 1982, provided a personal list of potential financiers who could contribute to the body's work. He also proposed raising individual prices for the 800 tickets for the next Red, White, and Blue Gala from $500 to $1,000 later that month, as he claimed to have invited then-U.S. president Ronald Reagan and First Lady Nancy Reagan to attend. He claimed this would put the commission closer to its fundraising goals. Both Reagans would decline to participate in the event, citing scheduling conflicts.

On February 27, 1985, Trump pledged to contribute $1 million to the commission if they could match it by May 7 of that year. Former Brigadier General Peter Dawkins, then an executive at Shearson Lehman Brothers, Inc., oversaw the commission's fundraising campaign, which entailed raising an average of $15,000 daily. The commission also fundraised through proceeds from the play “Tracers” hosted by the Royal Shakespeare Company, which would be used to fund their Jobs Program for Veterans.

The commission would officially dedicate the Vietnam Veterans Memorial on May 5 and host ceremonial events until May 7, which was the tenth anniversary of the end of the Vietnam War. The commission's de facto successor, the Friends of the Vietnam Veterans Plaza, claimed they raised over $3 million, while NYC Parks claimed they raised $2.5 million.

The commission's work would continue to be publicized until 1988. In late May 1985, the commission granted $500,000 to the New York Veterans Leadership Program, which aimed to provide veterans of the Vietnam War with job training. In July 1988, companies Corsair and HBO would agree to donate the profits from their distribution of the televised documentary adaptation of Dear America: Letters Home From Vietnam. On September 16, the profits from the theatrical showing of the adaption would also be donated to the commission.

The commission disbanded under New York mayor David Dinkins in 1992.

== Organization ==
Consisting of 100 members, the commission was co-chaired by Scott Higgins and Donald Trump, who presided over an executive committee of nine members handling administration. Beneath them was the Memorial and Program committees whose own chairs were part of the executive committee.

=== Executive Committee ===
The executive committee was led by James Hebron as the commission's executive director, being responsible for administration, advertising, and fundraising for the Vietnam Veterans Plaza and associated programs. Other than membership from the chairs of the Program and Memorial committees, Marina Kellen-Gundlash and Robert A. Ptachik oversaw administration while Franklin J. Havelick and Stephen Mann oversaw financing. Stephen C. Mersereau served on the committee as the commission's treasurer.

=== Memorial Committee ===
The Memorial Committee was co-chaired by Stewart G. Long and Robert D. Santos, consisting of 20 to 21 members. It was responsible for soliciting and selecting designs for the plaza, as well as overseeing its construction.

=== Program Committee ===
Co-chaired by James F. Norman and Robert R. Patterson Jr., the committee consisted of 20 to 21 members, responsible for soliciting of funds and selection of proposals for the Programatic Memorial. This was employment aid for veterans of the Vietnam War, meant to be financed through private contributions due to limited federal funding being cut for the Veterans Upgrade Centre of New York on January 30, 1982.

== See also ==
- Homeless veterans in the United States
- Vietnam Veterans Memorial Fund
- Vietnam Veterans Plaza
