= Norman Vincent Peale =

American minister, author, and positive thinking proponent (1898-1993)

Reverend Norman Vincent Peale
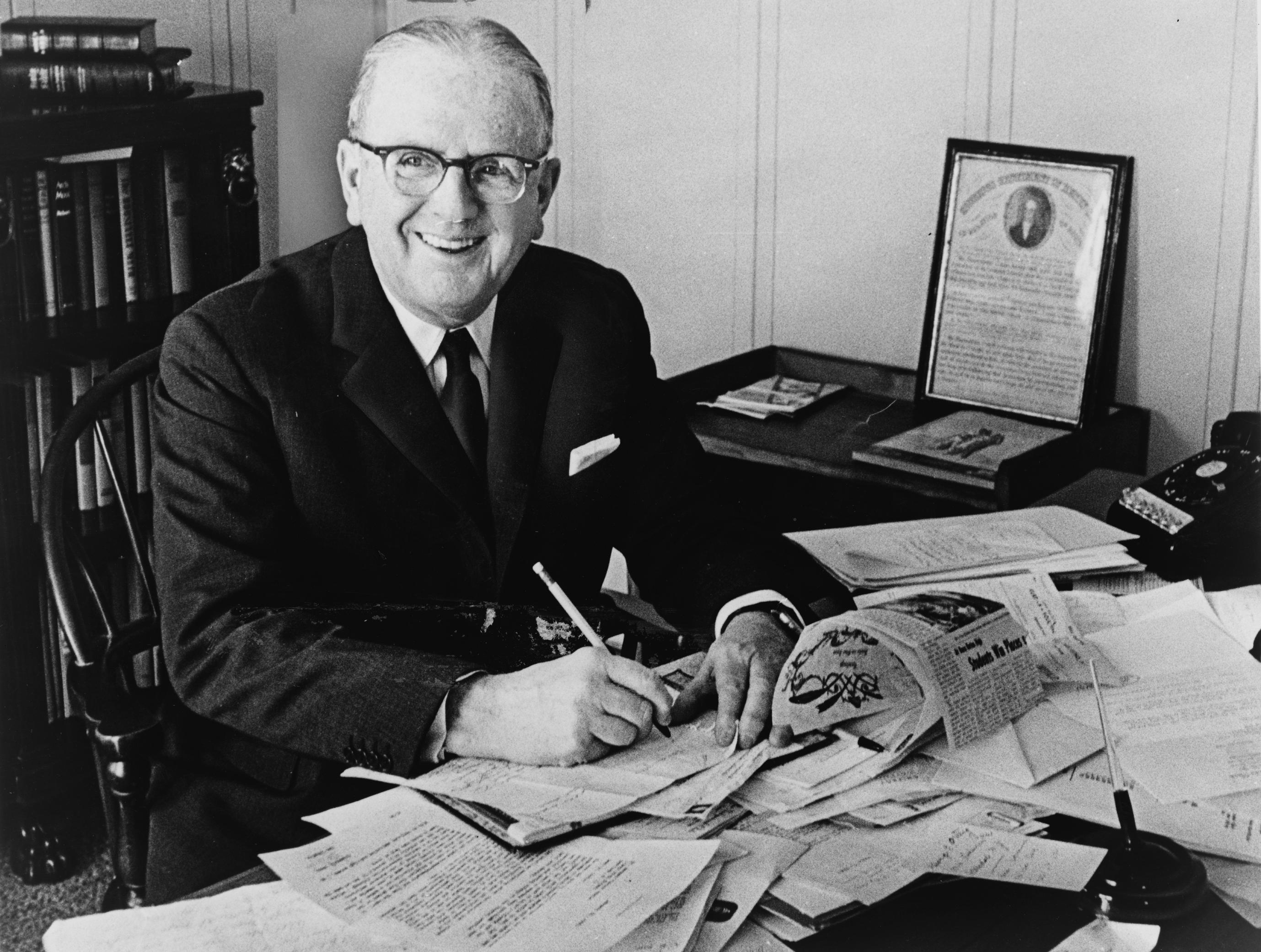
- Born: May 31, 1898; Bowersville, Ohio, U.S.
- Died: December 24, 1993 (aged 95); Pawling, New York, U.S.
- Education: Ohio Wesleyan University (BA); Boston University School of Theology (STB, MA)
- Organizations: Guideposts; Horatio Alger Association of Distinguished Americans
- Political party: Republican
- Movement: Christian libertarianism (Pealeism); Fourth Great Awakening
- Spouse: Ruth Stafford

Ecclesiastical career
- Religion: Methodism (1922-1932); Reformed Christianity (1932-1993)
- Church: Methodist Episcopal Church (1922-1932); Reformed Church of America (1932-1993)
- Ordained: 1922
- Congregations: University United Methodist Church (1922-1932); Marble Collegiate Church (1932-1993)
- Writing career
- Genres: Christian non-fiction; self-help
- Subjects: Mental health; personal development; self-discipline; personal relationships
- Notable work: The Power of Positive Thinking
- Movement: New Thought
- Military career
- Branch: Reserve Officer Training Corps
- Service years: 1917-1918
- Conflicts: World War I (Note: Peale enlisted in the Reserve Officer Training Corps to serve upon American entry into World War I in 1917. However, although uniformed and expected to be combat ready, he was discharged with the signing of the Treaty of Versailles.)

Norman Vincent Peale (May 31, 1898 – December 24, 1993) was an American Protestant clergyman, and an author best known for popularizing the concept of positive thinking, especially through his best-selling book The Power of Positive Thinking (1952). He served as the pastor of Marble Collegiate Church, New York, from 1932, leading this Reformed Church in America congregation for more than a half century until his retirement in 1984. Alongside his pulpit ministry, he had an extensive career of writing and editing, and radio and television presentations. Despite arguing at times against involvement of clergy in politics, he nevertheless had some controversial affiliations with politically active organizations in the late 1930s, and engaged with national political candidates and their campaigns, having influence on some, including personal friendships with Presidents Richard Nixon and Donald Trump.

Peale led a group opposing the election of John F. Kennedy for president, saying, "Faced with the election of a Catholic, our culture is at stake." Theologian Reinhold Niebuhr responded that Peale was motivated by "blind prejudice". After intense public criticism, Peale retracted his statement. He also opposed Adlai Stevenson's candidacy for president because he was divorced, which led to Stevenson's famous quip "I find Saint Paul appealing and Saint Peale appalling."

Following the publication of Peale's 1952 best seller, his ideas became the focus of criticism from several psychiatric professionals, church theologians and leaders. Peale was awarded the Presidential Medal of Freedom, the highest civilian honor in the United States, on March 26, 1984, by President Ronald Reagan. He died at age 95, following a stroke, on December 24, 1993, in Pawling, New York. Ruth Stafford, his wife of 63 years, influenced his publication of The Power in 1952, and was the co-founder of Guideposts.

== Early life and education ==
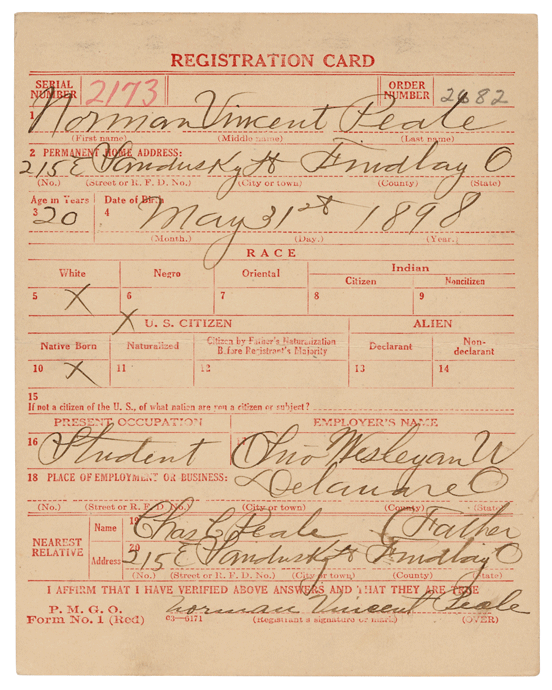
Peale's World War I draft card

Peale was born in Bowersville, Ohio on May 31, 1898, the eldest of three sons of Charles and Anna (née Delaney) Peale. Charles was a physician-turned-Methodist minister in southern Ohio, and as such, his three sons were raised as Methodists.

Peale graduated from Bellefontaine High School, Bellefontaine, Ohio in 1916. He attended and earned a bachelor's degree at Ohio Wesleyan University, where he became a brother at the Phi Gamma Delta fraternity. After graduating from Ohio Wesleyan, he worked as a newspaper reporter in Findlay, Ohio, and then in Detroit, Michigan. In 1921, he entered Boston University School of Theology to study for the Methodist ministry, and was ordained in 1922. He served for two years as pastor of a small church in Berkeley, Rhode Island. He graduated from Boston University in 1924, with a Master of Arts and an Bachelor of Sacred Theology.

== Career ==
=== Beginnings ===
After graduating from Boston University School of Theology, he moved to Brooklyn, New York, and became assistant pastor at St. Mark's Methodist Church. He then took control of a struggling congregation in Brooklyn; built a new church, and named it Kings Highway Church, where he served for three years, and increased its membership from just 40 people to around 900. In 1927, he received a call to Syracuse, New York, and took the pulpit at the University Methodist Church. It was also while there that he became one of the first American clergymen to bring his sermons to the emerging commercial technology of radio, a media decision that added to his general popularity, and that he would later extend in the same way to television.

In March 1932, he was asked to be a guest preacher at Marble Collegiate Church in New York City, which had been without a pastor for 2 years. The church leaders were so inspired with his manner of preaching, they offered him the pastor's position. In October 1932, he accepted their invitation, and became the full time minister, and because the church was affiliated with the Reformed Church in America, Peale transferred to that denomination. Peale began with an attendance at service of 200, but which would grow to thousands, as a result of his "spirited sermons". Peale remained at Marble until his retirement from pastoral work in 1984.

In the 1950s, when Peale started to become a notable public figure, his ideas and theology came under scrutiny, with criticism that he "embodied the worst elements in American religion". Theologian Reinhold Niebuhr, and William Lee Miller, a professor at the University of Virginia, spoke out publicly against his ideas and theology. Niebuhr said "This new cult is dangerous. Anything which corrupts the Gospel hurts Christianity. And it hurts people too." Miller wrote that Peale's theology is "hard on the truth and full of undocumented claims".

=== Early association with psychiatry ===
Following the 1929 market crash, and being presented with congregants with "complex problems", his wife counseled him to "fin[d] a psychiatrist who could help parish members", which he did through consultation with his physician, Clarence W. Lieb. In 1937, Peale founded a psychiatric clinic with the psychoanalyst Smiley Blanton, which became the American Foundation of Religion and Psychiatry; the two men also co-wrote two books together: Faith Is the Answer: A Psychiatrist and a Pastor Discuss Your Problems (1940), and The Art of Real Happiness (1950). Blanton handled psychiatric cases and Peale handled religious issues.

When Peale published his book, The Power of Positive Thinking in 1952, Blanton joined many members of the mental health community, and refused to endorse Peale's book. When Blanton wrote his own book in 1956, Love or Perish, he dedicated it to Peale. As author Donald Meyer describes it: "Peale evidently imagined that he marched with Blanton in their joint labors in the Religio-psychiatric Institute. This was not exactly so.":

=== Radio and publishing ===
Peale returned to the radio work that he began in Syracuse, as a means to deal with what he termed a personal obsession, "reach[ing] as many people as I could with the message of Jesus Christ". His first programs in New York City began in 1935, an effort which led to the National Council of Churches sponsoring a program on the NBC Radio Network entitled The Art of Living, which would grow to reach millions, and lasted for 54 years. From 1952 to 1968, Peale and his wife hosted a television show called What's Your Trouble?. In the meantime he continued to edit Guideposts magazine, and his sermons went out monthly to an extensive mailing list.

The Art of Living became the first of his books from New York City, in 1937, from Abingdon Press, which spoke of a power that individuals had within themselves that they could "tap" through "applied Christianity". With the advent of war in 1939, his second book appeared from Abingdon, "You Can Win, which spoke of the tensions of life, the possibility of self-mastery, and ones being one unconquerable with God. Despite a clear and apparent philosophy and message, the books did not "advis[e] people how to apply [the ideas] to their lives", and they did not sell well. (Some of his other works include The Tough-Minded Optimist (1961)) By the end of World War II in 1945, Peale, his wife Ruth, and Raymond Thornburg (a businessman from Pawling, New York), had founded Guideposts magazine, a non-denominational forum that presented inspirational stories.

With the end of the war – which was marked, in the words of George Vecsey, writing in The New York Times, by Americans having "some leeway to question what they believed and how they should live" – Peale achieved his first best seller, published with Prentice-Hall in 1948, a self-help book entitled A Guide for Confident Living that brought religion to bear on personal problems. This was followed soon thereafter by the book for which he is most widely known published in 1952, The Power of Positive Thinking; as Vecsey describes it, it arose from a draft book that Ruth Peale "sent to [an] editor without her husband's knowledge", and this usurpation led to it staying on the New York Times bestseller list for 186 consecutive weeks, "ranking it – behind the Bible – as one of the highest-selling spiritual books in history". According to Peale, it sold two million copies, while the publisher, Simon and Schuster, stated the book has sold around 5 million copies in 14 languages. In Ruth Peale's obituary, it was reported to have sold "more than 21 million copies in 42 languages". He was the author of 46 books, the last being Bible Power for Successful Living, published in 1993.

=== Organizations ===
During the Depression, Peale teamed up with J.C. Penney & Co. founder James Cash Penney, radio personality Arthur Godfrey, and IBM founder and President Thomas J. Watson, forming (and sitting the first board of) 40Plus, an organization aimed at helping unemployed managers and executives.

In 1947 Peale and educator Kenneth Beebe co-founded The Horatio Alger Association, an organisation that aimed to recognize and honor Americans successful in spite of difficult circumstances. Other organizations Peale founded include the Peale Center, the Positive Thinking Foundation, and Guideposts Publications.

== Personal life ==
On June 20, 1930, Peale married Iowan teacher Loretta Ruth Stafford. The wedding was officiated by his father, and held in Syracuse. Notable attendees included: Bishop Adna Wright Leonard and Chancellor Charles Wesley Flint. Ruth influenced his publication of The Power in 1952, as well as his early interactions with psychiatry. She co-founded Guideposts (of which she was chairman emeritus, and which had an annual readership of 8 million in 2008). She died on February 6, 2008, at the age of 101.

Peale was a 33-degree Freemason of the Scottish Rite.

== Later life ==
President Ronald Reagan awarded Peale the Presidential Medal of Freedom (the highest civilian honor in the United States) on March 26, 1984, for originating a "philosophy of happiness" and for "helping millions find new meaning in their lives".

Peale died at age 95 following a stroke, on December 24, 1993, in Pawling, New York

== Critiques ==
=== General and psychological critique ===
Peale's works were criticized by several mental health experts who denounced his writings as bad for mental health, and concluded that Peale was a "con man and a fraud", and a "Confidence Man". These critics appeared in the early 1950s after the publication of The Power of Positive Thinking.

In a 1955 article by psychiatrist R. C. Murphy, published in The Nation, titled "Think Right: Reverend Peale's Panacea". Murphy argues that Peale's philosophy was based on exaggerating the fears of his readers and followers, and that this exaggerated fear inevitably leads to aggression and the destruction of those considered "negative". Donald B. Meyer also seemed to agree with Murphy's assessment, presenting similar warnings of a religious nature. In his article "Confidence Man", Meyer wrote, "In more classic literature, this sort of pretension to mastery has often been thought to indicate an alliance with a Lower rather than a Higher power." The mastery Peale speaks of is not the mastery of skills or tasks, but the mastery of fleeing and avoiding one's own "negative thoughts". Meyer wrote, exaggerated fear inevitably leads to aggression: "Battle it is; Peale, in sublime betrayal of the aggression within his philosophy of peace, talks of 'shooting' prayers at people."

In 1955, William Lee Miller, a professor at the University of Virginia, wrote an extensive article called "Some Negative Thinking About Norman Vincent Peale". After reviewing what Peale had written until that point, Miller concluded that the books "are hard on the truth", and that "the later books are worse" than the earlier ones. Miller further questioned Peale's claims that his methods of "religion" are scientifically proven, as Peale provides no scientific evidence in his books to support this claim. He provides no evidence that his methods and "techniques" have been scientifically tested or proven to work. Miller goes on to note that there are no scientific references supporting Peale, no footnotes, no index, no bibliography, and almost no evidence presented in the Peale books. Miller concluded that the Peale claims were untruthful and unsupported by evidence.

Psychologist Albert Ellis, founder of the branch of psychology known as cognitive psychology, documented in several of his books the many individuals he has treated who suffered mental breakdowns from following Peale's teachings. Ellis' writings warn the public not to follow the Peale message. Ellis contends the Peale approach is dangerous, distorted, unrealistic. He compares the black or white view of life that Peale teaches to a psychological disorder (borderline personality disorder), perhaps implying that dangerous mental habits which he sees in the disorder may be brought on by following the teaching. "In the long run [Peale's teachings] lead to failure and disillusionment, and not only boomerang back against people, but often prejudice them against effective therapy."

Psychologist Martin Seligman, former APA president and the founder of the branch of psychology known as Positive Psychology, differentiated Peale's positive thinking from his own positive psychology, while acknowledging their common roots.

Positive Psychology has a philosophical connection to positive thinking, but not an empirical one. The Arminian Heresy is at the foundations of Methodism, and Norman Vincent Peale's positive thinking grows out of it. Positive Psychology is also tied at its foundations to the individual freely choosing, and in this sense both endeavors have common roots. But Positive Psychology is also different in significant ways from positive thinking, in that Positive Psychology is based on scientific accuracy while positive thinking is not, and that positive thinking could even be fatal in the wrong circumstances.

Seligman went on to say "Positive thinking often involves trying to believe upbeat statements such as 'Every day, in every way, I am getting better and better,' in the absence of evidence or even in the face of contrary evidence. ... Learned optimism, in contrast, is about accuracy".

=== Theological critique ===
Episcopal Church theologian and future bishop John M. Krumm criticized Peale and the "heretical character" of his teaching on positive thinking. Krumm cites "the emphasis upon techniques such as the repetition of confident phrases... or the manipulation of certain mechanical devices", which he says "gives the impression of a thoroughly depersonalized religion. Very little is said about the sovereign mind and purpose of God; much is made of the things men can say to themselves and can do to bring about their ambitions and purposes". Krumm cautions that "The predominant use of impersonal symbols for God is a serious and dangerous invitation to regard man as the center of reality and the Divine Reality as an impersonal power, the use and purpose of which is determined by the man who takes hold of it and employs it as he thinks best."

Theologian Reinhold Niebuhr, professor of applied Christianity at the Union Theological Seminary, reported similar concerns about positive thinking. "This new cult is dangerous. Anything which corrupts the gospel hurts Christianity. And it hurts people too. It helps them to feel good while they are evading the real issues of life."

Liston Pope, Dean of Yale Divinity School, agreed with Niebuhr. "There is nothing humble or pious in the view this cult takes of God. God becomes sort of a master psychiatrist who will help you get out of your difficulties. The formulas and the constant reiteration of such themes as 'You and God can do anything' are very nearly blasphemous."

G. Bromley Oxnam, a Methodist bishop in Washington, D.C., also weighed in with his concerns. "When you are told that if you follow seven easy rules you will become president of your company, you are being kidded. There just aren't that many openings. This kind of preaching is making Christianity a cult of success."

William Lee Miller, professor in religious studies at the University of Virginia, expressed similar concerns: "The absolute power that Dr. Peale's followers insist on granting to their Positive Thinking may betray, however, a note of desperation. The optimism is no longer the healthy-minded kind, looking at life whole and seeing it good, but an optimism arranged by a very careful and very anxious selection of the particular bits and pieces of reality one is willing to acknowledge. It is not the response of an expanding epoch when failure, loneliness, death, war, taxes, and the limitations and fragmentariness of all human striving are naturally far from consciousness, but of an anxious time when they are all too present in consciousness and must be thrust aside with slogans and "formulas", assaulted with clenched fists and gritted teeth, and battered down with the insistence on the power of Positive Thinking. The success striving is different, too. The Horatio Alger type seems to have had a simple, clear confidence in getting ahead by mastering a craft, by inventing something out in the barn, or by doing an outstanding job as office boy. The Peale fan has no such confidence and trusts less in such solid realities as ability and work and talent than in the ritual repetition of spirit lifters and thought conditioners written on cards and on the determined refusal to think gloomy thoughts.

In spite of the attacks, Peale did not resign from his church, though he threatened that he would repeatedly. He also never challenged or rebutted his critics directly.

=== Political issues ===
==== Peale and the Committee for Constitutional Government ====
In 1942, Peale replaced Samuel B. Pettengill as the chairman of the National Committee to Uphold Constitutional Government (NCUCG). The NCUCG was a pressure group opposed to Franklin Roosevelt's policies. In 1945, Peale was succeeded by Willford I. King as chairman of the NCUCG.

In 1938, Peale appeared with Elizabeth Dilling, and Reverend Edward Lodge Curran at a "Mass Meeting and Pro-American Rally" at the Commodore Hotel in New York. Curran was widely known as an "anti‐communist" and a supporter of American isolationism. An article in The Daily Worker described the event as an "anti-Semitic rally", with New York representative John J. O'Connor and Fritz Kuhn, leader of the German American Bund, in attendance at the rally as well. The event was also described by John Roy Carlson in his 1943 book Under Cover: My Four Years in the Nazi Underworld of America as a "pro-American mass meeting sponsored by more than 50 patriotic organizations". Peale said that he was distressed by Carlson's book; that he had been badgered into giving the invocation by a parishioner, and that he had no idea of the nature of the rally. He considered but was advised against filing a defamation case against the publisher, Putnam's, as it was not feasible given the fact that he had in fact delivered the invocation as described.

In 1943, after the U.S. entry into World War II, Peale preached a sermon denouncing anti-semitism and urging that the government and church take steps to "stamp it out".

==== Peale and Adlai Stevenson ====
Peale is also remembered in politics because of the Adlai Stevenson quote: "I find Saint Paul appealing and Saint Peale appalling." The origin of the quote can be traced back to the 1952 election when Stevenson was informed by a reporter that Peale was accusing him of being unfit for the presidency because he was divorced. Later during his 1956 campaign for president against Dwight Eisenhower, Stevenson was introduced at a speech with: "Governor Stevenson, we want to make it clear you are here as a courtesy because Dr. Norman Vincent Peale has instructed us to vote for your opponent." Stevenson stepped to the podium and quipped, "Speaking as a Christian, I find the Apostle Paul appealing and the Apostle Peale appalling."

Stevenson continued to lampoon Peale on the campaign trail in speeches for Kennedy. Though Richard Nixon and other Republicans tried to distance themselves from the furor that was caused by Peale's anti-Catholic stance, Democrats did not let voters forget it. President Harry Truman, for one, accused Nixon of tacitly approving Peale's anti-Catholic sentiment, and it remained a contentious issue on the campaign trail. At a later date, according to one report, Stevenson and Peale met, and Stevenson apologized to Peale for any personal pain that his comments might have caused Peale, though Stevenson never publicly recanted the substance of his statements.

==== Peale and John F. Kennedy ====
Peale was invited to attend a strategy conference of about 30 Evangelicals in Montreux, Switzerland, by its host, the well-known evangelist Billy Graham, in mid-August 1960. There they agreed to kick off a group called The National Conference of Citizens for Religious Freedom in Washington the following month. On September 7, Peale served as its chairman and spoke for 150 Protestant clergymen, opposing the election of John F. Kennedy as president. "Faced with the election of a Catholic," Peale declared, "our culture is at stake."

In a written manifesto, Peale and his group also declared that Kennedy would serve the interests of the Catholic Church before he would serve the interests of the United States, writing "It is inconceivable that a Roman Catholic president would not be under extreme pressure by the hierarchy of his church to accede to its policies with respect to foreign interests"; they speculated that the election of a Catholic might even end free speech in America.

Protestant theologian Reinhold Niebuhr responded, "Dr. Peale and his associates ... show blind prejudice." Protestant Episcopal Bishop James Pike echoed Niebuhr: "Any argument which would rule out a Roman Catholic just because he is Roman Catholic is both bigotry and a violation of the constitutional guarantee of no religious test for public office." As conservative Catholic William F. Buckley described the fallout: "When ... the committee was organized, on the program that a vote for Kennedy was a vote to repeal the First Amendment to the Constitution, the Jesuits fired their Big Bertha, and Dr. Peale fled from the field, mortally wounded." Peale subsequently went into hiding and threatened to resign from his church. The fallout continued as Peale was condemned in a statement by one hundred religious leaders and dropped as a syndicated columnist by a dozen newspapers.

In his book "The Tough Minded Optimist" Peale dedicates a chapter to the incident which he cites as one of the most misunderstood and difficult periods of his life. He claimed he did not call the meeting or have any part in calling it, and had no part whatever in preparing the statement issued by the group.

== Influence ==
Five U.S. presidents, Richard Nixon, Gerald Ford, Jimmy Carter, Ronald Reagan, and George H. W. Bush spoke well of Peale in the documentary about his life, Positive Thinking: The Norman Vincent Peale Story. The documentary was Nixon's final television appearance.

Billy Graham said in 1966, "I don't know of anyone who had done more for the kingdom of God than Norman and Ruth Peale or have meant any more in my life for the encouragement they have given me."

Mary L. Trump in Too Much and Never Enough wrote that Donald Trump's father, Fred Trump, was "immediately drawn to Peale’s teachings". As a child, Donald Trump attended Marble Collegiate Church with his parents. Both he and his two sisters, Maryanne and Elizabeth, were married there. Trump has repeatedly praised Peale and cited him as a formative influence. Peale officiated Donald Trump's first wedding.

Scott Adams, creator of Dilbert, says Peale's writing influenced him to achieve success.

== Cultural references ==
- Peale was the subject of the 1964 feature film, One Man's Way, starring Don Murray.
- A widely reprinted editorial in the Los Angeles Times stated that the 2006 book and DVD The Secret both borrow on Peale's ideas, and that The Secret suffers from some of the same weaknesses as Peale's works.
- In the 1987 graphic novel Watchmen, Adrian Veidt is described as being "a little Norman Vincent Peale" after a vague explanation of how he achieved success in wealth and fitness.
- Peale was profiled in an episode (March 16, 2016) of the CNN series Race for the White House, entitled "John F. Kennedy vs. Richard Nixon".
- In Too Much and Never Enough, Mary L. Trump described Peale as a charlatan.

== Selected works ==
- The Positive Power of Jesus Christ (1980) ISBN 0-8423-4875-1
- Stay Alive All Your Life (1957)
- Why Some Positive Thinkers Get Powerful Results (1987). ISBN 0-449-21359-5
- The Power of Positive Thinking, Ballantine Books; Reissue edition (August 1, 1996). ISBN 0-449-91147-0
- Guide to Confident Living, Ballantine Books; Reissue edition (September 1, 1996). ISBN 0-449-91192-6
- Six Attitudes for Winners, Tyndale House Publishers; (May 1, 1990). ISBN 0-8423-5906-0
- Positive Thinking Every Day : An Inspiration for Each Day of the Year, Fireside Books; (December 6, 1993). ISBN 0-671-86891-8
- Positive Imaging, Ballantine Books; Reissue edition (September 1, 1996). ISBN 0-449-91164-0
- You Can If You Think You Can, Fireside Books; (August 26, 1987). ISBN 0-671-76591-4
- Thought Conditioners, Foundation for Christian; Reprint edition (December 1, 1989). ISBN 99910-38-92-2
- In God We Trust: A Positive Faith for Troubled Times, Thomas Nelson Inc; Reprint edition (November 1, 1995). ISBN 0-7852-7675-0
- Norman Vincent Peale's Treasury of Courage and Confidence, Doubleday; (June 1970). ISBN 0-385-07062-4
- My Favorite Hymns and the Stories Behind Them, HarperCollins; 1st ed edition (September 1, 1994). ISBN 0-06-066463-0
- The Power of Positive Thinking for Young People, Random House Children's Books (A Division of Random House Group); (December 31, 1955). ISBN 0-437-95110-3
- The Amazing Results of Positive Thinking, Fireside; Fireside edition (March 12, 2003). ISBN 0-7432-3483-9
- Stay Alive All Your Life, Fawcett Books; Reissue edition (August 1, 1996). ISBN 0-449-91204-3
- You Can Have God's Help with Daily Problems, FCL Copyright 1956–1980 LOC card #7957646
- Faith Is the Answer: A Psychiatrist and a Pastor Discuss Your Problems, Smiley Blanton and Norman Vincent Peale, Kessinger Publishing (March 28, 2007), ISBN 1-4325-7000-5 (10), ISBN 978-1-4325-7000-2 (13)
- Power of the Plus Factor, A Fawcett Crest Book, Published by Ballantine Books, 1987, ISBN 0-449-21600-4
- This Incredible Century, Peale Center for Christian Living, 1991, ISBN 0-8423-4615-5
- Sin, Sex and Self-Control, 1977, ISBN 0-449-23583-1, ISBN 978-0-449-23583-6, Fawcett (December 12, 1977)
