= Foremost Dairy Products =

American dairy company, 1929 to 1931

Foremost Dairy Products, Incorporated
- Type: Public
- Industry: Dairy
- Founded: February, 1929
- Founder: James Cash Penney
- Defunct: 1931
- Fate: Foreclosed
- Successor: Foremost Dairies, Inc.
- Headquarters: United States
- Area served: Southern United States
- Key people: Burdette G. Lewis; Ralph W. Gwinn

Foremost Dairy Products, Incorporated was a large dairy company in the southern United States.

J. C. Penney, founder of the department store bearing his name, was behind the creation of the Foremost Dairy Products Company. In one of his addresses he said: "There is a $300,000,000 undeveloped dairy potential in the south alone. The activities of the Foremost Dairy Products Organization will be devoted to the development of this potential source of income."

Penney, along with his partner Ralph W. Gwinn, invested heavily in Florida real estate in the 1920s, especially Clay County in northeast Florida around Jacksonville. They established Penney Farms (an experimental farming community), which provided the basis for the Foremost Dairy Products Company.

== History ==
In February 1929, about 25 dairies merged into a new organization to be named Foremost Dairy Products, Inc. This consolidation was announced by Dr. Burdette G. Lewis of the Penney-Gwinn Corporation, which was the primary party to the merger. Lewis to be President of the company and J. C. Penney, Chairman of the Board. Combined companies had physical assets exceeding $4,500,000 and annual sales of more than $6,000,000. They were located in Alabama, Florida, Georgia and South Carolina. Each joining dairy maintained control of their business locally, combining their assets to allow greater purchasing power for cattle, supplies and equipment.

Later that year, in November 1929, Foremost purchased Southwest Dairy Products in a deal involving $15,000,000. They now operated in Virginia, North Carolina, South Carolina, Georgia, Florida, Mississippi, Alabama, Louisiana, Texas, Arkansas, Oklahoma, and Missouri.

Foremost Dairy Products, Inc came to its end in 1931, a victim of the Great Depression. In the fall of that year, they were forced to sell all assets at foreclosure. Its company charter was revoked for failure to pay its capital stock tax.

The principal players in the company did not give up, however, and in September 1931 formed a new company, Foremost Dairies, Inc. Which bought much of the assets of the now defunct Foremost Dairy Products, Inc. They first sold a number of their processing plants, either to outside investors or back to their local owners, and subsequently purchased with the new company all remaining assets of the old one. This entailed a complicated multi-year endeavor to reorganize the company, with much buying and selling of assets, as described in a very detailed 1934 stock sale prospectus.

Foremost Dairies, Inc. expanded from serving 12 communities in 4 states (1932) to serving 112 communities in 22 states plus the Far East (1953). International operations were located in Hawaii, Guam, Okinawa and Japan. Annual sales were about $160,000,000 in 1953.

Dairies associated with the initial merger:

Florida:
- Penney Farms of the J. C. Penney-Gwinn Corporation (Clay County)
- Tampa Stock Farms Dairy (Tampa)
- J. R. Berrier Ice Cream Company (Jacksonville)
- Halifax Creamery, Inc. (Daytona Beach)
- W. C. Berrier Creamery, Inc. (Lakeland)
- S. M. Breedlove Company (Live Oak)
- Flowers Ice Cream Company (Tallahassee)

Georgia:
- S. M. Breedlove Company (Valdosta)
- Jessup Ice Cream Company (Atlanta)
- Antrim Ice Cream Company (Atlanta)
- Atlanta Ice Cream Company (Atlanta)
- Gate City Ice Cream Company (Atlanta)
- Joseph Costa Company (Athens)
- Georgia-Carolina Dairy Products Company (Augusta)
- Augusta Creamery (Augusta)
- Kinnet Odom Company (Macon)
- Columbus Dairy Company (Columbus)
- Americus Ice Cream Company (Americus)
- Tifton Ice Cream Company (Tifton)
- Flowers Ice Cream Company (Thomasville)
- S. B. Breedlove Ice Cream Company (Valdosta)
- Georgia Milk Company (Waycross)
- Crescent City Ice Cream Company (Gainesville)
- Purity Ice Cream Company (Rome)
- Ashburn Creamery (Ashburn)

South Carolina:
- Rogers Ice Cream Company (Columbia)
- Hub City Ice Cream Company (Spartanburg)

Alabama:
- Jersey Ice Cream Company (Birmingham)
- Kratzer Ice Cream Company (Montgomery)
