= Ruth Stafford Peale =

American writer (1906–2008)

- Born: Ruth Stafford; September 10, 1906; Fonda, Iowa, U.S.
- Died: February 6, 2008 (aged 101); Pawling, New York, U.S.
- Occupation(s): American writer, editor, and speaker
- Spouse: Norman Vincent Peale (m. 1930; died 1993)
- Website: ruthstaffordpeale.org

Ruth Stafford Peale (née Stafford; September 10, 1906 – February 6, 2008) was an American writer, editor, and speaker.

She was born in Fonda, Iowa, to Canadian parents Methodist clergyman Frank B. Stafford and Loretta A. Stafford. In 1913, the family moved to Detroit, where she attended high school and ultimately attended Wayne State University. Peale graduated from Syracuse University in 1928, where she studied math and philosophy. After this, she taught high school mathematics.

Although she originally vowed never to marry a minister after growing up as the daughter of a minister, eventually she married Norman Vincent Peale on June 20, 1930. Norman would later write The Power of Positive Thinking. The two met in Syracuse.

Along with her husband, Peale co-founded the Guideposts publishing organization in 1945. She has been recognized as the driving force behind the Guideposts inspirational magazine. Peale served as Guideposts' Chairman of the Board from 1992 to 2003. The two also formed the Peale Center for Christian Living.

Peale was the first woman to be president of the National Board of North American Missions of the Reformed Church in America. She also founded the Knit for Kids program of the Peale Center, which distributes sweaters to children in need.

In 1971, she published the book The Adventure of Being a Wife, which offered advice for married women based on her and her husband's philosophy of positive thinking. This was later republished as Secrets of Staying in Love in 1984.

Peale died on February 6, 2008, in Pawling, New York, at age 101. At her death, Peale was chairman emeritus of Guideposts.

During her lifetime, Peale received multiple awards and honors, including the Horatio Alger Award for Distinguished Americans, American Association of University Women "Woman of the Year" in 2000, and four honorary doctoral degrees.
