= Guideposts =

Spiritual organization

- Guideposts
- Company logo
- Formation: 1945
- Founder: Norman Vincent Peale; Raymond Thornburg; Ruth Stafford Peale
- Founded at: New York City
- Type: Non-profit
- Registration no.: 20-3779200
- Legal status: 501(c)3
- Headquarters: Danbury, CT
- Locations: 39 Old Ridgebury Road Suite 27, Danbury, CT 06810-5122; 110 William Street, 9th Floor, New York, NY
- CEO & President: John Temple
- Subsidiaries: Guideposts Foundation, Inc; OurPrayer; Guideposts Outreach Ministries
- Website: guideposts.org

Guideposts is a spiritual non-profit organization publishing inspirational magazines, books and online material. Founded in 1945 by Norman Vincent Peale, Raymond Thornburg, and Peale's wife, Ruth Stafford Peale, with just one inaugural magazine, Guideposts has since grown to publish annual devotionals, books about faith, Christian novels, periodicals and a website.

The Guideposts organization is currently headquartered in Danbury, Connecticut, with additional offices in New York City.

== The Guideposts magazine ==
The March 1945 issue of Guideposts magazine was distributed to 10,000 households. There were four short articles, one for each week of the month. That inaugural issue contained a story by a World War I Ace, Eddie Rickenbacker, entitled I Believe In Prayer, which told of a plane crash during World War II that left eight men, in three life rafts, stranded on the Pacific Ocean.

Although a fire destroyed the magazine's circulation files in 1947, the publication was saved thanks to publicity from radio broadcaster Lowell Thomas, and an article in Reader's Digest. By 1952, there were 500,000 subscribers to the magazine and in 2018 circulation was more than 2,000,000 subscribers and receivers of the outreach gifting programs in the United States. The magazine is non-denominational, avoids politics and controversy, and for many years did not accept advertising.

== Frequency of magazine issues ==
For much of its history, Guideposts published twelve issues a year. Starting in 2019 the periodical was published ten times a year, with the June/July and December/January issues being two-month editions. Starting with the June/July 2021 issue Guideposts became a bimonthly magazine, with six issues being published each year. Each issue was expanded to 100 pages, an increase of 30 pages from earlier issues.

== Other Guideposts publications and website content ==
In addition to Guideposts there are now five other bi-monthly spiritual magazines, including Angels on Earth and All God's Creatures.

Guideposts publishes several genres of books, prayer guides, daily devotionals, and inspirational novels. The organization also provides daily devotions on their website.

== Writing contests ==
Guideposts sponsors two writing contests. The annual Guideposts Young Writers Contest awards scholarship funds to high school juniors and seniors whose personal stories are chosen for publication in the magazine. The Guideposts Writers Workshop Contest, held every other year, offers winners a free writing clinic with established authors in Rye, New York.
