= Fourth Great Awakening =

Disputed christian revival in the late 20th-century US

The Fourth Great Awakening was a Christian awakening that some scholars say took place in the United States from the 1950s to the early 1980s. The terminology is controversial, with some historians believing the religious changes that took place in the US during these years were not equivalent to those of the first three Great Awakenings. Thus, the idea of a Fourth Great Awakening itself has not been generally accepted.

Whether or not they constitute an awakening, many changes did take place. The "mainline" Protestant churches weakened sharply in both membership and influence while the most conservative denominations (such as the Southern Baptists) grew rapidly in numbers, spread across the United States, had grave internal theological battles and schisms, and became politically powerful. Other evangelical and fundamentalist denominations also expanded rapidly. At the same time, secularism grew dramatically, and the more conservative churches saw themselves battling secularism in terms of issues such as LGBT rights, abortion, and creationism. Many new religious movements emerged such as the People's Temple, Twelve Tribes communities and Heaven's Gate, and the corresponding rise of the Christian countercult movement and its secular counterpart movement.

== New movements ==
Concomitant to the power shift was a change in evangelicalism itself, with new groups arising and extant ones switching their focus. There was a new emphasis on a personal relationship with Jesus from newly styled "non-denominational" churches and "community faith centers". This period also saw the rise of non-traditional churches and megachurches with conservative theologies and a growth in parachurch organizations while mainline Protestantism lost many members. The Jesus Movement is considered by some to be part of the Fourth Great Awakening.

Vinson Synan argues that a charismatic awakening occurred between 1961 and 1982. This stemmed from a Pentecostal movement that placed emphasis on experiencing what they saw as the gifts of the Spirit, including speaking in tongues, faith healing, and prophecy. It also focused on strengthening spiritual convictions through these gifts and through signs taken to be from the Holy Spirit. Originally a Protestant movement, its influence spread to some in the Roman Catholic Church at a time when Catholic leaders were opening up to more ecumenical beliefs, to a reduced emphasis on institutional structures, and to an increased emphasis on spirituality at the lay level.

== Trends ==
Organized religion in the United States changed in the face of secularizing pressures after World War II. There was a proliferation of megachurches. Denominations such as the Assemblies of God, Southern Baptists (SBC), and The Church of Jesus Christ of Latter-day Saints (Mormons) became more popular. Three particular religious leaders were very influential: Martin Luther King Jr., Billy Graham, and Pope John Paul II. Megachurches won attention for the simple reason that 10 churches with 2,000 members each were more visible than 100 churches with 200 members each. The populist denominations' growth coincided with the simultaneous decline of the mainline bodies. While the former trend did not come at the expense of the latter (it represented different fertility and retention rates, not switching), to the media and many ordinary observers those developments signaled the aggressive swelling of religious strength.

The "mainstream" Protestant churches contracted sharply in terms of membership and influence.

After World War II, some conservative Christian denominations including the Southern Baptists, the Lutheran Church – Missouri Synod (LCMS), the Church of God, Pentecostals, Holiness groups, and Nazarenes grew rapidly in numbers and also spread nationwide. Some of these denominations, such as the Southern Baptists and Missouri Synod Lutherans, went on to face theological battles and schisms from the 1960s onward. The LCMS had a split in the 1970s with the "moderate" minority eventually helping to form the Evangelical Lutheran Church in America. The SBC would faced its own battles resulting in the Southern Baptist Convention conservative resurgence. Many of the more conservative churches went on to become politically powerful as part of the "religious right". At the same time, the influence of secularism (the belief that government and law should not be based on religion) grew dramatically, and the more conservative churches saw themselves battling secularism in terms of issues such as gay rights, abortion, and creationism.

Timothy A. Byrnes and Mary C. Segers note regarding the abortion issue, "While more theologically conservative Protestant denominations, such as the Missouri-Synod Lutherans and the Southern Baptist Convention, expressed disapproval of Roe, they became politically active only in the mid and late 1970s." The SBC itself actually passed resolutions at two Annual Meetings in support of legalized abortion; not until 1980 (in the early days of the conservative resurgence) would it reverse its position and, from that point on, continually adopt resolutions opposing it. However, the political involvement of churches ranged from actively participating in organizations such as the Moral Majority and the Christian Coalition to adopting the much more indirect and unorganized approach of the LCMS.

=== Outside Christianity ===
Other religious such as Hinduism and Buddhism also saw growth during this period.

Anti-cult activism reached a peak in the US during the 1960s and 1970s as a result of religious uncertainty, and a Christian countercult movement existed alongside the secular movement.

== See also ==
- Christianity and politics
- "The 'Me' Decade and the Third Great Awakening" – 1976 essay on American culture by Tom Wolfe
