= Académie Colarossi =

Art school in Paris

Coordinates: 48°50′32″N 2°19′51″E

Location
- 10 rue de la Grande-Chaumière; Paris; France

Information
- School type: Art school
- Founded: 1870
- Closed: 1930

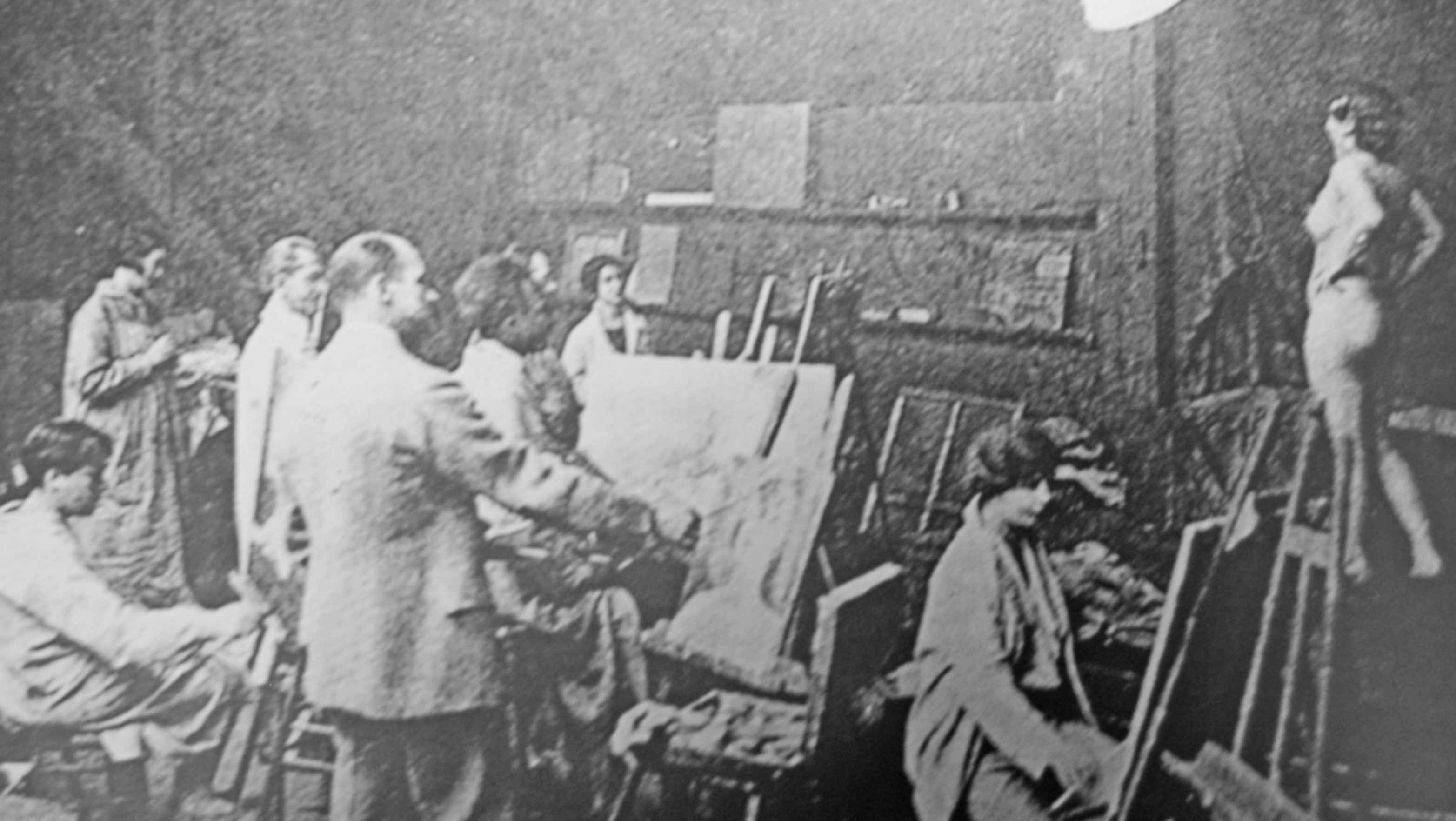
Academie Colarossi life drawing class, 1908

The Académie Colarossi (1870–1930) was an art school in Paris founded in 1870 by the Italian model and sculptor Filippo Colarossi. It was originally located on the Île de la Cité, and it moved in 1879 to 10 rue de la Grande-Chaumière in the 6th arrondissement. The school closed in the 1930s.

== History ==
A precursor art school in the same location was the Académie Suisse, founded in 1815. The former Académie Suisse location on the Île de la Cité was bought by Italian sculptor Filippo Colarossi in 1870, and in 1879 it moved to 10 rue de la Grande-Chaumière in the 6th arrondissement.

The Académie was established in the 19th century as an alternative to the government-sanctioned École des Beaux Arts that had, in the eyes of many promising young artists at the time, become far too conservative. Along with its equivalent Académie Julian, and unlike the official École des Beaux Arts, the Colarossi school accepted female students and allowed them to draw from the nude male model.

Around 1879, two salon painters taught the Académie classes, the Japanese-influenced painter Raphaël Collin and French academic-style painter Gustave Courtois. Among its other instructors were the influential French sculptor, Jean Antoine Injalbert and painter Pascal Dagnan-Bouveret. In 1893, the progressive Académie appointed the American artist Wilhelmina Douglas Hawley (1860–1958) as its first female teacher.

In 1922, sculptor Henry Moore attended, although not as a student. Moore took life-drawing classes that were open to the general public, paid for with a book of inexpensive tickets. The evening classes were progressively timed – one hour, then 20 minutes, then five minutes, then one – to develop various drawing skills.

The school closed in the 1930s. Around that time, Madame Colarossi burned the priceless school archives in retaliation for her husband's philandering.

== Notable alumni ==
At Académie Colarossi among the female attendees were German painter Thea Schleusner, Amedeo Modigliani's muse, Jeanne Hébuterne; Scottish Impressionist Bessie MacNicol; Canadian Impressionist Emily Carr; Transatlantic painter-poet Mina Loy, and French sculptor Camille Claudel, who was also a student of Rodin's. Noted also for its classes in life sculpting, the school attracted many foreign students, including a large number from the United States.

(Austria)	Austria	Zofia Albinowska-Minkiewiczowa – Aloys Wach
(Australia)	Australia	Alice Muskett
(Bulgaria)	Bulgaria	Pascin
(Canada)	Canada	Frederic Marlett Bell-Smith – Emily Carr – Ralston Crawford – Prudence Heward – George Loftus Noyes – Maurice Prendergast – George Agnew Reid – Boardman Robinson – Marc Aurèle de Foy Suzor-Coté
(China)	China	Georgette Chen
(Czech Republic)	Czech Republic	František Bílek – Josef Čapek – Alfons Mucha
(Denmark)	Denmark	Cecilie Dahl
(Ecuador)	Ecuador	Camilo Egas
(Estonia)	Estonia	Adamson-Eric – Konrad Mägi – Karl Pärsimägi – Nikolai Triik – Eduard Wiiralt
(Finland)	Finland	Helene Schjerfbeck – Ellen Thesleff
(France)	France	Hélène de Beauvoir – Camille Claudel – Paul Gauguin – Marcel Gromaire – Jeanne Hébuterne – Jean Lurçat – Émile Schuffenecker – Theophile-Alexandre Steinlen – Fabien Fabiano
(Germany)	Germany	Karl Albert Buehr – George Grosz – Hans Hofmann – Wilhelm Lehmbruck – Paula Modersohn-Becker
(Greece)	Greece	Sophia Laskaridou
(Hungary)	Hungary	Emile Lahner – Camilla Koffler (Ylla)
(Republic of Ireland)	Ireland	Eileen Gray - Sean O'Sullivan
(Italy)	Italy	Romaine Brooks – Amedeo Modigliani
(Israel)	Israel	Avigdor Stematsky
(Japan)	Japan	Kume Keiichiro – Seiki Kuroda – Henry Sugimoto
(Lithuania)	Lithuania	Jacques Lipchitz
(Norway)	Norway	Nikolai Astrup – Jean Heiberg – Olaf Gulbransson – Wilhelm Rasmussen – Aage Storstein – Ingebrigt Vik – Gustav Wentzel – Cora Sandel
(New Zealand)	New Zealand	Sydney Thompson – Helen Stewart – Frances Hodgkins
(Poland)	Poland	Stanisław Jackowski – Alfons Karpiński – Józef Mehoffer – Mela Muter - Włodzimierz Tetmajer – Max Weber – Stanisław Wyspiański- Eugeniusz Zak
(Romania)	Romania	Reuven Rubin
(Russia)	Russia	Gleb W. Derujinsky – Alexander Golovin – Anna Golubkina – Eugene Lanceray – Konstantin Somov – Emil Wiesel- Nicolai Ivanovich Kravchenko – Nikolai Pomansky
(Spain)	Spain	Hermenegildo Anglada Camarasa
(Sweden)	Sweden	Carl Eldh – Arvid Nyholm – Jenny Nyström – Hanna Pauli - Anna Wengberg
(Switzerland)	Switzerland	Fritz Glarner – Oswald Pilloud – Louis Soutter – Heini Waser
(Uruguay)	Uruguay	Juan José Calandria
(United Kingdom)	United Kingdom	Lamorna Birch – John Duncan Fergusson – Edward Halliday – Isobel Heath – Richard Jack - Mina Loy – Laura Muntz Lyall – Ottilie Maclaren Wallace – Bessie MacNicol - Cedric Morris – Samuel Peploe – Elizabeth Polunin – Dod Procter – Robert William Service – Stansmore Dean Stevenson - Edith Grace Wheatley - Sydney Curnow Vosper – Amy Krauss
(United States)	United States	Lucy Bacon – Cecilia Beaux – Charles Bittinger – George Henry Clements – Rinaldo Cuneo – Charles Demuth – Eyre de Lanux – Florence Esté – Clara Fasano - Lyonel Feininger – Meta Vaux Warrick Fuller – Marion Greenwood – Elizabeth Orton Jones – Alice De Wolf Kellogg – Walt Kuhn – Jean Mannheim – Isamu Noguchi – George Loftus Noyes – Pauline Palmer — Lilla Cabot Perry – Alice Morgan Wright – Stanton Macdonald-Wright – Elenore Plaisted Abbott – George Raab – Alice Schille – Janet Scudder – Armstrong Sperry – Inga Stephens Pratt Clark – Adrien Voisin – Challis Walker – Nan Watson — Adele Fay Williams — Mahonri Young

== Other students ==
- Ethel Blanchard Collver
- Rose Connor
- Gustave-Claude-Etienne Courtois
- Camilo Egas
- Hester Frood
- Paul Haefliger
- Cornelia Ellis Hildebrandt
- Louis Kahan
- Richard E. Miller
- Georgina Moutray Kyle
- Josephine Muntz Adams
- Maurice Prendergast
- Lucy May Stanton
- Mary K. Trotter
- Mary Jett Franklin
- Clara Westhoff
- George Grosz
- Clara Miller Burd
- Nora Houston

== See also ==
- Category:Académie Colarossi alumni
