= Collver =

Surname list

Collver is a surname. Notable people with the surname include:

- Bill Collver (1867–1888), American baseball player
- Dick Collver (1936–2014), Canadian politician
- Ethel Blanchard Collver (1875–1955), American painter

== See also ==
- Collier (surname)
