= Thea Schleusner =

German artist

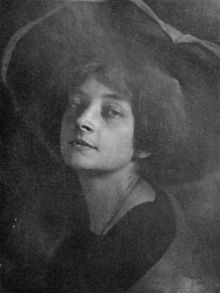
- Photograph by Rudolf Dührkoop (c.1905)
- Born: 30 April 1879 30 April 1879; Wittenberg, Germany
- Died: 1964 (aged 84–85); Berlin, Germany
- Known for: Painting

Thea Schleusner (1879-1964) was a German painter.

== Biography ==
Schleusner was born on 30 April 1879 in Wittenberg, Germany. She studied in Paris at the Académie Colarossi and the Académie Moderne. In Germany, she studied with Franz Skarbina and Reinhold Lepsius. She settled in Berlin where she painted portraits of Emil Nolde, Albert Einstein, and Friedrich Nietzsche. Much of her work was destroyed in a bombing during World War II. She was a member of the Verein Berliner Künstler.

Schleusner died in 1964 in Berlin. Her work is in the collection of the Musée d'Orsay.

== Major exhibition in Wittenberg in 2024 ==
In 2024, Schleusner was honoured for the first time since her death with a major solo exhibition. Several hundred paintings, drawings and other objects were presented at four locations in her native town of Lutherstadt Wittenberg. This exhibition by the ‘Naser Foundation of (Re)Discovered Art’ was preceded by various smaller exhibition projects and publications with the collaboration of publicist Mathias Tietke. In November 2024, a counterstatement to statements by Mathias Tietke was published in a press release by the Naser Foundation. The statement complained of ‘a number of false statements regarding the (...) exhibition’ as well as ‘a series of defamations and slanders that Mr Tietke has been using for years against members of the foundation’ and also ‘Lutherstadt Wittenberg and its institutions and employees’. Tietke has therefore ‘already faced a number of injunctions in the past’.
