= Clara Miller Burd =

American stained glass designer and children's book and magazine cover illustrator

Clara Miller Burd (17 May 1873 – 11 November 1933) was an American stained glass designer and illustrator.

== Early life ==
Burd was born on 17 May 1873 in New York City, United States of America to Charles Edgar Burd and Amelia Roe Burd of Patchogue, New York. She was educated at Chase School and the National Academy of Design in New York. In 1898, she traveled to Paris, France to continue her art education where she became a student of Gustave-Claude-Etienne Courtois at the Académie Colarossi.

== Career ==
After returning from France, Burd worked as a stained glass designer at the Tiffany Glass and Decorating Company in New York. She also worked at the J&R Lamb Studios as well as at the Church Glass and Decorating Company.

Notable designs include :

- St. Andrew's Episcopal Church, Highland Park, Pittsburgh. The East and West transept windows. (Completed while employed with the Church Glass and Decorating Company)
- First Church of Christ, Pittsfield, Massachusetts. The memorial window to Dr. William Davis titled Angels of Life and Death (Independent design.)
- West End Collegiate Church, New York City, New York. The East transept window to the memory of Anna Van Nostrand titled Morning cometh and the shadows flee away - a 16 foot high full length image of Christ standing to the side with his hand raised to the rising sun with two kneeling angels at the base of the window on either side.(Independent design.)
- Woodlawn Cemetery, New York. Mausoleum of William Bradley. Window titled Memory
- Forest Hill Cemetery, Utica, New York. Mausoleum of James S. Sherman. Vice-President. Memorial window of Easter lilies with a background of antique ruby glass.
- Lakeview Cemetery, Cleveland, Ohio. Memorial window of river flowing through a lily bed, with a background of pink sky and a descending dove.
- Trinity Episcopal Church, Roslyn, Long Island, New York. Windows presented by Mr Clarence H. Mackay. (Made by Church Glass and Decorating Company.)
- St Paul's Episcopal Church in Englewood, NJ ("The Last Supper" reredos, signed)
- Plymouth Congregational Church, Milwaukee, Wisconsin. Seventh memorial window, largest in the church; depicts an angel.
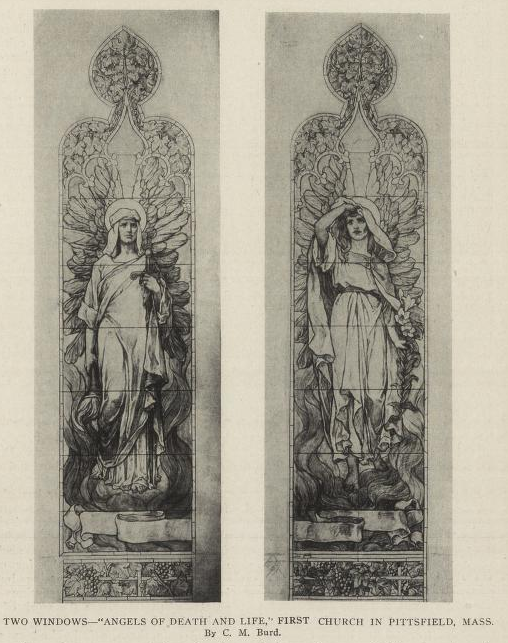
Stained glass window design for two windows for the First Church in Pittsfield, Massachusetts titled Angels of Life and Death

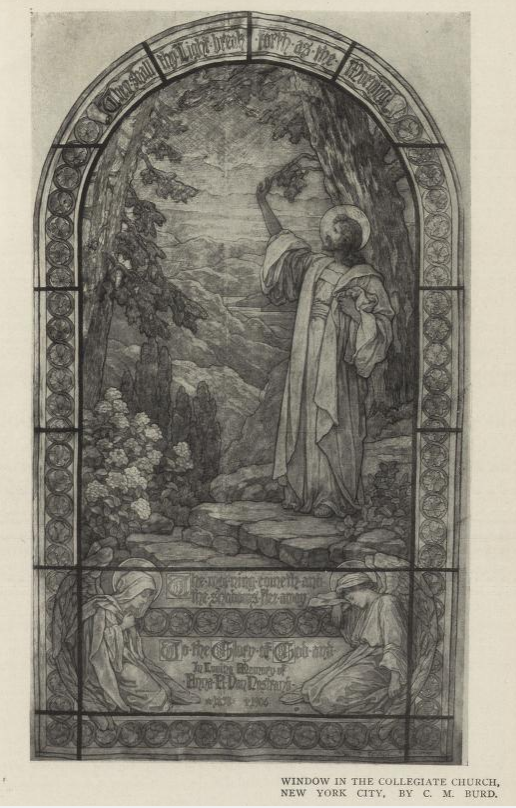
Stained glass window design for Collegiate Church, New York City titled The morning cometh and the shadows flee away

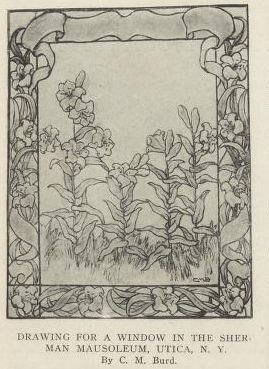
Mausoleum stained glass window design to the memory of James S. Sherman, Vice-President

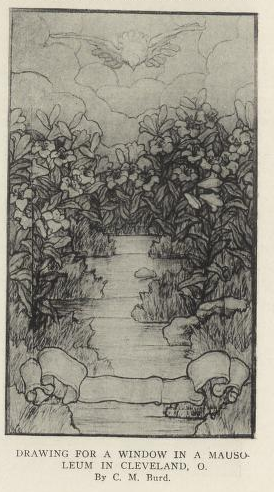
Mausoleum stained glass window design

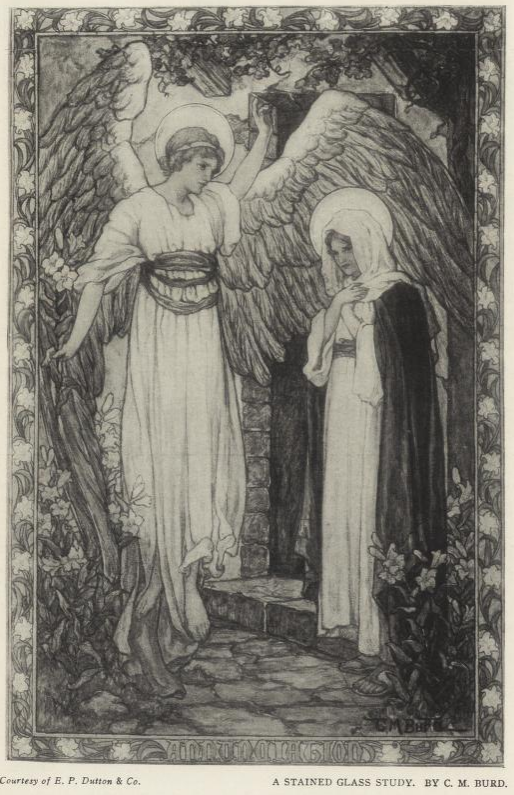
A stained glass window design titled Annunciations

In addition to working with the stained glass art firms Burd also designed independently. She registered the copyright in some of her stained glass designs and her illustrations

As well as her stained glass window design work, Burd also illustrated of children's books and magazine covers. She signed her work C M Burd or CMB.

Initials of the artist Clara Miller Burd

Signature of the artist Clara Miller Burd

== Illustrations ==
The books and magazines she illustrated include:

- Tennyson, Alfred. In Memoriam. Surgis & Walton Co., New York, 1909
- Stall, Sylvanus. With the children on Sundays, through eye-gate, and ear-gate into the city of child-soul. The Uplift Publishing Company, Philadelphia, 1911
- Olcott, Frances Jenkins. Good Stories for Great Holidays Houghton Mifflin Company, 1914
- Marks, Jeannette. The Children in the Wood Stories. Milton Bradley, Springfield, 1919
- Bailey, Carolyn Sherwood. Stories of great adventures (adapted from the classics), Milton Bradley, Springfield, 1919
- Cover illustration for Modern Priscilla August 1922
- Spyri, Johanna. Heidi. The John C. Winston Company, Philadelphia, 1924
- Dodge, Mary Mapes. Hans Brinker or the Silver Skates The John C. Winston Company, Philadelphia, 1925
- Alcott, Louisa May. Jo's Boys. Little, Brown & Co., 1925
- Lawrence, Josephine. Next door neighbors. Cupples & Leon, New York, 1926
- Yonge, Charlotte M. A Book of Golden Deeds. Macmillan Co., 1927
- Alcott, Louisa May. An Old Fashioned Girl. The John C. Winston Company, Philadelphia, 1928
- Alcott, Louisa May. Little men: Life at Plumfield with Jo's boys. The John C. Winston Company, Philadelphia, 1928
- Edgeworth, Maria. Simple Susan and Other Tales. Macmillan Co., New York, 1929
- Dickens, Charles. Dickens' stories about children, retold and with an introduction by Elizabeth Lodor Merchant. The John C. Winston Company, Philadelphia, circa 1929
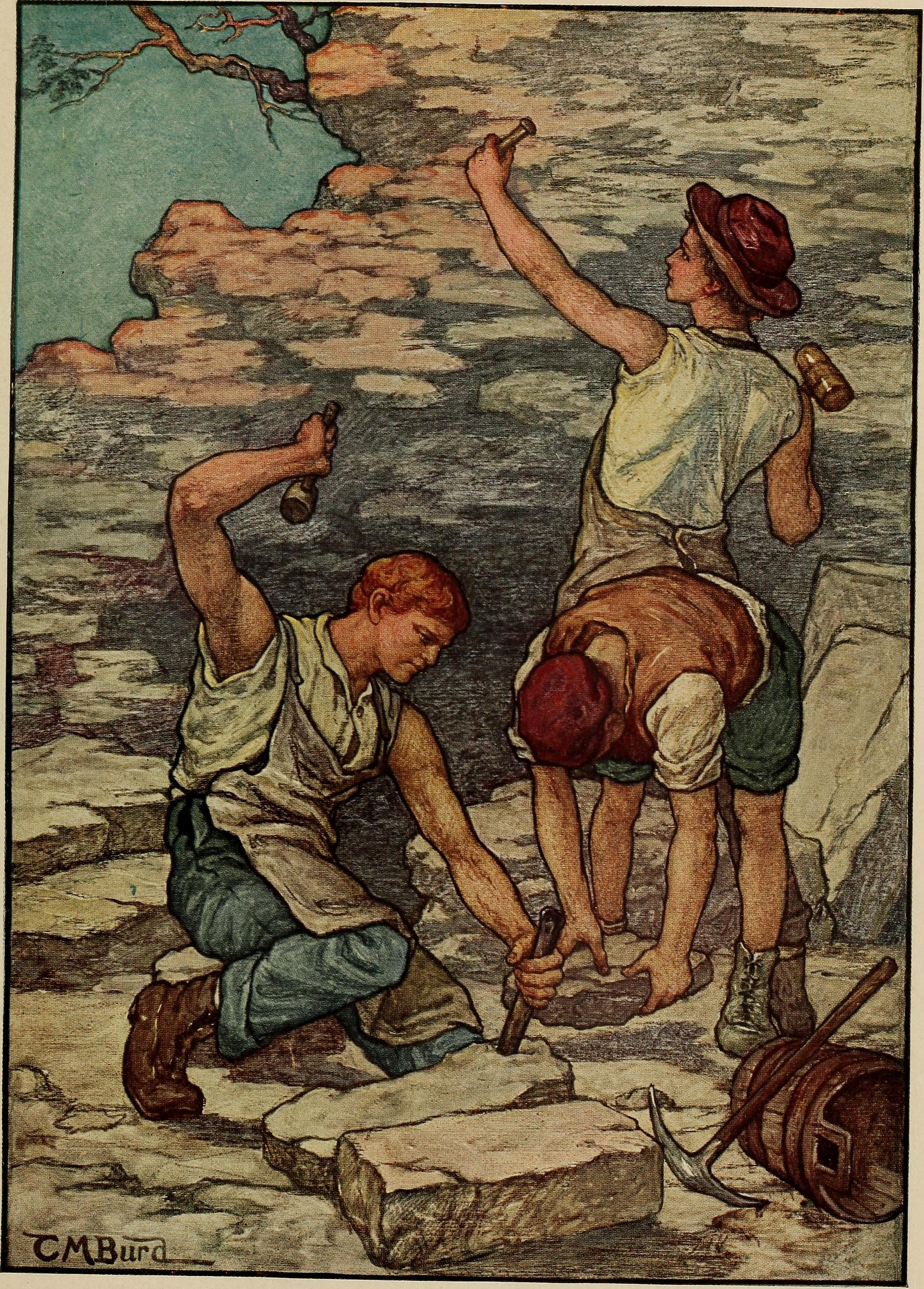
Stones Being Prepared for a Great Building by C M Burd

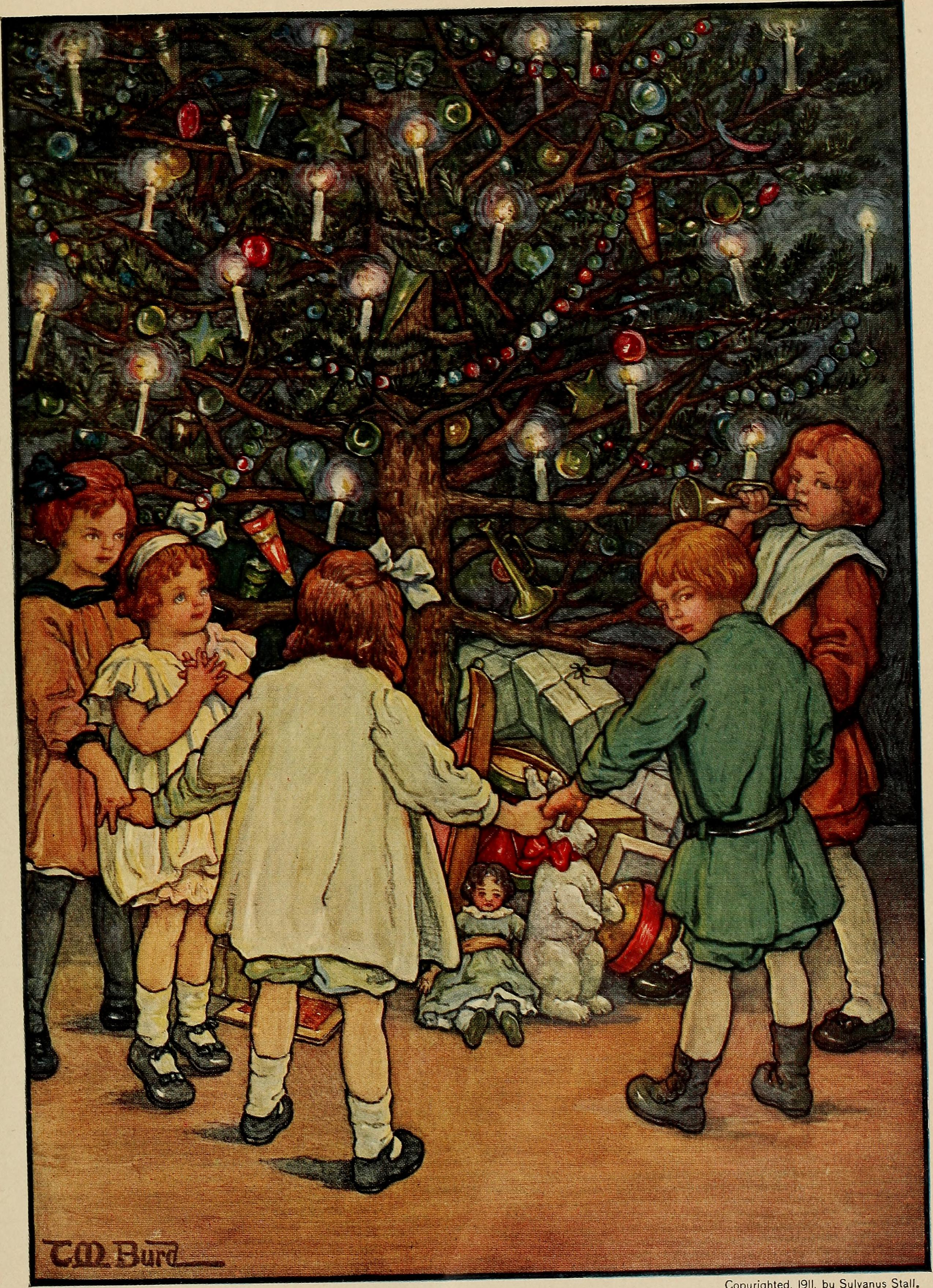
The Christmas Tree by C M Burd

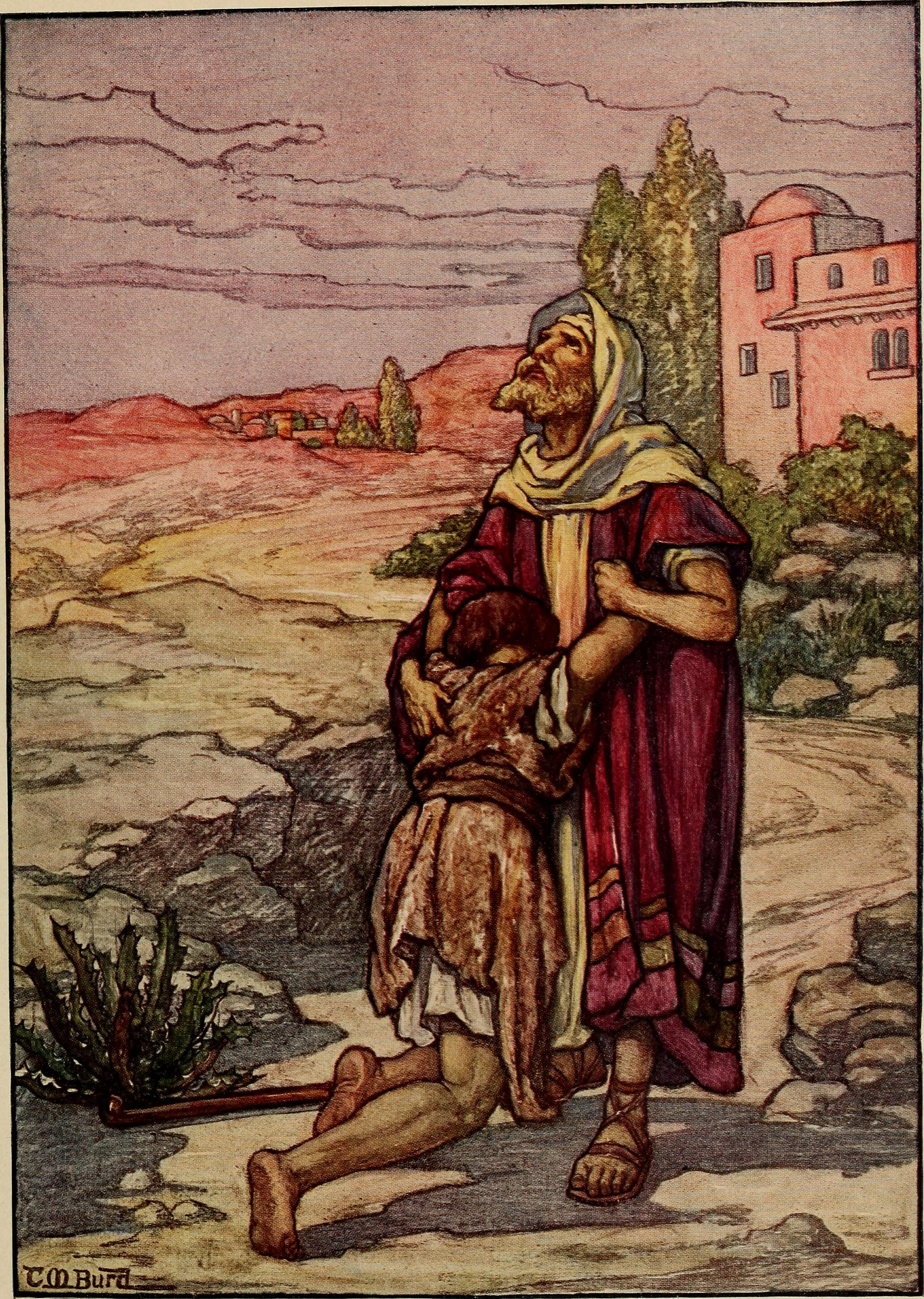
The Returning Prodigal by C M Burd

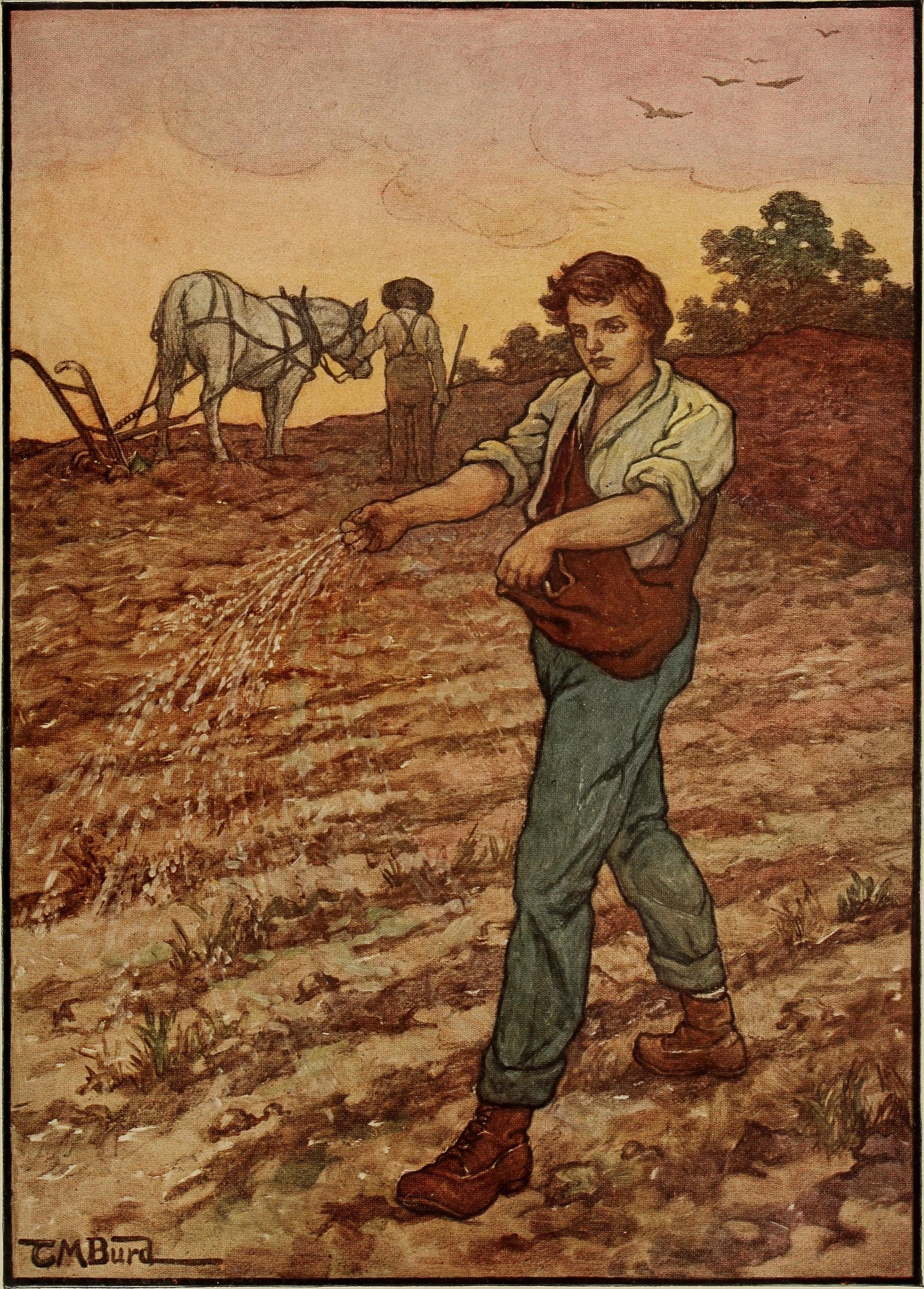
Behold a Sower went Forth to Sow by C M Burd

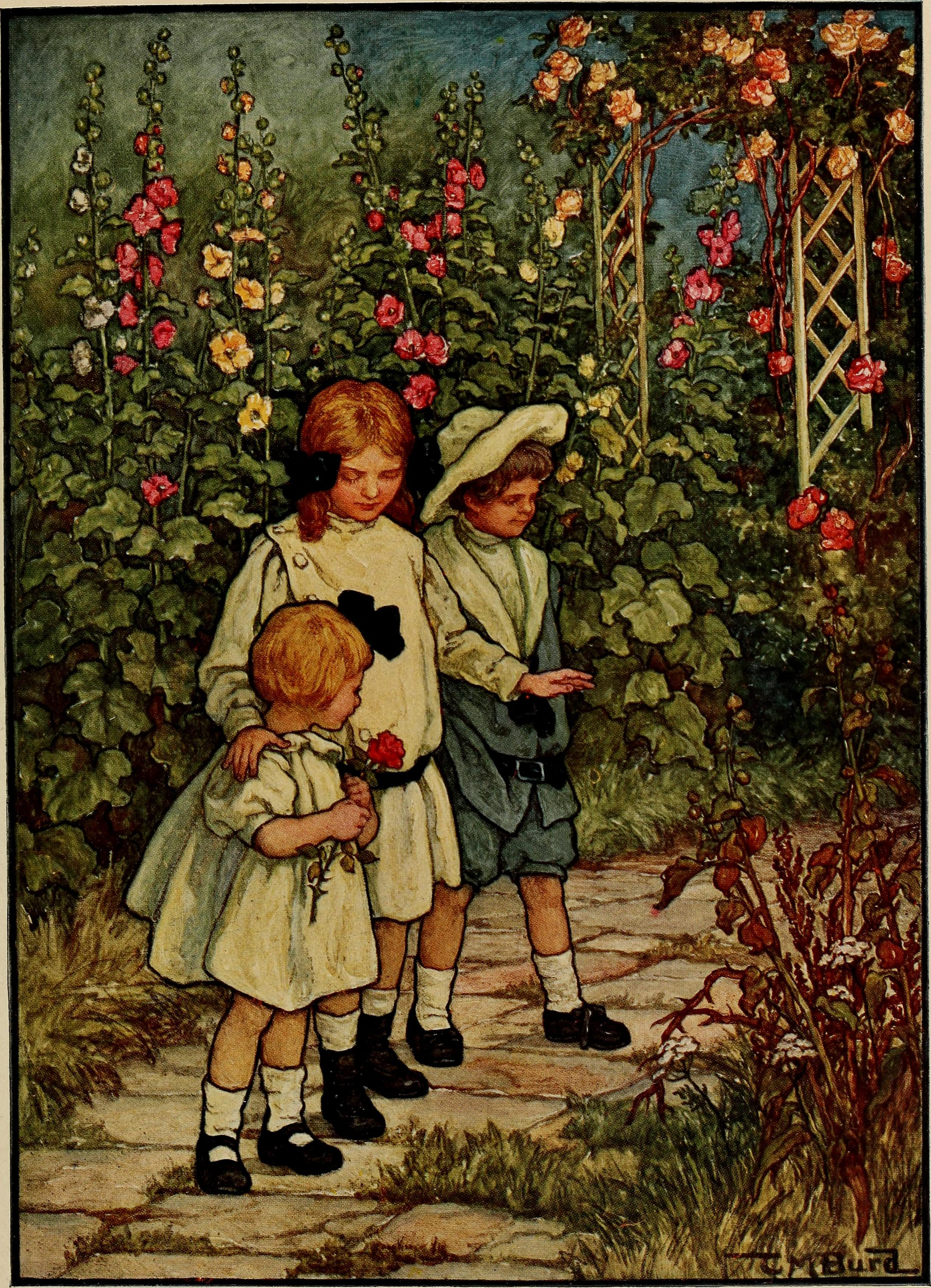
Wayside Weeds and Garden Flowers by C M Burd

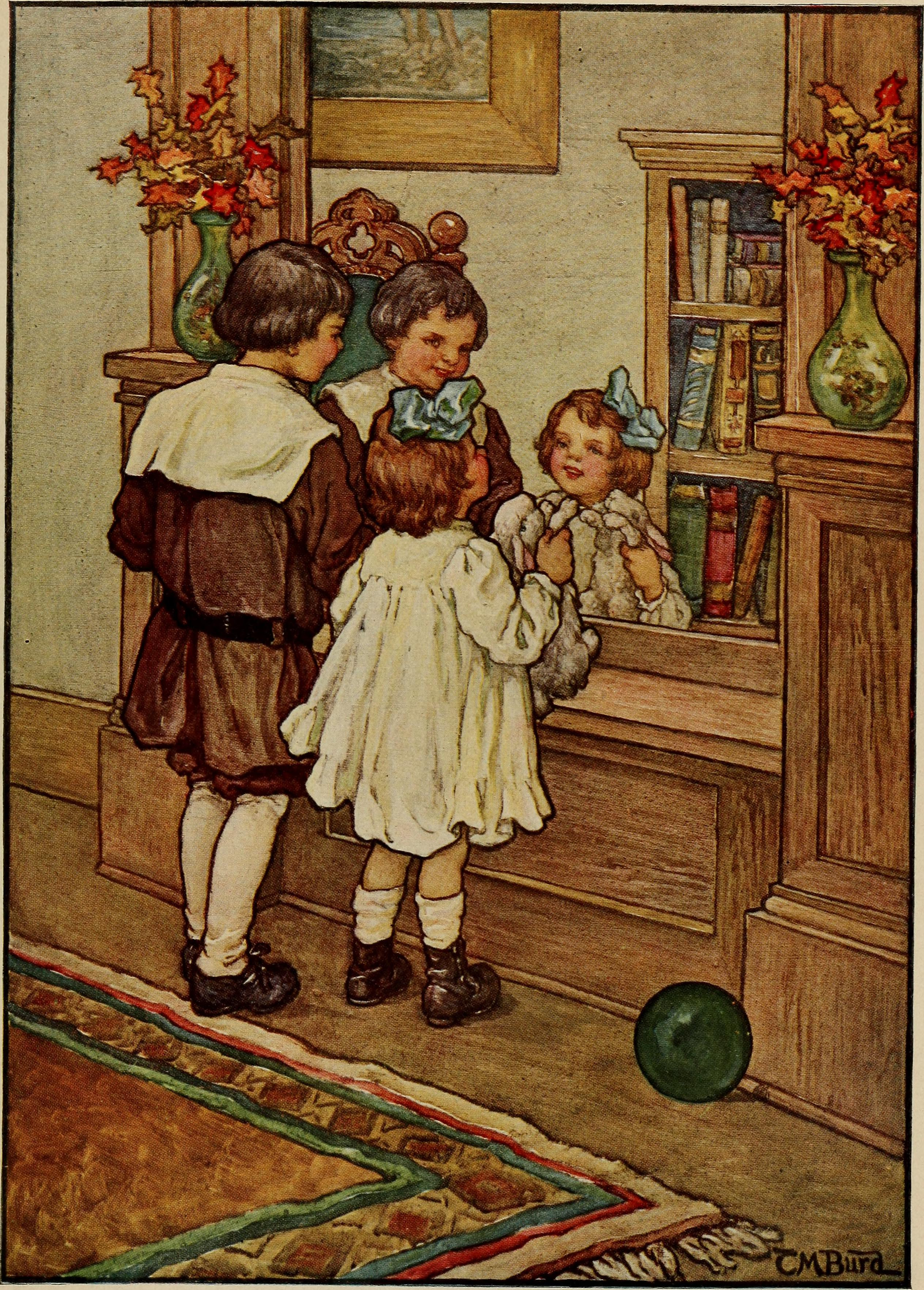
Seeing Ourselves in the Looking-Glass of Gods Law by C M Burd

Paul McCartney used two illustrations for his 1972 Single Mary Had A Little Lamb for the front and rear cover and the labels.

== Exhibitions and recognition ==
Her work has been exhibited at the National Academy of Design in 1900, the annual exhibition of the American Water Color Society, New York in 1900, the annual exhibition of the Architectural League of New York in 1905, and The Whitney Museum of American Art in 1984

She lived in Montclair, New York until her death on 11 November 1933.
