= Juan José Calandria =

Uruguayan painter and sculptor

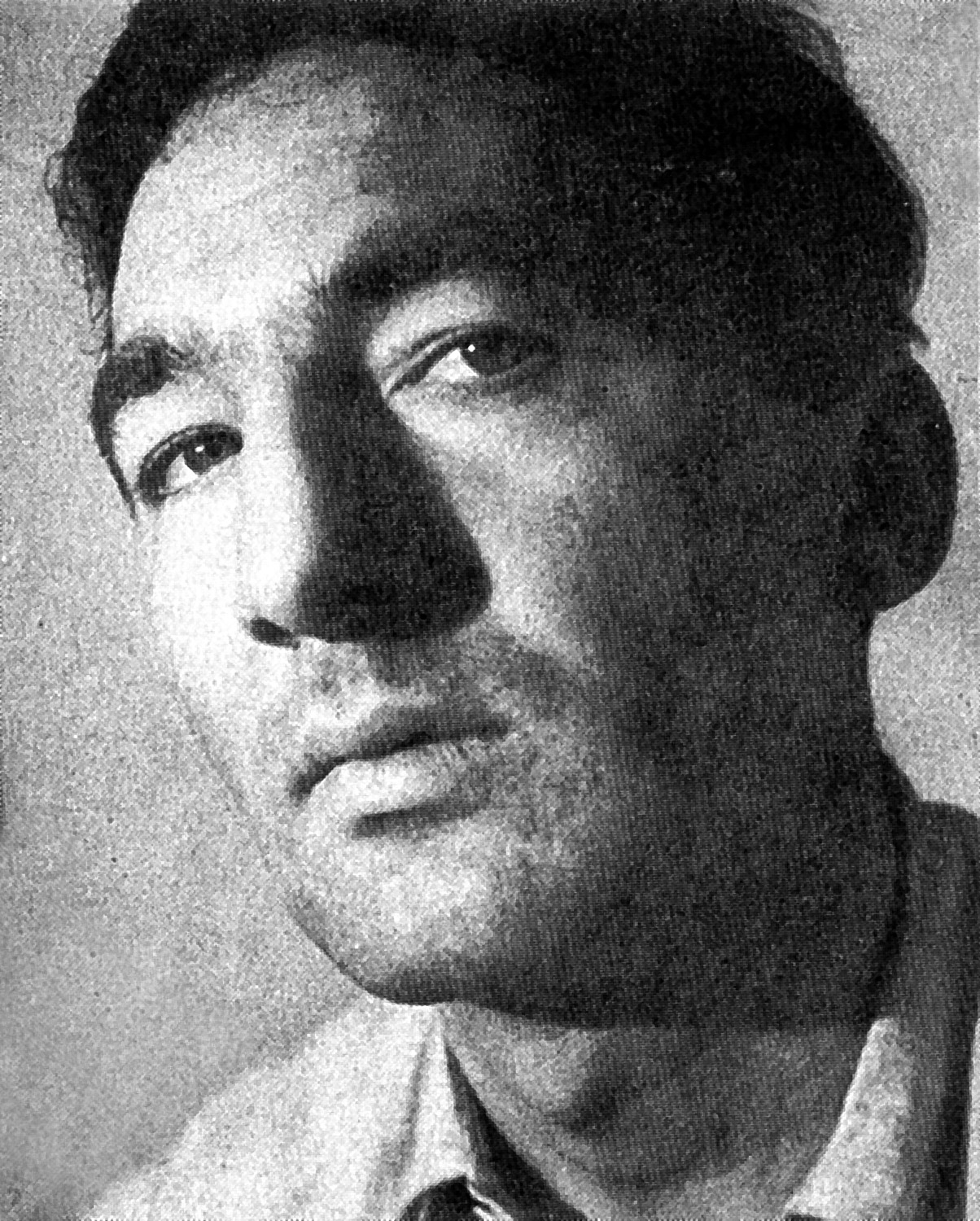
- Juan José Calandria in 1962
- Born: December 12, 1902; Canelones, Uruguay
- Died: July 18, 1980 (aged 77) possibly France
- Education: Escuela de Artes Decorativos, Escuela Industrial
- Known for: Sculpture, Painting
- Style: Abstract, Modernist
- Spouse: Challis Walker
- Children: Andres Calandria
- Awards: Gold Medal, 1937 Paris Exhibition

Juan José Calandria (December 12, 1902 – July 18, 1980) was a Uruguayan painter and sculptor.

== Biography ==
=== Early life ===
Calandria was born on December 12, 1902, in Canelones, Uruguay.

Upon graduating from school, he studied at the Escuela de Artes Decorativos and the Escuela Industrial in Montevideo with an architectural career in mind. He became so interested in sculpture, however, that he soon devoted his entire time to studies in that field.

By the time he was eighteen, Calandria had had a one-man show with ensuing honors and commissions. At this time, he also won the most important art scholarship offered in Uruguay—a four-year period of study abroad. When it was decided that he was too young to accept this honor, he was not discouraged. He continued his studies and won the award again when he was twenty-two. He won his first gold medal and the Grand Prize at the Exposición Agropecuria e Industrial in Canelones, Uruguay.

=== Career ===
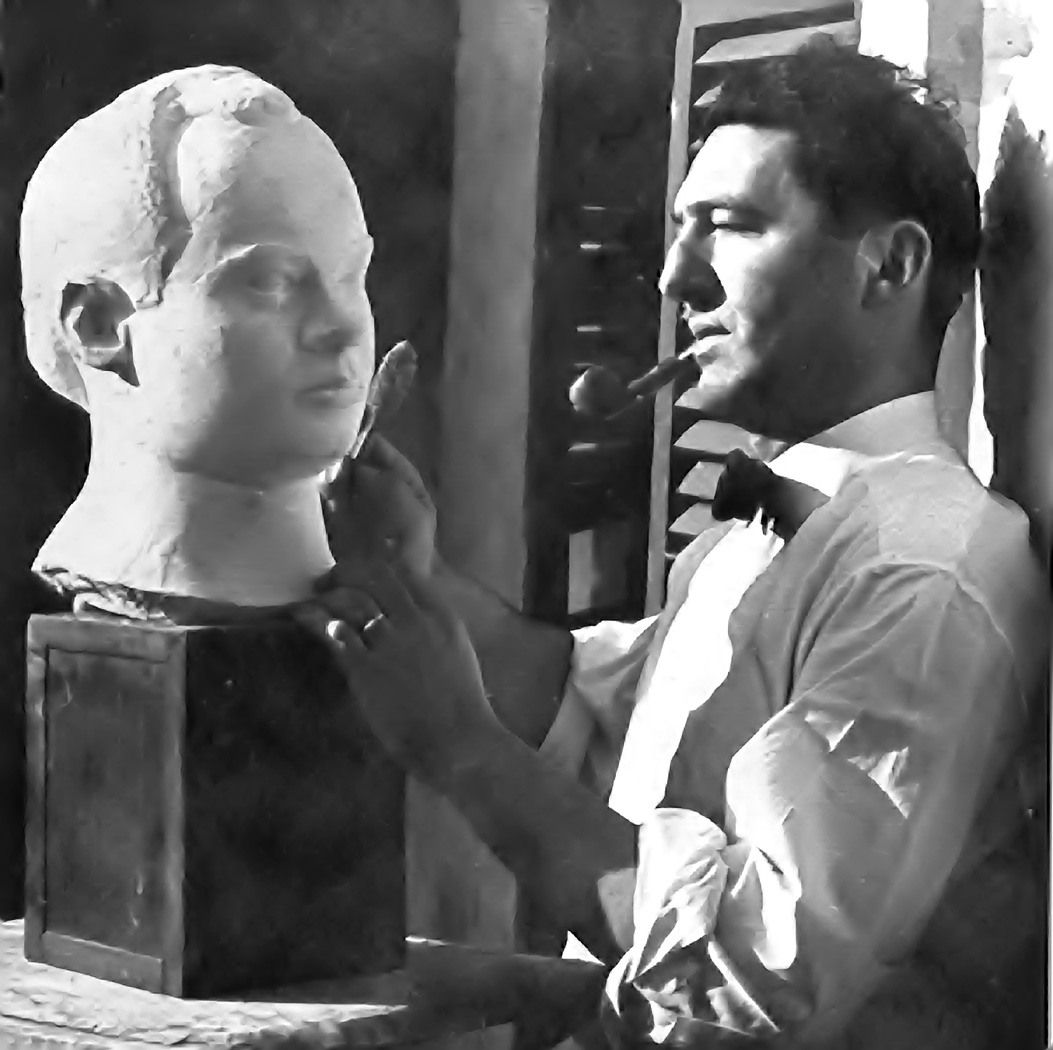
Juan José Calandria - 1962

After extensive travels in Europe, Calandria settled in Paris where he stayed for the next fourteen years, working under the guidance of Antoine Bourdelle, Charles Despiau and Marcel Gimond. He soon became Gimond's assistant at the Académie Colarassi and also held classes in his own studio. Calandria was awarded the gold medal at the 1937 Paris Exhibition, where several of his sculptures were on exhibit in the Uruguayan Pavilion. His work was well known and admired in the French capital by 1939, where he exhibited in many galleries, the Salon des Tuileries and Printemps, and the Exposition des Artistes Contemporains, the latter a great honor.

War was declared while Calandria was vacationing in Greece. He sailed at once for New York City, spending nearly a year there and exhibiting several times. Thereafter, he went back to Uruguay and in 1941 was appointed Consul to New Orleans. He was married that same year in New York to Challis Walker and moved to the south where the Calandrias have lived ever since.

Calandria has exhibited his paintings and sculpture in North and South America and in Europe.

When he retired from Consular duties in 1958, he was then free to give all of his time to his art, which flourished both in quality and success. At about the same time, his work became increasingly abstract and remained so during his lifetime.

He taught sculpture in Paris, drawing at the New Orleans Arts and Crafts Club in New Orleans during World War II, and held classes in painting and sculpture for adults and children in his Pontalba studio in the French Quarter. Later, he held classes in sculpture for several years in the Calandria School of Painting and Sculpture located at Gallier Hall and, thereafter, in his Jefferson Avenue studio. He also gave lectures and demonstrations in the New Orleans area.

His exhibition at the International Trade Mart was his last large and major exhibition. Plagued with arthritis, he nevertheless continued to work on his knees, as any other position was impossible. Forced to stop sculpture, he continued to paint prolifically and was more than prepared for another large one-man show. However, in 1978, a new illness set in. Another exhibition would have been too difficult and during the last two years of his life, he stopped painting altogether. He died on July 18, 1980.

He was the first New Orleans artist to have his work, in this case a sculpture, purchased for the New Orleans Museum of Art's permanent collection.

This biography was written by Challis Walker Calandria, the wife of Juan Jose Calandria, and provided to Wikipedia by his son Andres Calandria.
