= Nicolai Ivanovich Kravchenko =

Russian painter (1867–1941)

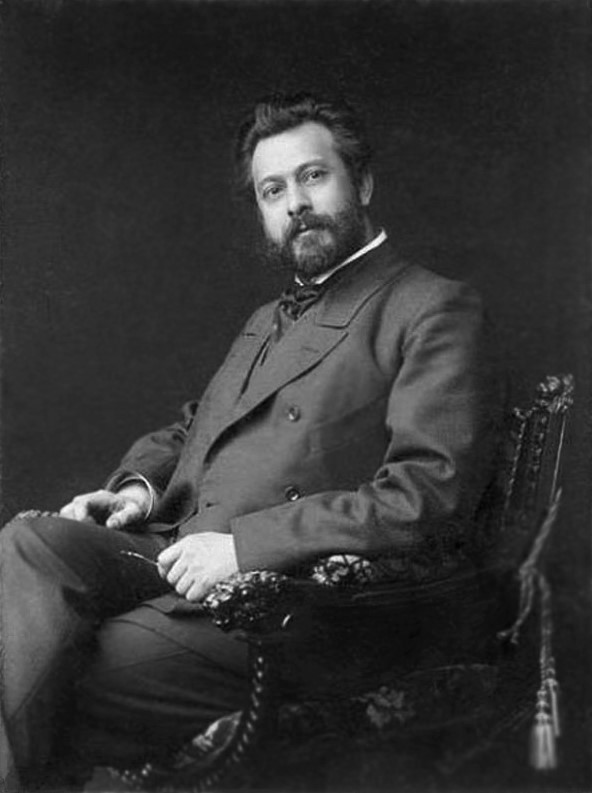
- Born: 1867; Simferopol
- Died: 1941 (aged 73–74); Leningrad
- Citizenship: Russian Empire; USSR
- Education: Richelieu Lyceum, Imperial Academy of Arts, Academie Colarossi, Academie Julian
- Occupation: painting
- Style: battle, portrait, landscape

Nicolai Ivanovich Kravchenko (Russian: Никола́й Ива́нович Кра́вченко, Ukrainian: Микола Іванович Кра́вченко; 1867–1941) was a battle painter, journalist and writer from the Russian Empire and later the Soviet Union.

== Biography ==
Kravchenko studied at Odessa's gymnasium and municipal Realschule, and Odessa's school of fine arts, which he graduated from in 1888 with a silver medal. In the same year Kravchenko moved to Saint Petersburg and entered the class of battle painting at the Imperial Academy of Arts. He was immediately taken to the second course to Bogdan Willewalde.

The collision with old professors and unwillingness to obey their daily requirements led the young artist to the realization that his further stay at the academy was useless. That's why he came back to Odessa. In 1891, Kravchenko went to Paris, where at the same time he worked in both Academie Julian and the Academie Colarossi. With the help of his friend, who then was studying in Ecole des beaux arts, Kravchenko drawings were shown to Professor Jerome, who willingly took him as a student. Lessons at French academy of fine arts didn't interfere with artist's work at home and drawing some portraits. One of them (Dr's. Brissot) was taken to the Salon Champs de Mars and attracted the attention of Paris press. In 1893 Kravchenko showed his sketch of a Russian girl student at the same salon.

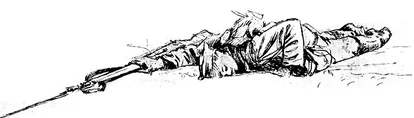
The detail of the painting "Taking Beijing"

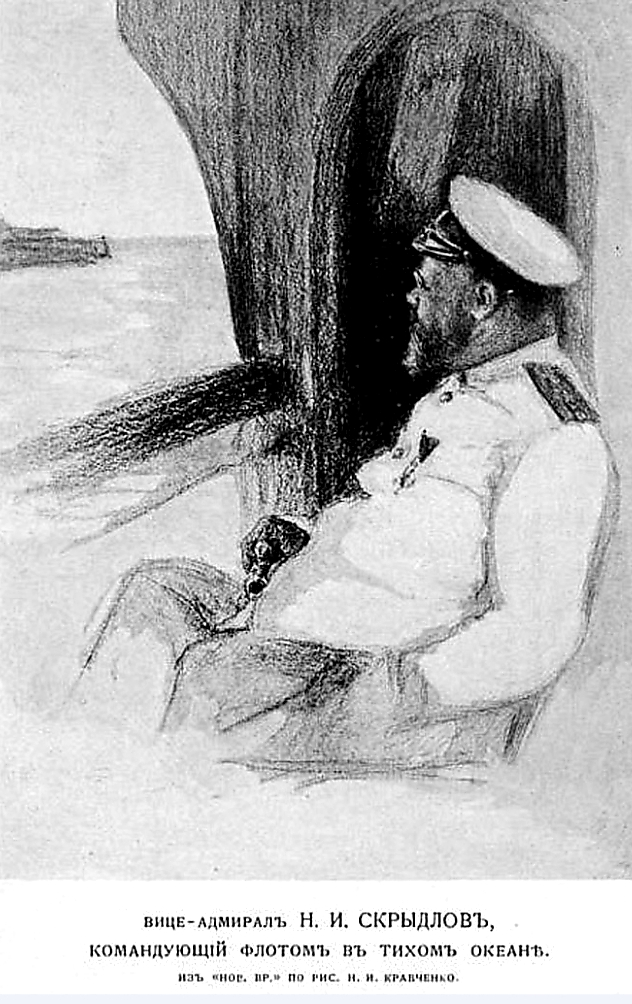
Admiral N.I.Skrydlov. Commander of the Russian squadron in the Pacific Ocean 1900-1902 Artist N. Kravchenko.

At the same time he got acquainted with Suvorin and Skolkovsky. They persuaded Kravchenko to move to Saint Petersburg.

When he returned to the Russian Empire, Kravchenko performed a series of portraits of prominent contemporary figures from nature. When Kravchenko got close with officer environment of the guard regiments in St. Petersburg, he got an access to encampments and maneuvers and made a series of drawings, depicting the life and types of soldiers of the Leib Guard of Pavlovsky Regiment, which was able to demonstrate to Emperor Nicholas II in 1900 at a regimental holiday. At the beginning of 1902, Kravchenko went to Manchuria and China with the aim to collect material to illustrate the campaign of Russian troops in China in 1900-1901. He visited Mukden, Liaoyang, Port Arthur, Takuya, Tianjin, Beijing, Tunjou, Yingkou and some places of Great Wall of China.

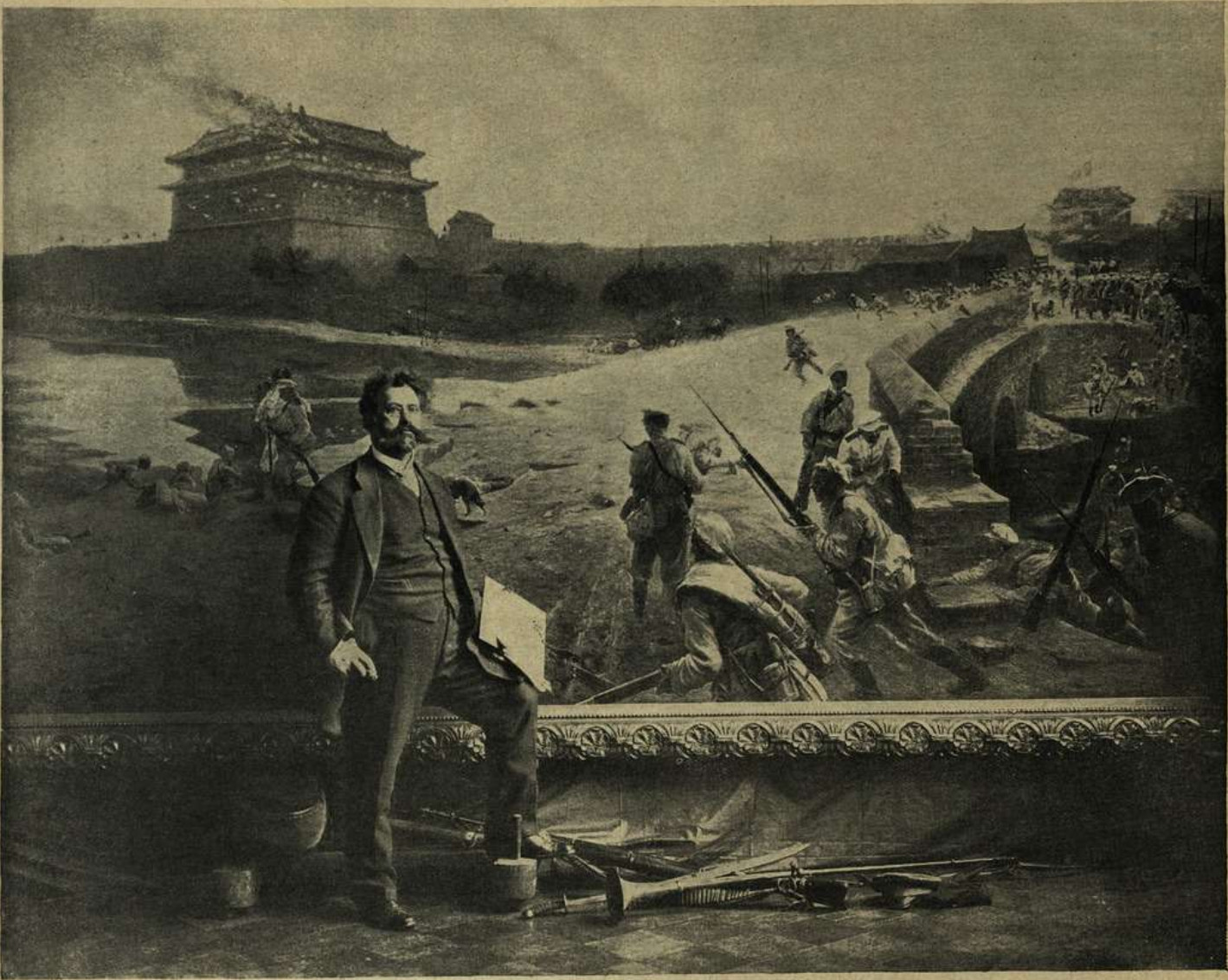
N.I. Kravchenko on the background of the painting "The Taking of Beijing"

His correspondence from there was published in the journal New Time and attracted a lot of attention. All his impressions about this trip were collected in his own illustrated book: To China (St.Petersburg, 1904). After returning from a trip, Kravchenko was honored to be invited to Livadia, where he demonstrated to the Sovereign a report on his journey in the form of several hundred studies, drawings and sketches, which illustrated battlefields of 1900, types of soldiers and Chinese, views of Beijing and many other items. With the outbreak of the Russo-Japanese War, Kravchenko went to the Far East and was a witness of the death of battleship Petropavlovsk in Port Arthur, which he captured and vividly described in New Time. Kravchenko's painting "The death of the destroyer Petropavlovsk on Japanese mines" is situated in exposition of the Central Naval Museum of St. Petersburg. At the theaters of war, Kravchenko did not stay very long. His impressions about the events of the Russo-Japanese War are described by him in the book To the War (St. Petersburg, 1906).The events that he reproduced in a series of drawings that are placed in the «Manchuria» albums of the artist Martynov, in the «Chronicle of the War with Japan», in edition by D. N. Dubensky's and in the Chronicle of the War with Japan on land and at sea edition by V. Berezovsky's . By the order of the Russian Emperor, Kravchenko completed a large portrait and a half-length portrait with the help of colored pencils. This portrait was brought to Nicholas II.

In 1910, philanthropist and collector Princess M.K. Tenisheva purchased the watercolor "Chinese Soldier" by Kravchenko for the Russian Museum, where it is still situated in the art department.

The fond of Alexandrinsky Theater in St. Petersburg acquired for his collection Kravchenko's portrait of the famous Russian prose writer and actor of the theater Ivan Fedorovich Gorbunov.

The A.A.Bakhrushin Theater Museum also expanded his collection with a portrait of the ballerina of the Mariinsky Theater L.P. Barash, the work of N.I. Kravchenko.

As for the Musical Museum in St. Petersburg, there was purchased Kravchenko's portrait of the great Russian balalaika virtuoso and composer V.V. Andreev.

There is a portrait of A.P. Chekhov in the collection of Chekhov's museum, the work of Kravchenko.

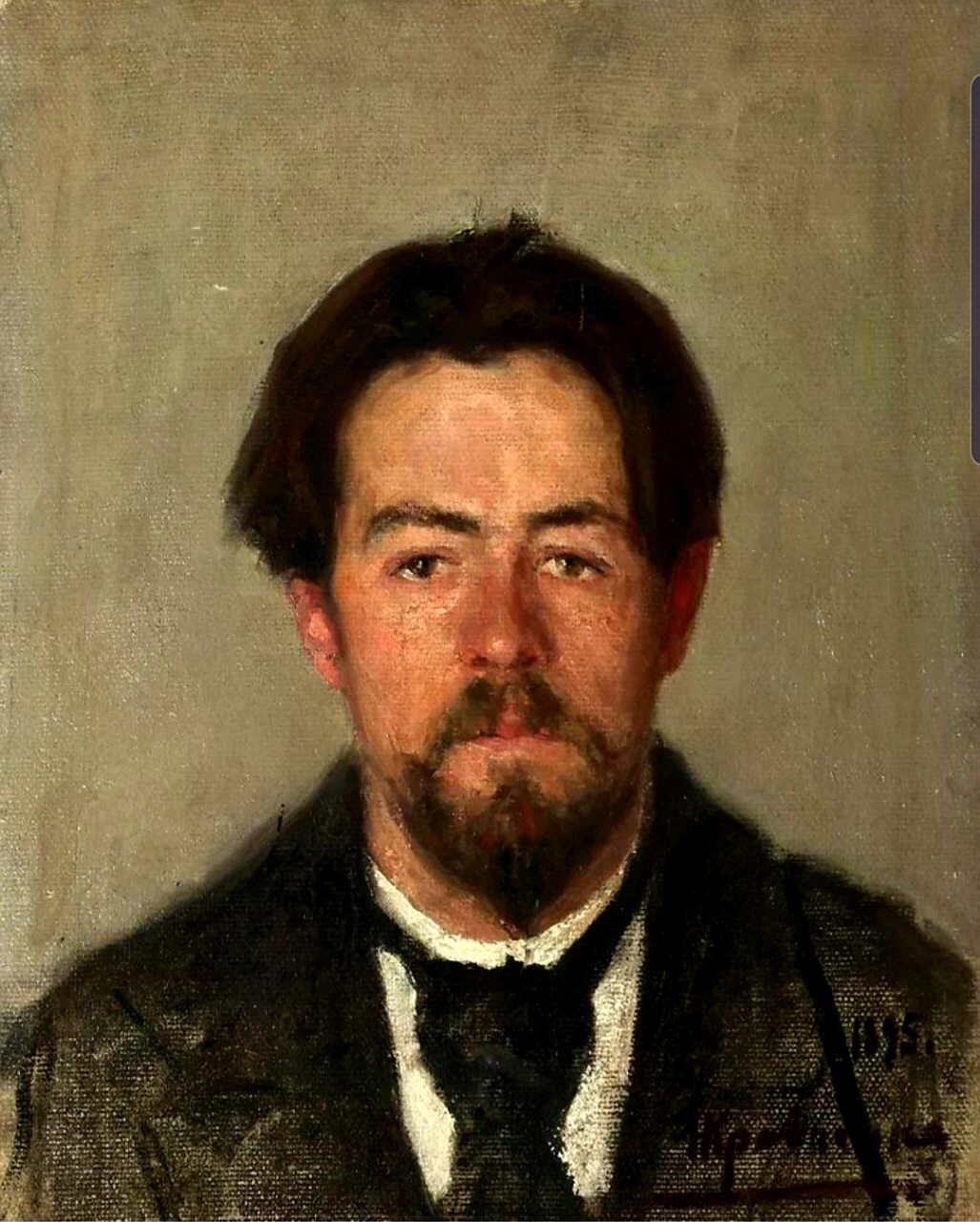
A.P.Chekhov.Artist N.I.Kravchenko

The Odessa's Museum of the Society of Fine Arts has expanded its collection with a watercolor portrait of the artist, engraver, academician of the Imperial Academy of Arts V.V.Mate, drawn by N.I. Kravchenko. In 1912, Kravchenko drew the painting "India.Morning" (tempera, size 41.6 cm by 67.9 cm). Also in 1912, the painting "Horses at the Mill" was painted (canvas, oil, size 71 cm by 83 cm). These paintings are still situated in the State Tretyakov Gallery in Moscow.

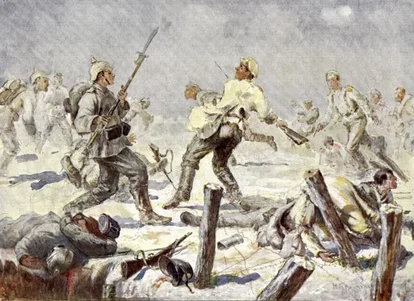
Duel. The painting is dedicated to the memory of the 16th company of the Wilmanstrand regiment near Skerniewice.

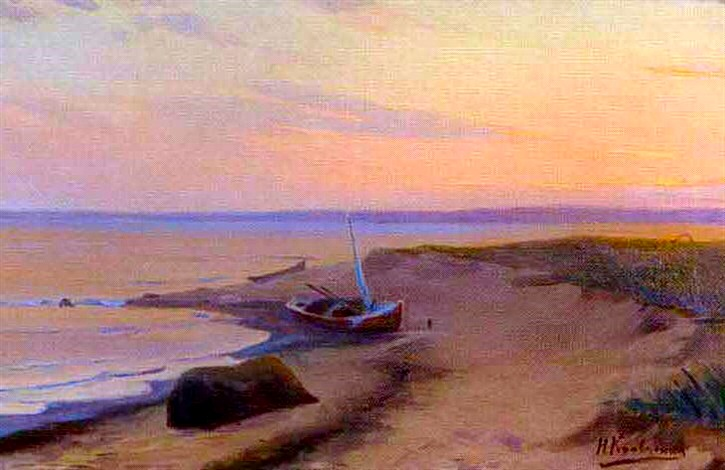
Boat on the beach.Artist N.I.Kravchenko

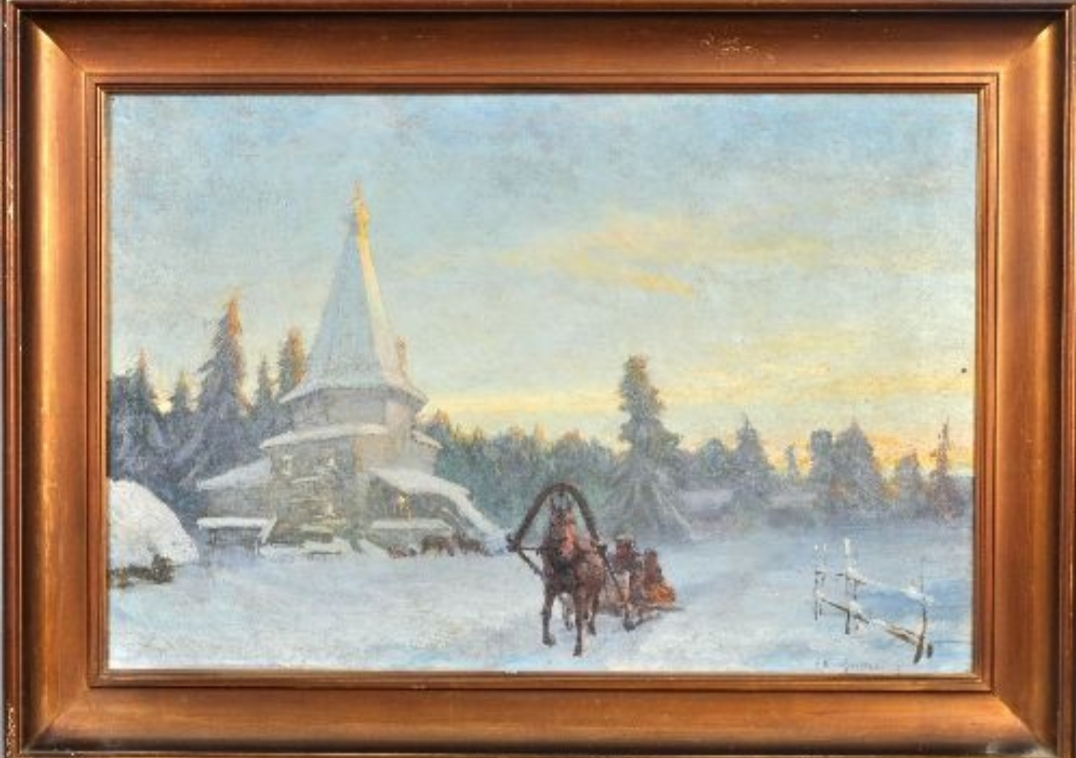
N.I.Kravchenko "winter landscape"

In 1913, Kravchenko finished the huge painting "The Taking of Beijing" by the order of the king. Kravchenko's pen drawings from life (Oryol, Bison, Olenebyk, Doe, Serna) from the nursery of F. F. Falz-Fein Askania-Nova were published in 1917 in the famous magazine "Capital and Manor". In 1918 by the order of the Soviet government, he wrote a large poster "Defense of the Revolution". In 1920 he painted for Herzen's house "The Oath of Herzen and Ogarev on the Sparrow Hills" and "Herzen at the London Printing House".

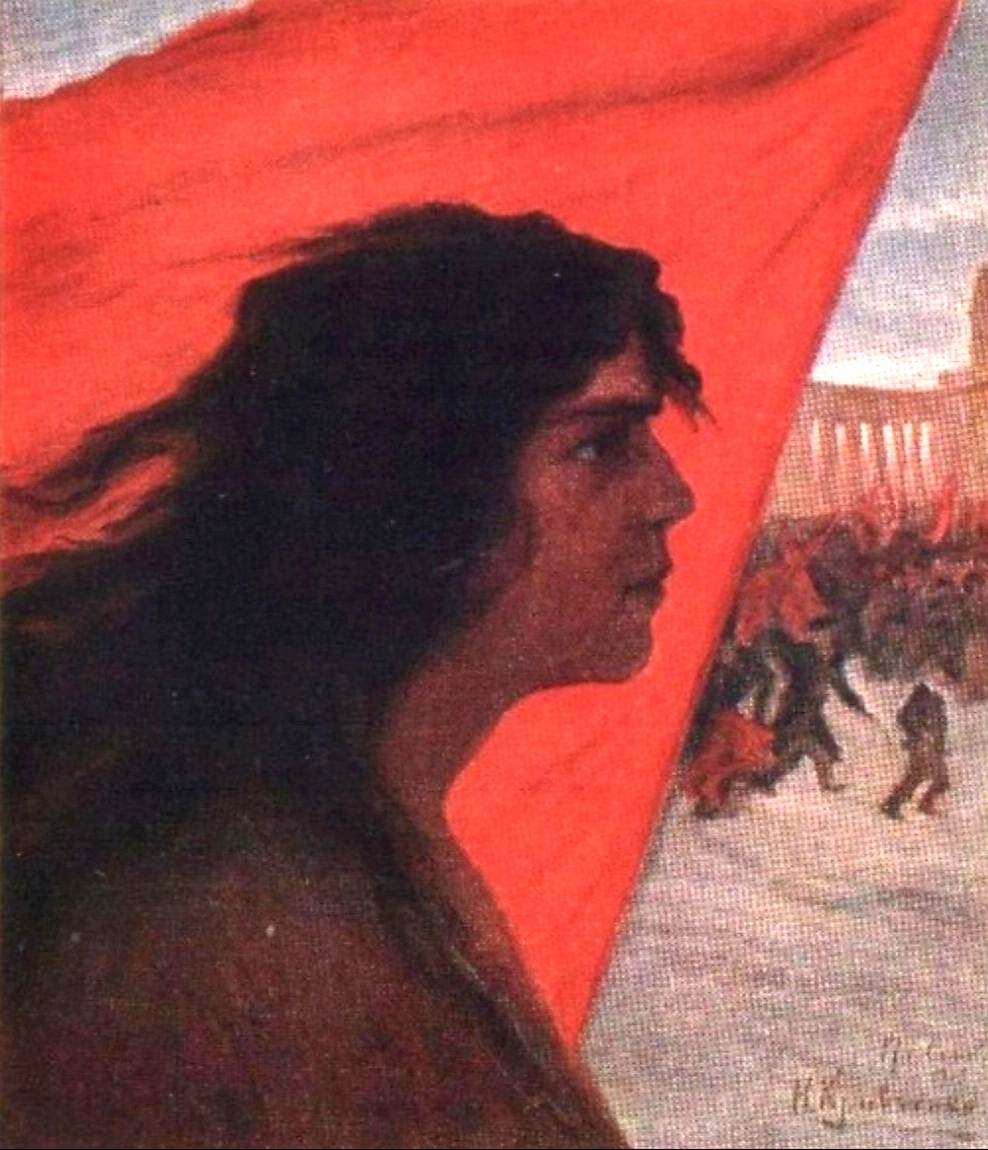
N.Kravchenko. Painting "The revolution is coming"

In the same period he painted life-size paintings "People's Commissar A. V. Lunacharsky" and "Lenin on the Kshessinska balcony". The painting by N. Kravchenko "Training Boxers Shooting" that was written in 1930 is situated in the Russian Museum of St. Petersburg. The picture is large, oil on canvas, 133 by 159 cm.

He collaborated with News – the official press organ of the Supreme Soviet of the USSR. M. Singer wrote about Kravchenko: "Nicolai Ivanovich Kravchenko has a wonderful schedule, whose pencil portraits were strikingly similar to the original. He was a well-known artist who responded to any topic, easy-going on any trip around the country where a pencil or pen was required".

He died in Leningrad on November 22, 1941. A large family of Russian battle painter, journalist and writer Nikolai Ivanovich Kravchenko lived in Leningrad before the war. Son Nikolai served as an architect, daughter Elena was a senior typist, and daughter Zinaida was an actress. There were also four grandchildren. Only two family members survived the Leningrad blockade in the winter of 1941 – the grandchildren Galina and Nikolai.

Kravchenko's paintings are situated in the State Russian Museum, in the State Tretyakov Gallery, in the Central Naval Museum, in the Chekhov Museum (Moscow), in museums of England, Belgium and many other countries.

=== Exhibitions ===
The artist executed a series of paintings based on these drawings and sketches and in 1904 he arranged their exhibition in St. Petersburg, in 1905 – at the World Exhibition in Liège, in 1906 – in Moscow, and in 1910 – in London. At the World Exhibition in Liège, the artist was assigned a separate room in the art section. The watercolor "Chinese Watchtower" was bought by the Belgian Museum in Antwerp.
