= Louis Soutter =

Swiss painter

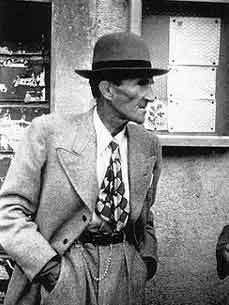
Louis Soutter (1930s)

Louis Adolphe Soutter (4 June 1871 – 20 February 1942) was a Swiss painter and graphic artist in the Art Brut style, who produced most of his work while under care in a hospice. He also worked as a musician, playing the violin.

== Biography ==
Soutter was born in Morges. His father was a pharmacist and his mother was a singing teacher at a women's academy. His brother, Albert, and sister, Jeanne-Louise became musicians. The architect, Le Corbusier, was a cousin on his mother's side.

He initially studied engineering at the University of Lausanne, then left to study architecture in Geneva with Louis Viollier (1852–1931). The musical atmosphere of his home eventually had its influence, however and, in 1892, he decided on a career in music. Accordingly, he moved to Brussels where he became a student of the violinist, Eugène Ysaÿe, at the Royal Conservatory. While there, he became enamored of one of Ysaÿe's other students; a young American named Madge Fursman (1870–1965). Shortly after, they became engaged.

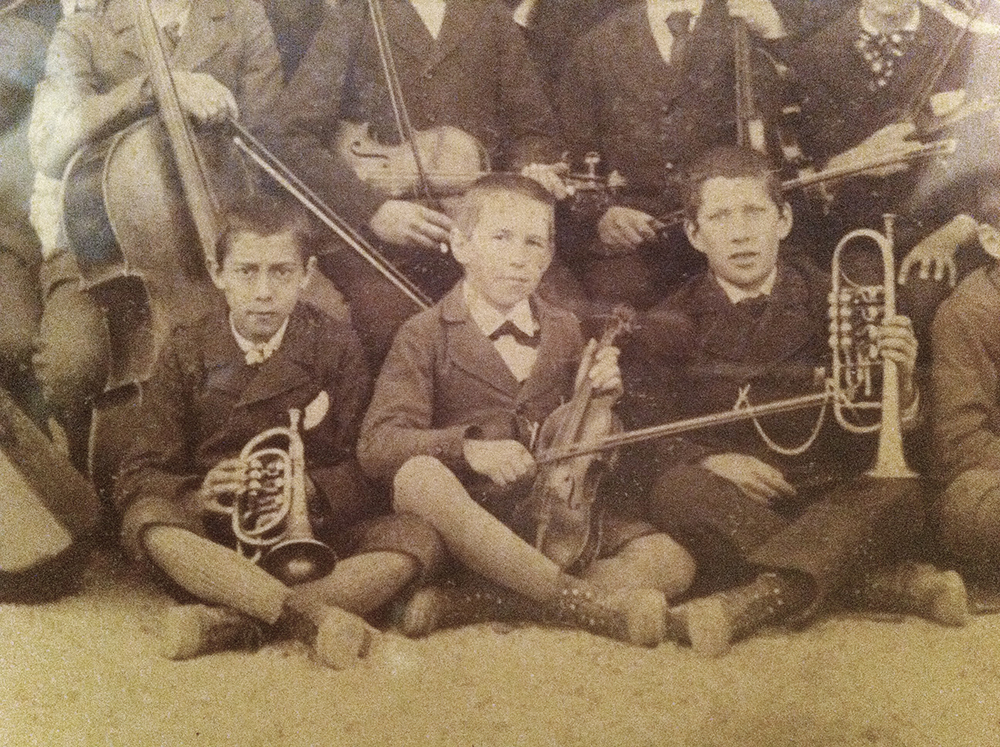
Soutter and his violin (1883)

In 1895, he suddenly interrupted his musical studies, returned to Lausanne, and began to study painting. Later, he worked in Geneva in the studios of the landscape painter Léon Gaud (1844–1908). After that, he went to Paris and took positions in the studios of Jean-Paul Laurens and Jean-Joseph Benjamin-Constant at the Académie Colarossi. He also met Artus van Briggle, a ceramicist from America, who was planning to start a business in Colorado Springs, where Fursman was from. Van Briggle told Soutter about a new college there, with a fine arts program, and suggested there might be an opportunity to create a department of painting and drawing.

=== In Colorado Springs ===
He left for the United States at the beginning of 1897. Originally he had planned to open an interior architecture studio in New York, but health problems proved to be an obstacle. He spent the next three months in Chicago, happily planning his next move. He went on to Colorado Springs, where he married Madge in July 1897. For a time, they lived with her parents, then found an apartment at a residential hotel.

He opened a studio and, by 1898, was head of the Fine Arts Department at Colorado College. He would often take his students into the countryside to paint. The next few years passed uneventfully; then, in 1903, Madge sued for divorce; charging physical and mental cruelty, which may have simply been made up, due to the strict divorce laws at the time. She did not ask for support of any kind. He did not contest her action, resigned from the College and, according to The Gazette-Telegraph, had left for Paris with no intention of returning. He was succeeded at the College by Van Briggle, who had by then established his pottery manufactory. Madge remarried in 1907.

He did spend several months in Paris, then went to Morges, where his physical and mental health declined. He would often complain about Madge to his friends and relatives, claiming that she was authoritarian and exploitative. In 1906, a friend of one of his uncles, who was head of the Sonnenfels Clinic in Spiez, invited him there to work as the gardener.

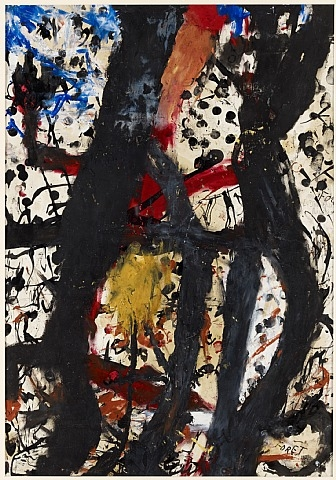
Forest

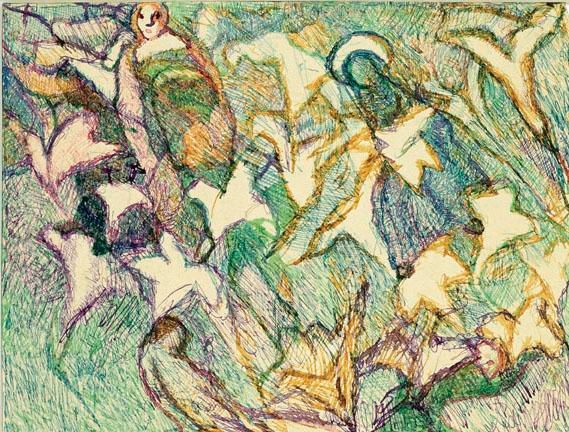
The Lilies and the Foolish Virgins

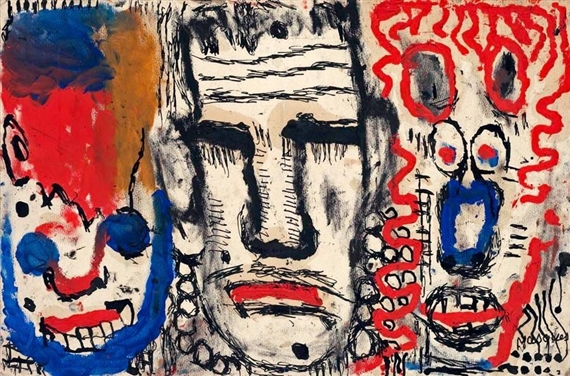
Masks

=== Musical career and institutionalization ===
By 1907, he was feeling sufficiently improved to embark on a musical career. He obtained a position in the first violin section of the Orchestre du Théâtre de Genève (now the Orchestre de la Suisse Romande), but left after an "artistic disagreement". The following year, he was engaged by the Orchestre Symphonique de Lausanne and, in 1915, by the Orchestre de Genève. Problems persisted, however, and by 1918 he was playing in small ensembles at tea rooms and tourist resorts. During this time, he gained a reputation for "madness" and was always melancholy. He was in several groups throughout Switzerland until 1922, when he went back to Morges to stay. There, he lived off his brother, who had to support the habit for wearing fancy clothes he had picked up in America, and his drinking. Eventually, he was placed under guardianship and sent to a nursing home in Gros-de-Vaud.

In 1923, at the age of fifty-two, he was placed in what would now be called a hospice, for elderly men, in Ballaigues. He was not confined there, and often went for long walks in the countryside or to visit his relatives. Despite this freedom, he was unhappy there and generally disliked. He remained there until his death.

During the early part of his stay there, he made sketches with pen and pencil in small school notebooks and practiced music in the chapel; sometimes giving lessons. His cousin, Le Corbusier, who had discovered him there in 1927, was impressed with what he saw and helped him acquire better materials for his artwork. By 1937, his hands were crippled with osteoarthritis and he began to use his fingers; dipping them directly into the ink or paint. Meanwhile, Le Corbusier was gathering his works. Through his efforts, exhibitions were held in Hartford (1936), Lausanne (1937) and New York (1939). Soutter's new-found approach, applying ink directly to paper with his fingers, eventually led Le Corbusier to shun the artist, being 'the antithesis to Le Corbusier's architectural emphasis on order.'

Soutter died in Ballaigues in 1942, weakened by his repeated refusal to eat, at the age of seventy-one, and was buried by the hospice. His friends and family only learned of his death by reading the obituary in the newspaper.

Hermann Hesse wrote a poem about him. In 2008, a square was named after him in his hometown.
