= Zofia Albinowska-Minkiewiczowa =

Polish and Ukrainian artist (1886–1971)

- Софія Альбіновська-Мінкевич
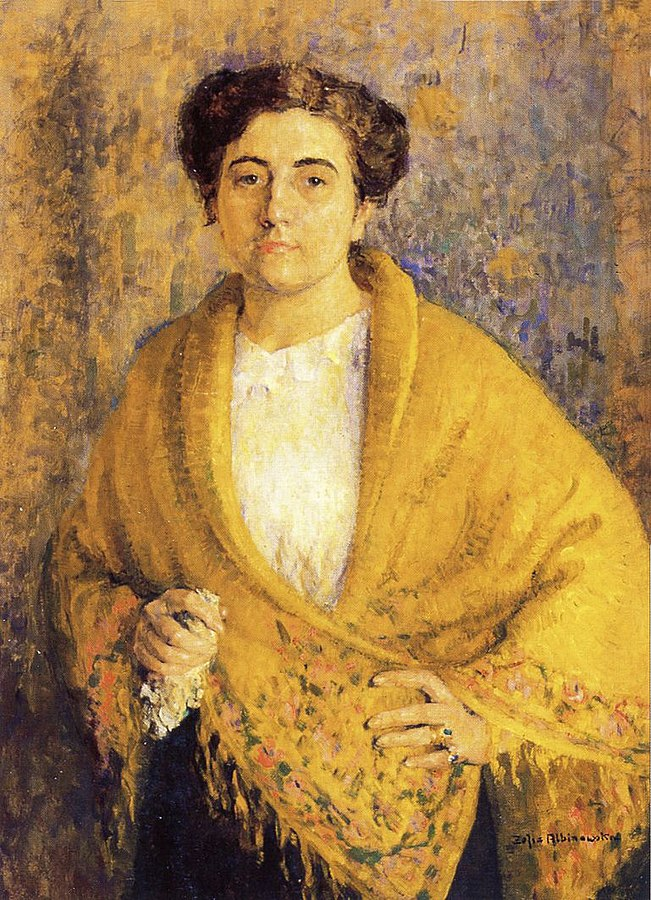
- Self-portrait from 1913
- Born: Zofia Albinowska; 16 November 1886; Klagenfurt, Duchy of Carinthia, Austria-Hungary
- Died: 30 June 1971 (aged 84); Lviv, Ukrainian SSR, Soviet Union
- Resting place: Lychakiv Cemetery
- Education: Beaux-Arts de Paris, 1909; Vienna School of Arts and Crafts, 1912; Lviv Polytechnic; University of Lviv
- Spouse: Witold Minkiewicz (m. 1922; died 1961)
- Awards: Cross of Merit; 1939

Zofia Yulianivna Albinowska-Minkiewiczowa (née Albinowska; Ukrainian: Софія Юліанівна Альбіновська-Мінкевич; 16 November 1886 – 30 June 1971) was a Polish painter and graphic designer active in Lviv. From 1917 to 1939, Albinowska-Minkiewiczowa served as the president of the Association of Polish Artists and Designers in Lviv.

== Early life and education ==
Albinowska-Minkiewiczowa was born Zofia Albinowska on 16 November 1886 in Klagenfurt, Duchy of Carinthia (present-day Austria) to Bronisława Albinowska (née Liskowackich; 1863–1953), a writer, and Juliusz Albinowski, a divisional general.

Settling in Vienna in 1901, Albinowska-Minkiewiczowa first studied at the studio of Heinrich Strehblow and later under Franz Hohenberg and Ferdinand Kruis from 1902 to 1906. From 1906 to 1909, Albinowska-Minkiewiczowa lived in Paris where she briefly attended the Académie Colarossi before studying graphics at the Beaux-Arts de Paris. During this period Albinowska-Minkiewiczowa travelled to England, Belgium, Holland and Italy, and formed a close relationship with the Polish painter Olga Boznańska. Returning to Vienna in 1909, Albinowska-Minkiewiczowa continued her studies at the Vienna School of Arts and Crafts. In 1912, Albinowska-Minkiewiczowa settled in Lemberg, Austrian Galicia (present-day Lviv, Ukraine) where she studied mathematics simultaneously at Lviv Polytechnic and the University of Lviv.

== Career ==
From 1917 until the Soviet annexation of Lviv in 1939, Albinowska-Minkiewiczowa served as the president of the Association of Polish Artists and Designers in Lviv. Albinowska-Minkiewiczowa also served as the deputy director of the The Society of Friends of Fine Arts in Lviv from 1922 to 1939. Following Soviet annexation, Albinowska-Minkiewiczowa joined the Union of Soviet Artists of Ukraine.

Her early works are usually portraits, but after 1920 she painted mainly small compositions showing room interiors, still life and flowers. Her works are sometimes described as being painted in a post-impressionist manner. She participated in many domestic and international exhibitions, including in Prague, Paris, and New York. She refused to paint the Soviet commanders saying that she can paint only the flowers.

== Personal life ==
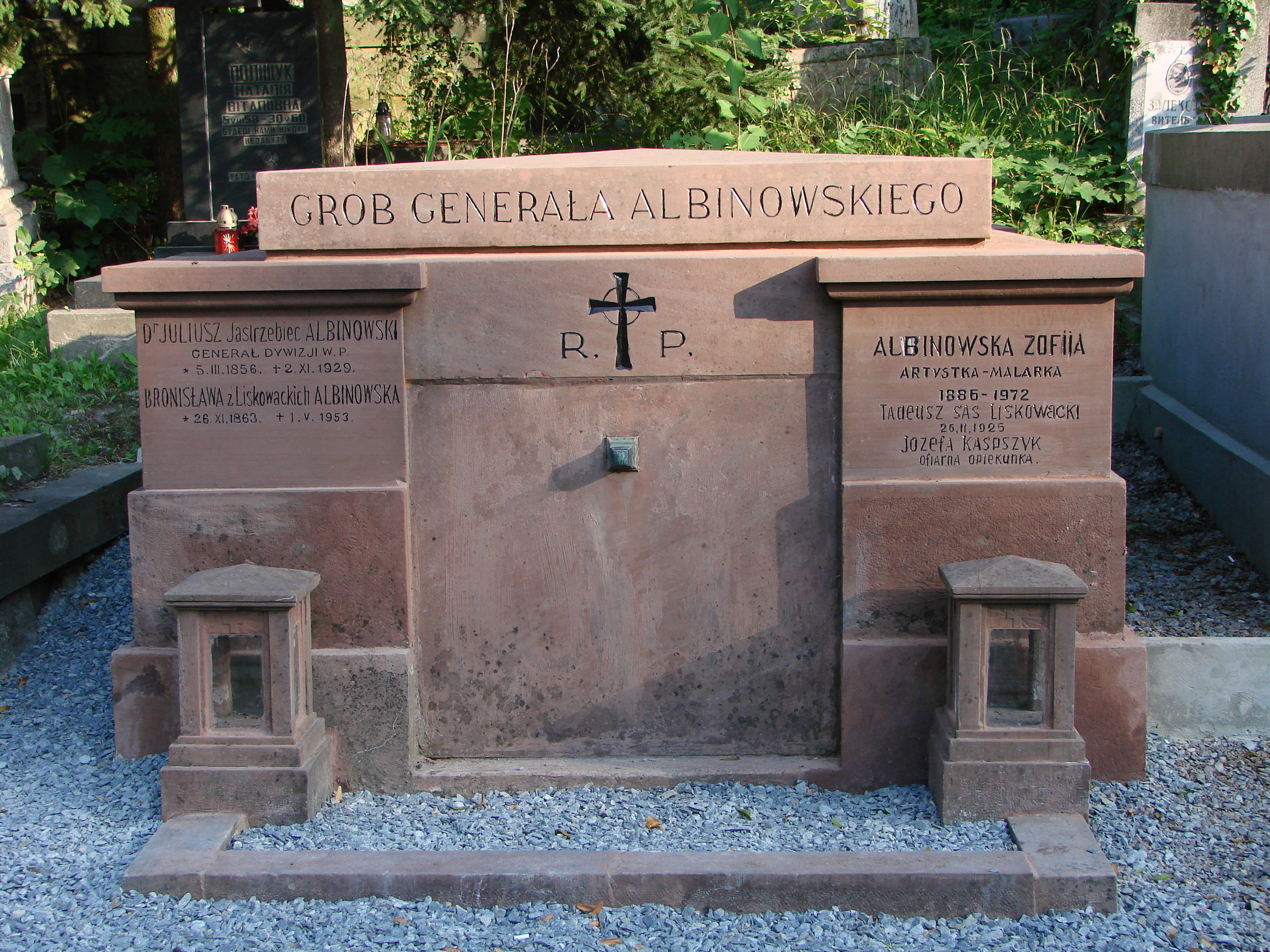
Albinowska-Minkiewiczowa's grave at Lychakiv Cemetery

In 1922, Albinowska-Minkiewiczowa married Witold Minkiewicz, an architect and professor at Lviv Polytechnic.

On 30 June 1971, Albinowska-Minkiewiczowa died in Lviv aged 84. Albinowska-Minkiewiczowa was buried at Lychakiv Cemetery.

== Selected paintings ==
- Kwiaty na oknie (Flowers in the Window), 1912
- Kwiaty w dwóch wazonach (Flowers in Two Vases)
- Bukiet kwiatów (Bouquet of Flowers)
- Bukiet róż z winogronami (Rose Bouquet With Grapes)
- Martwa natura z kwiatami (Still Life With Flowers)
- Wnętrze saloniku (Parlor Interior)
- Martwa natura (Still Life)
- Róże (Roses)
- Martwa natura z hiacyntem i porcelanowym wschodnim talerzem (Still Life With Hyacinth and Porcelain Eastern Plate)
