= Mary Jett Franklin =

Painter of Athens, Georgia

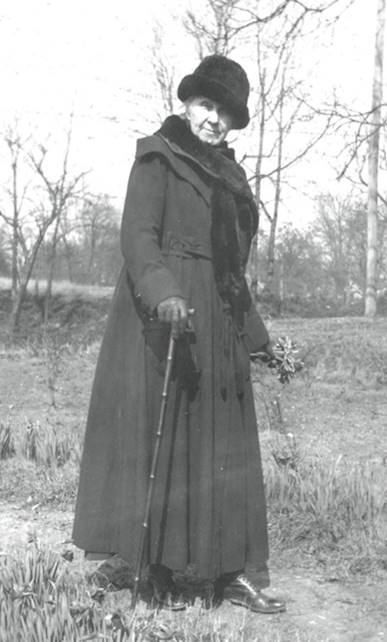
Photo of Miss Mary Jett Franklin, ca. 1921, taken at Moss Side, Athens, Georgia, by Sarah Hunter Moss

Mary Jett Franklin (1842–1928) was an American genre and portrait artist who attended the Pennsylvania Academy of the Fine Arts (PAFA) in Philadelphia, Pennsylvania. She traveled to Paris in 1889 to continue her art education at the Académie Colarossi, one of the few art schools to accept female students at that time.

Franklin was born in 1842 in Athens, Georgia, and died there in 1928, where she is buried in Oconee Hill Cemetery. She never married and supported herself by selling her paintings and doing commissioned portraits.

One of Franklin's early paintings, The Page, sold for $600 at the National Academy 56th annual exhibition in New York City in April 1881. A full-length painting of a laughing young girl dressed in a page costume, this painting, like many others of Franklin's, has been lost. Numerous newspapers around the country carried the article about the sale of this work. The Atlanta Constitution wrote:

Georgians will be proud to know that among this number [of artists exhibiting] is a Georgia lady. Miss Mary Franklin, formerly of Macon [actually she was from Athens, Georgia]. She has a neat studio in the Sherwood building and is meeting with deserved success. Her "Page" exhibited in the academy has been sold for $600. It represents a girlish-looking boy, attired in a greenish-brown suit, with his hands clasped around one knee. The background is harmoniously treated in a darker color and reveals a handsome figure. This painting is celebrated for its vigorous treatment and is an unusual production for a lady artist.

Early in her career, Franklin even created sculptures and engravings. In 1871 she was contracted to create a plaster bust of the late Episcopal Bishop Stephen Elliott, which was pronounced to be very lifelike.

Some of her engravings of life in the South were published in Cotton and Its Kingdom by Henry Woodfin Grady and in the October 1881 issue of Harper's Monthly.

Franklin's paintings were exhibited in the PAFA annual exhibitions in Philadelphia, the National Academy exhibitions in New York City, and in numerous exhibitions in Paris, including the Salon de Champs de Mars, the Salon of American Women Artists, the National Exposition de Montélimar (1902), and the Societé des Artistes Indépendants.

From about 1899 until she returned to Athens in 1914 with the outbreak of World War I, Franklin spent summers in Tunis and Carthage in North Africa, collecting sketches and studies to create large canvases when she returned to her studio on the boulevard de Montparnasse in Paris.

Five of her Tunisian paintings are now part of the collection at the Georgia Museum of Art in her hometown of Athens, Georgia. Some of her other works may be in private collections around Georgia, the U.S.A., and France, but many of them were probably sold in Europe and their location in the 21st century is unknown.

In 1924, Franklin finally returned to her hometown of Athens, Georgia, where she spent the remainder of her life. She kept busy in a studio in Peabody Hall on the University of Georgia campus. She frequently taught art classes for the students at Lucy Cobb Institute as well as the University of Georgia. She prepared programs about life in Paris and plein air painting for the fledgling Athens Art Association and the University Women's Club, often displaying her latest paintings for the enjoyment of the group. She was a popular speaker around the state: as one friend stated, "She was such a famous wit that if you wanted a story to go over well, you only had to begin it with 'Miss Mary Franklin said ...' and go on from there."

A biography of Mary Jett Franklin was published in the Athens Historian, vol. 17 (2017). The genealogist Mary Bondurant Warren (1930–2021) presented a program about Franklin for the Athens Historical Society at the Georgia Museum of Art in Athens, Georgia, on Sunday, 28 August 2016.

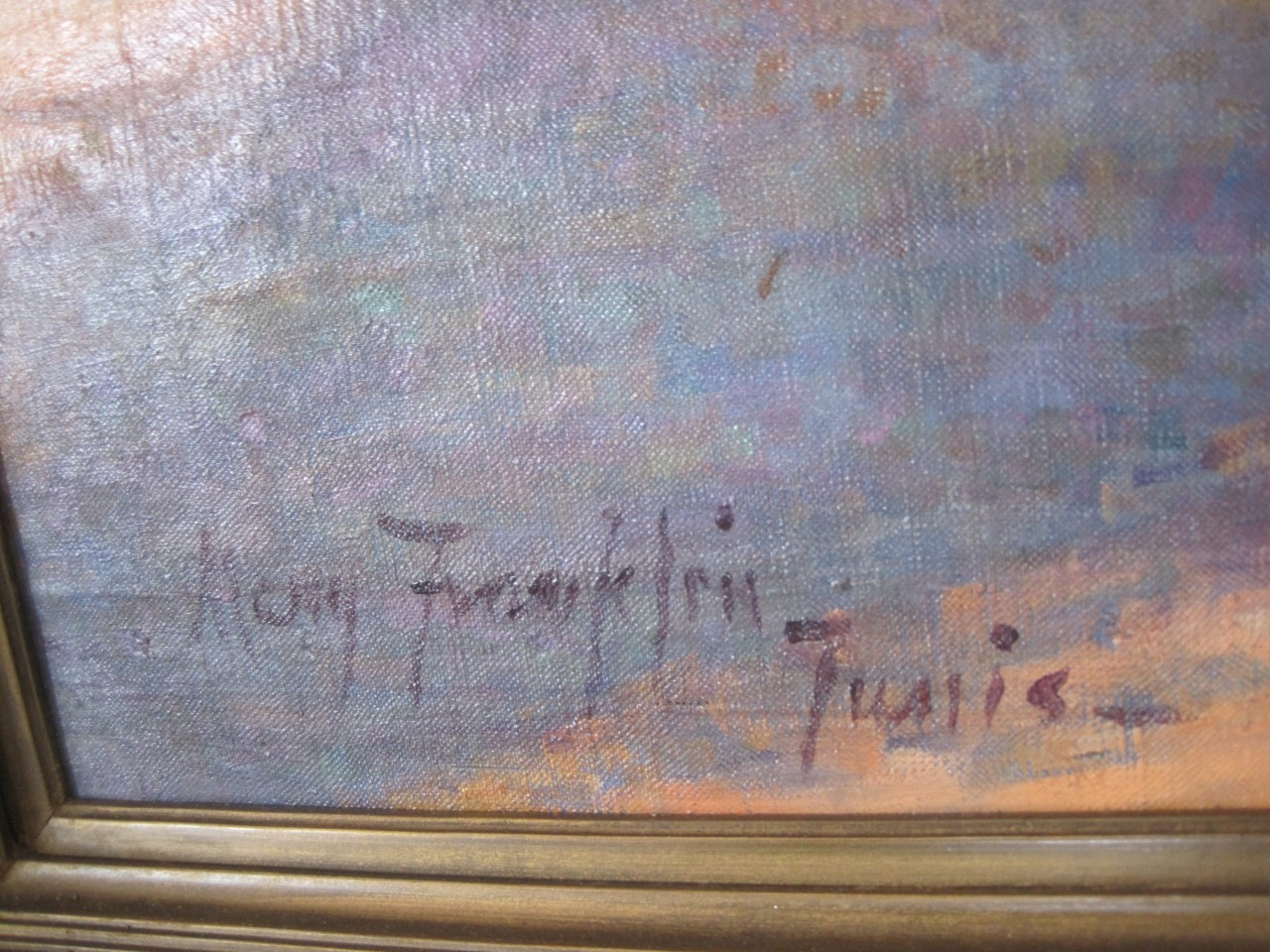
Signature of Mary Jett Franklin from La Nomade

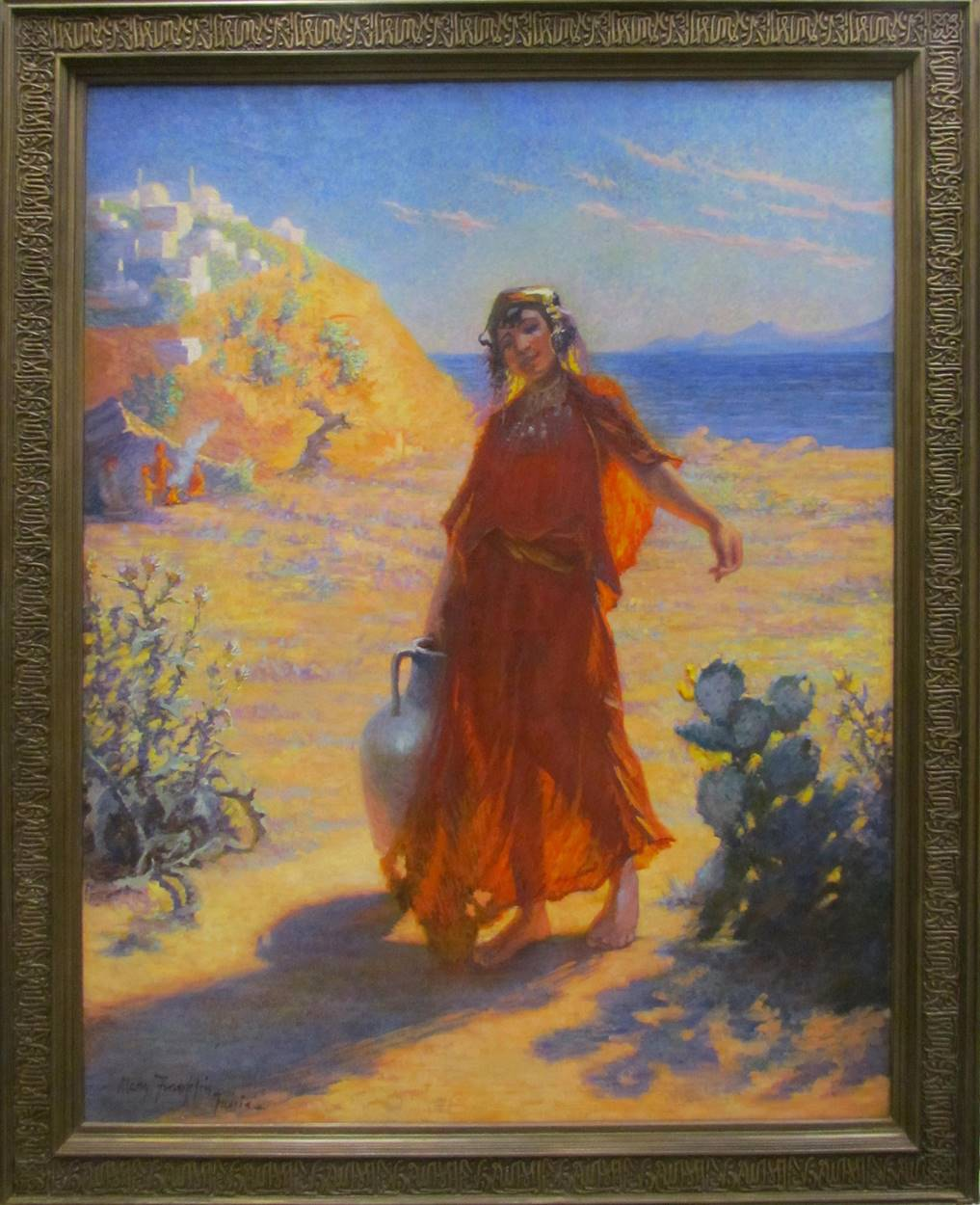
A young Tunisian woman in a red garment carries water in a jug to her home. Painted about 1913 by Mary Jett Franklin, who gave this painting to the Women's Building, University of Georgia, in 1923.

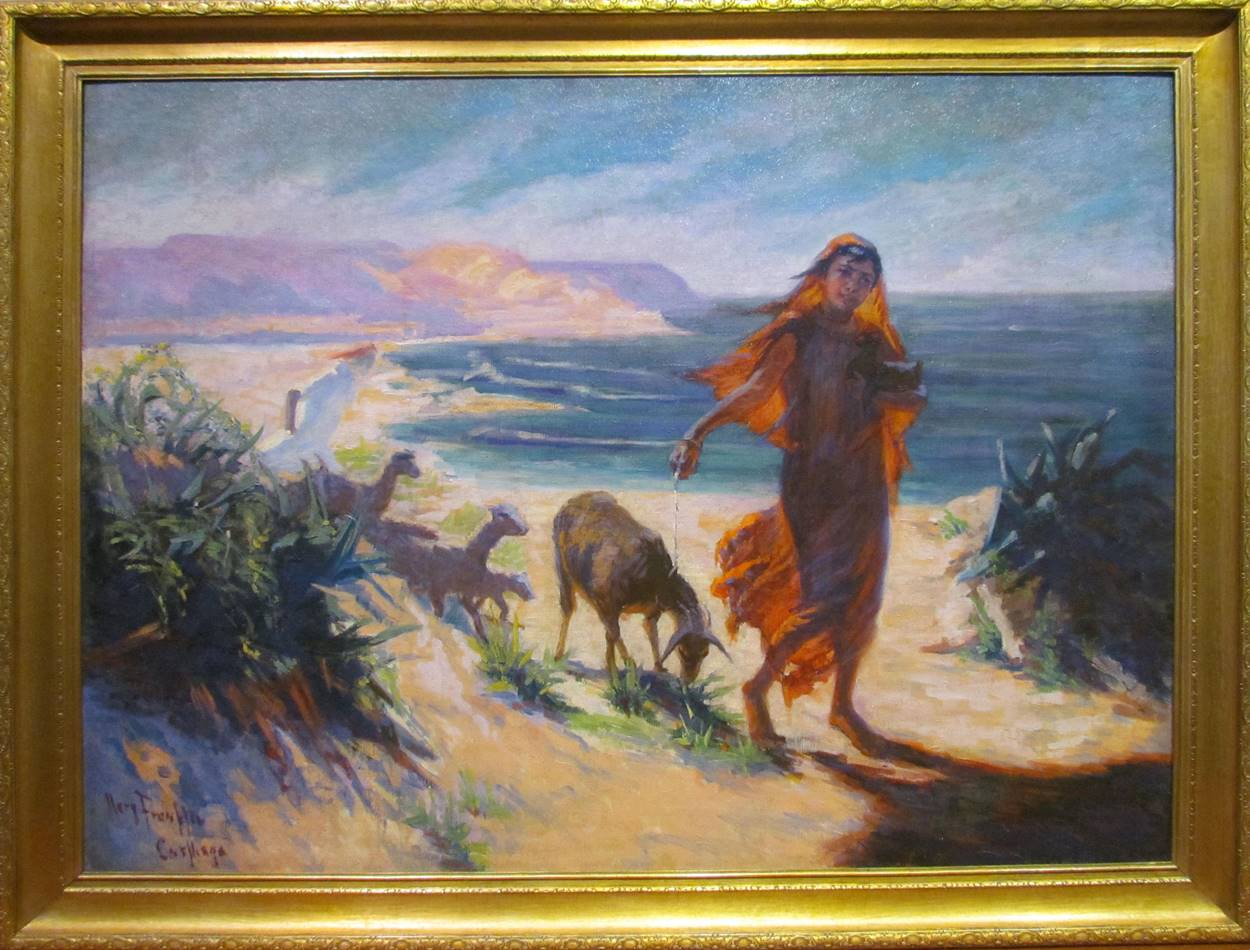
A young woman in a red garment is leading her goats back home. Painted by Mary Jett Franklin at Carthage, North Africa, about 1913, it was given by her to the Women's Building, University of Georgia, in 1921. Now in the Georgia Museum of Art, Athens, Georgia.
