= Ethel Blanchard Collver =

American artist

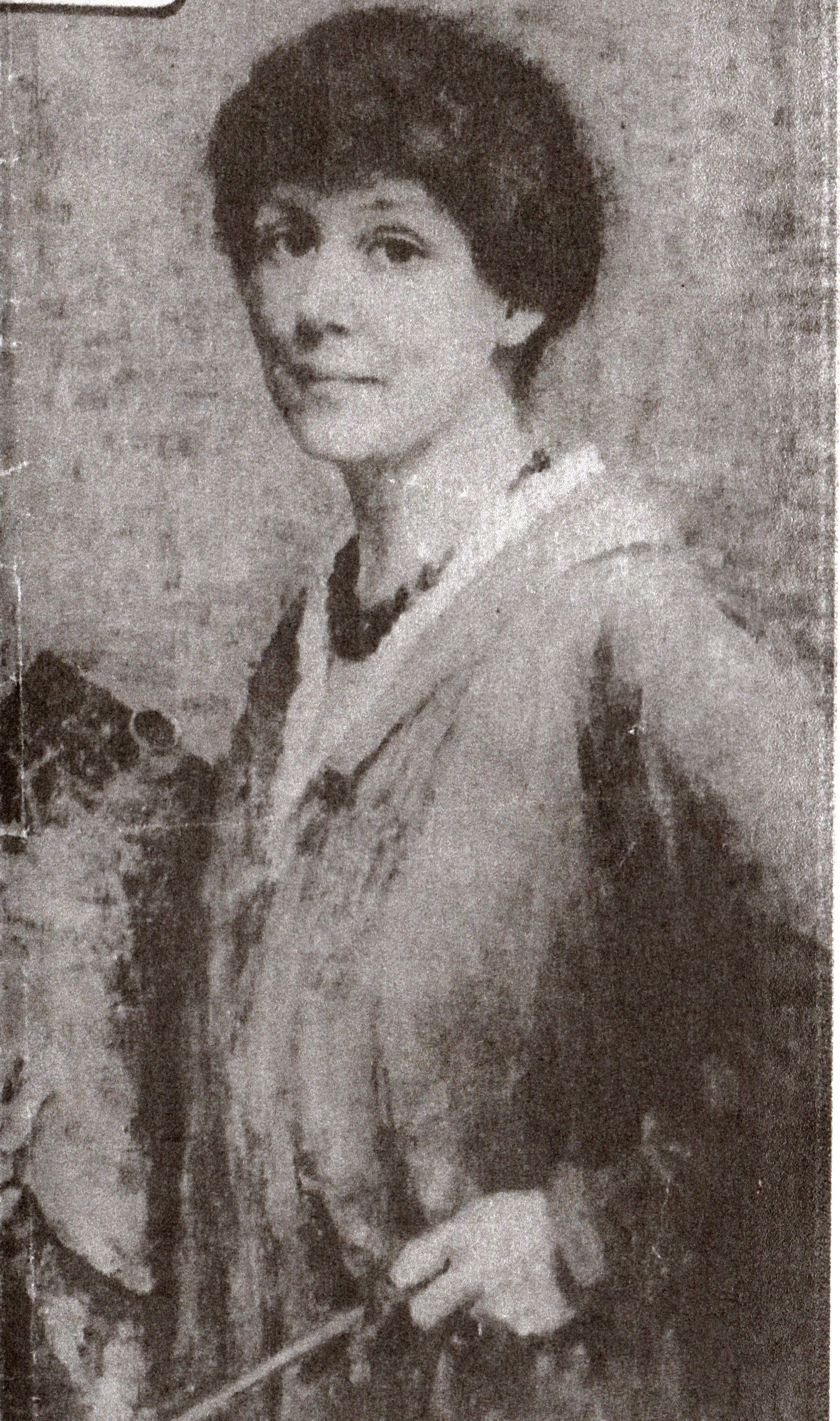
- Born: 1875; Boston, Massachusetts, U.S.
- Died: 1955 (aged 79–80)
- Education: Académie Colarossi
- Known for: Painting
- Movement: Impressionism

Ethel Blanchard Collver (1875 - November 10, 1955) was an American Impressionist artist and teacher who was best known for her portraits of children, scenes of daily life, and landscapes.

== Biography ==
Born and raised in Boston, Ethel Blanchard Collver studied at the Museum of Fine Arts, Boston. Her early work was influenced by teachers at the school; Frank W. Benson, Edmund C. Tarbel and Philip L. Hale. After graduation she studied briefly with Charles Hawthorne. Her subject matter included children's portraits, scenes of daily life, and landscapes. She used a variety of mediums which included oils on canvas, miniatures on shell, drawings in pencil and charcoal, water colors, and etchings.

By 1904 Collver began specializing in miniatures and portrait paintings, becoming a prolific and recognized portrait painter of children. Although continuing portrait work throughout her career, she broadened her artwork interests while spending a year (1919 - 1920) in Paris at the Académie Colarossi as a pupil of Charles Guerino, Bernard Naudin, and Henri Morrissey. While studying in Paris her specialties expanded to include daily life scenes and landscapes. In 1932 she returned to Paris to study with Audre L'Hote and Amédée Ozenfant.

She married the travel writer Leon L. Collver in 1906 and together they began traveling the world. In addition to portrait painting, Collver's work reflects her experiences in Japan, France, Italy, Spain, Greece, England, the Dalmatian Coast, Jerusalem, Algiers, Cairo, Jamaica and the West Indies. When she was not traveling abroad, she lived in several U.S. cities in Connecticut, Massachusetts, New York, and Florida. As with her foreign paintings, her domestic daily life paintings reflect those East Coast locations. Whether foreign or domestic, the subject matter of her daily life scenes focused especially on children and women at parks and gardens, at the beach and at marketplaces.'

As a recognized minor artist Collver presented lectures and taught art workshops in Boston, New York, Greenwich and Ft. Lauderdale. Also, she organized and led a two-month traveling art workshop to Paris.

== Recognition ==
While studying in Paris in 1920, Collver's oil painting titled "February in the Luxembourg" was selected for exhibition at the Spring Salon of the Societe Nationale des Beaux Artes. Her work has been exhibited in several museums and galleries on the East Coast including the Corcoran Gallery of Art in Washington D.C., the Museum of Fine Arts in Boston, the National Academy of Design in New York, the Pennsylvania Academy of Fine Arts in Philadelphia, the Copley Society of Boston, Doll and Richards in Boston, the Allbright Museum in Buffalo, and in Chicago at the American Art Today exhibition at the World's Fair 1939.

In 1934 the National Association of Women Painters and Sculptors awarded Collver the Olive Nobel Prize for Decorative Painting for her oil painting entitled "Manhattan Patterns".
