= Challis Walker =

American sculptor

Challis Walker Calandria
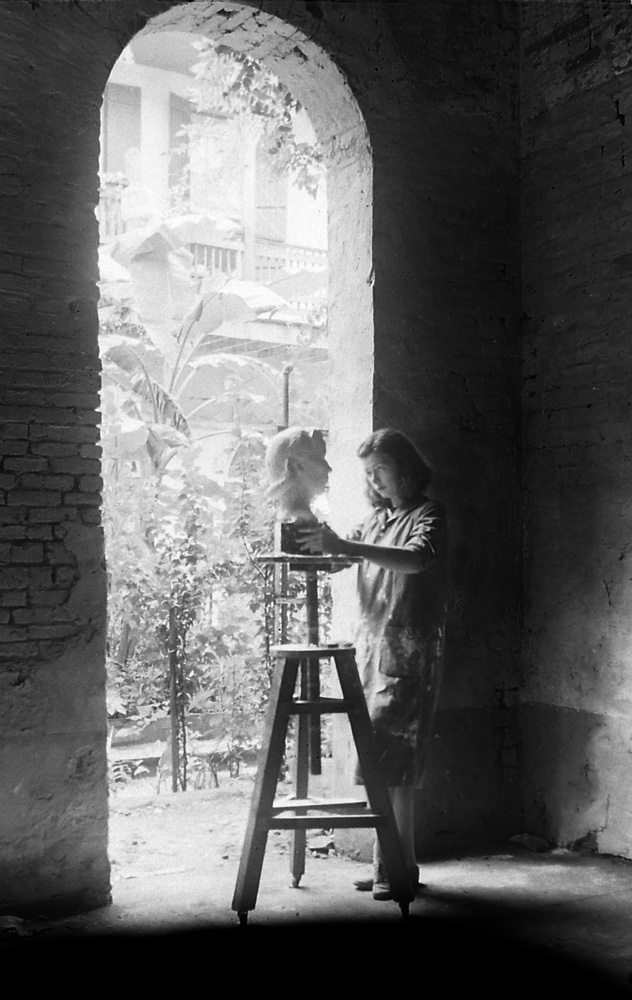
- Challis Walker Calandria in 1942
- Born: Challis Walker; November 18, 1912; New York, New York
- Died: February 12, 2000 (aged 87); New Orleans, Louisiana
- Education: Art Students League of New York, Académie Colarossi
- Known for: Sculpture Painting
- Spouse: Juan José Calandria (m. 1941)

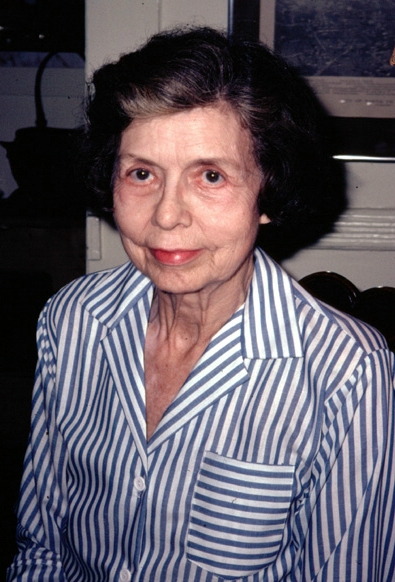
Challis Walker Calandria - 1985

Challis Walker Calandria (November 18, 1912 – February 12, 2000) was an American sculptor and painter.

== Biography ==
Challis Walker, born in New York City. Calandria was educated in New York City. At the age of twelve she had her first instruction in sculpture (outside of school) which caused her decision to enter art school after graduating from the Chapin School.

In juried shows she received many honors from the museums of New Orleans.
