= Libertarianism Today =

2010 book by Jacob H. Huebert

- Cover
- Author: Jacob H. Huebert
- Language: English
- Subject: Libertarianism
- Publisher: Praeger
- Publication date: 2010
- Publication place: United States
- Media type: Print
- ISBN: 978-0-313-37754-9

Libertarianism Today is a 2010 book about the modern libertarian movement by Jacob H. Huebert. The work, which received generally positive reviews, has been described as a successor book to Murray Rothbard's For a New Liberty (1973).

== Reception ==
The book has received generally positive reviews from David Gordon, Walter Block, and Stephan Kinsella, among others.
