= Democracy: The God That Failed =

2001 book by Hans-Hermann Hoppe

- Cover of the first edition
- Author: Hans-Hermann Hoppe
- Language: English
- Subject: Political philosophy Criticism of democracy
- Genre: Essay collection
- Publisher: Transaction Publishers
- Publication date: 2001
- Publication place: New Brunswick, NJ
- Media type: Print (hardcover and paperback)
- Pages: 304
- ISBN: 978-0765808684

Democracy: The God That Failed is a 2001 book by Hans-Hermann Hoppe containing thirteen essays on democracy. Passages in the book oppose universal suffrage and favor "natural elites". The book helped popularize Hoppe in far-right discourse.

Hoppe is a German-born economist who was a professor at University of Nevada, Las Vegas. Until 2026, he was associated with the Mises Institute, a right-libertarian think tank.

== Summary ==
In the book, Hoppe argues that democracy is a cause of civilizational decline. The book "examines modern democracies in the light of various evident failures" which, in Hoppe's view, include rising unemployment rates, expanding public debt, and insolvent social security systems. He attributes democracy's failures to pressure groups seeking increased government expenditures, regulations and taxation and a lack of counter-measures to them. Potential solutions he discusses include secession, "shifting of control over the nationalised wealth from a larger, central government to a smaller, regional one" and "complete freedom of contract, occupation, trade and migration introduced".

Hoppe characterizes democracy as "publicly-owned government", and when he compares it with monarchy—"privately-owned government"—he concludes that the latter is preferable; however, Hoppe aims to show that both monarchy and democracy are deficient systems compared to his preferred structure for advancing civilization—something he calls the natural order, a system free of both taxation and coercive monopoly in which jurisdictions freely compete for adherents. In his Introduction, he lists other names used elsewhere to refer to this concept of "natural order", including "ordered anarchy", "private property anarchism", "anarcho-capitalism", "autogovernment", "private law society", and "pure capitalism".

The title of the work is an allusion to The God that Failed, a 1949 work in which six authors who formerly held communist views describe their experience of, and subsequent disillusion with, communism.

== Reception ==
The book helped popularize Hoppe in the far-right discourse, particularly a section of the book that called for expulsion of political rivals.

Asked by The Intercept in 2021 about his incorporation into far-right internet memes celebrating political violence, Hoppe responded that the question was ignorant, saying, "I have been an intellectual champion of private property right, free markets, freedom of contract and association, and peace", and, "What do I know? There are lots of crazy people out there!"

Walter Block, a colleague of Hoppe's at the Mises Institute, reviewed the book in The American Journal of Economics and Sociology and gave it a generally favorable review, writing, "This book will take by storm the field of political economy, and no one interested in these topics can afford to be without it."

In a 2017 perspective article in The Washington Post about libertarian connections with the alt-right, John Ganz wrote that Hoppe's book "cites specious scholarship on the IQ differences inherent in race to support his arguments, presents an 'anarcho-capitalist' defense of segregation as the prerogative of property owners, and is so unabashedly anti-egalitarian he doubts the basic humanity of people who don’t fit into his ideological schema."

Ava Kofman credits the book with pushing Curtis Yarvin away from standard libertarian thought and towards more monarchical ideas, contributing to the development of the Dark Enlightenment movement. Authoritarianism scholar Julian Waller noted "it's not copy-and-pasted [from Democracy], but it is such a direct influence that it's kind of obscene".

== Publishing history ==
- Transaction Publishers [New Brunswick, NJ] (2001)
  - Hardcover. ISBN 0765800888.
  - Paperback. ISBN 0765808684.
- Routledge (2017)
  - Audiobook edition.
  - Narrated by Paul Strikwerda.
  - Online at SoundCloud

== See also ==
- Criticism of democracy
- The Myth of the Rational Voter
