= Natural order (philosophy) =

Source from which natural law seeks to derive its authority

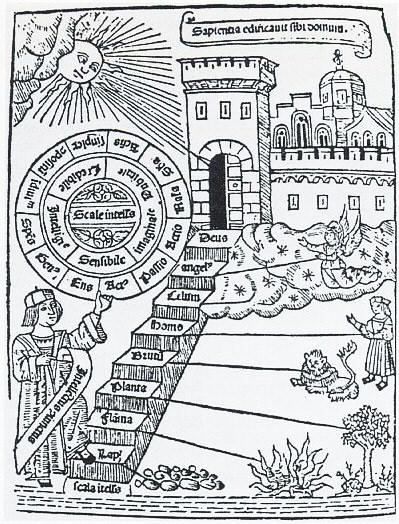
The mediaeval scala naturae as a staircase, implying the possibility of progress: Ramon Llull's Ladder of Ascent and Descent of the Mind, 1305

In philosophy, the natural order is the moral source from which natural law seeks to derive its authority. Natural order encompasses the natural relations of beings to one another in the absence of law, which natural law attempts to reinforce. In contrast, divine law seeks authority from God, and positive law seeks authority from government.

== History ==
The Ancient Greeks called order cosmos, which the Romans later translated as ordo (Latin "order, rank, class") . Ordo has mainly two meanings: discipline on the one hand, and science theory or philosophical on the other hand, reflecting on how to understand sequences and classes.

The Physiocrats, a group of 18th century Enlightenment French philosophers, thought there was a "natural order" that allowed human beings to live together. According to them it is an ideal order given to them by God, which allowed human beings to live together in an ideal society. The natural laws are the expression of the will of God. Men did not come together via a somewhat arbitrary "social contract." Rather, they had to discover the laws of the natural order that would allow individuals to live in society without losing significant freedoms. The concept natural order of Physiocracy originated from "Way of Nature" of Chinese Taoism. The Chinese Taoism had believed that there can be good government only when a perfect harmony exists between the "Way of Man" (governmental institutions) and the "Way of Nature" (Physiocrats' natural order).

The term was used by Friedrich Hayek in his writings. The term is used by Hans-Hermann Hoppe in his 2001 book, Democracy: The God That Failed, to defend anarcho-capitalism.

== See also ==
- Aristocracy
- Aristotelianism
- Creator deity
- Cultural conservatism
- Ethical naturalism
- Naturalism (philosophy)
- Natural law
- Natural rights
- Organicism
- Paleolibertarianism
- Spontaneous order
- Traditionalist conservatism
