= Miguel Anxo Bastos =

Spanish economist

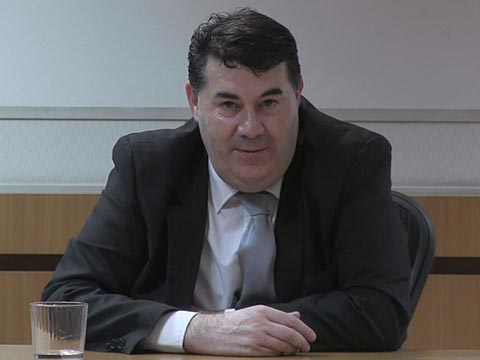
- Born: 12 August 1967 (age 59); Vigo, Spain
- Political party: Galician Nationalist Bloc (formerly)

Academic background
- Influences: Jesús Huerta de Soto; Ludwig von Mises; Friedrich Hayek; Murray Rothbard; Hans-Hermann Hoppe

Academic work
- Discipline: Public policy Social movements Anarcho-capitalism; Paleolibertarianism; Galicianism
- School or tradition: Austrian School

Miguel Anxo Bastos Boubeta (born 12 August 1967) is a Spanish economist of the Austrian School. He is a professor in the Faculty of Political Science and Administration at the University of Santiago de Compostela.

== Education and career ==
Bastos has a doctorate in economic and business science from the University of Santiago de Compostela (USC) and a degree in political and social science from the National University of Distance Education (UNED).

He is currently a professor at the Faculty of Political Science and Administration at USC, his specialty is focused on the field of public policy and contemporary social movements. He has also made different stays as a visiting professor at the Francisco Marroquín University of Guatemala.

== Thought ==
Bastos was a member of the Galician Nationalist Bloc (BNG), basing himself on the ideas of Galicianism and Galician secessionism. During his university years, he openly declared himself a socialist, for which he came into contact, by contrast, with authors of the Austrian School such as Ludwig von Mises, being introduced to the debate on economic calculation by professors of Marxist thought.

He is a disciple of the economist Jesús Huerta de Soto, and together with him they are notable intellectual exponents of anarcho-capitalism in Spain. His main influence on economic theory has been the Austrian economists Friedrich Hayek and Ludwig von Mises. He is aligned with libertarian political views developed by economists and political philosophers Murray Rothbard and Hans-Hermann Hoppe.

He has obtained media exposure due to his lectures on comparative political studies between Austrian School thought and other currents of economic and political thought, usually given at the Juan de Mariana Institute in Spain and at the Francisco Marroquín University in Guatemala.
