= David Gordon (philosopher) =

American libertarian philosopher and intellectual historian (born 1948)

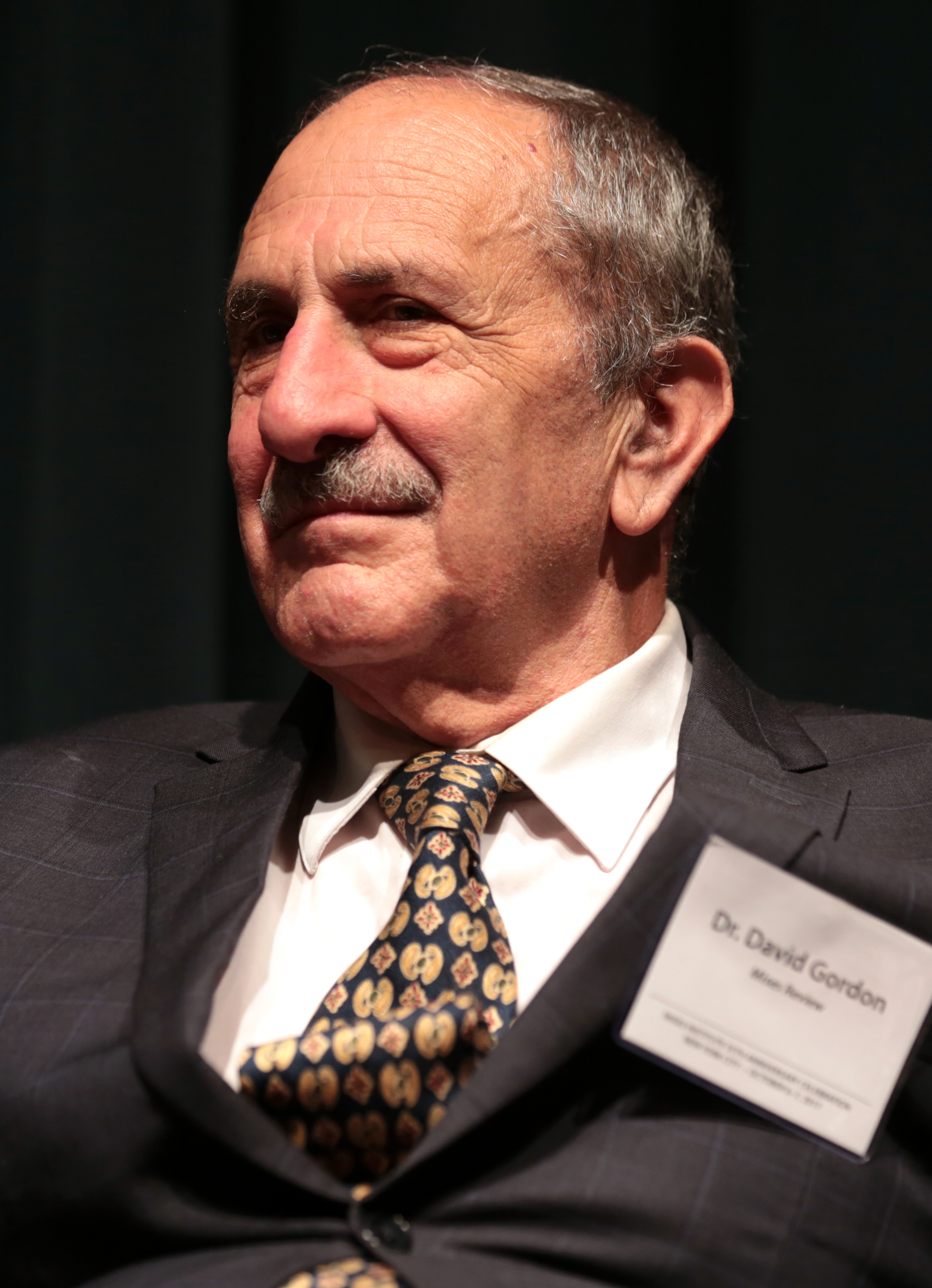
- Gordon in 2017
- Born: April 7, 1948 (age 78)
- Education: University of California, Los Angeles (PhD)
- Occupations: Philosopher; historian

David Gordon (born April 7, 1948) is an American libertarian philosopher and intellectual historian. He has written extensively on Murray Rothbard and Austrian economics. He is a senior fellow of the Ludwig von Mises Institute, a libertarian think tank.

== Education ==
Gordon received a PhD in history from the University of California, Los Angeles (UCLA).

== Career ==
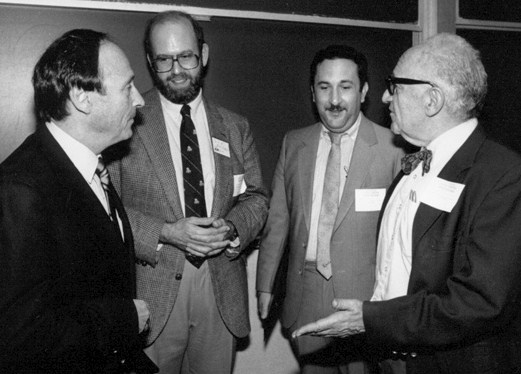
Burton Blumert, Lew Rockwell, David Gordon, and Murray Rothbard

Gordon is a senior fellow of the Mises Institute. He has worked for another libertarian think tank, the Cato Institute from 1979 to 1980. He has also written for the Rothbard-Rockwell Report, published by Murray Rothbard and Lew Rockwell. He specializes in Rothbard's works on political theory, history, economics, and other subjects.

In 1985, Gordon worked with Walter Block on a law review article, "Extortion and the Exercise of Free Speech Rights". In this article, they explored the contradictions and paradoxes in laws against blackmail and the conditions under which such laws may be acceptable.

=== Neo-Marxism ===
Gordon's 1991 book Resurrecting Marx: The Analytical Marxists on Freedom, Exploitation, and Justice was described by Mises Institute scholar Yuri Maltsev as "a refutation of neo-Marxist attempts to save the system from itself". The book refutes the arguments of Marxist political philosophers, including G. A. Cohen, Jon Elster, and John Roemer, and opposes every form of Marxism as theoretically nonviable. Gordon argues that capitalism could not be exploitative and that laissez-faire capitalism could serve a just world, concluding that Marxism is "a complete failure".

The American Political Science Review said Gordon's argument was "rather crude", and Contemporary Sociology said Gordon failed to show that analytical Marxists were "a formidable weapon in the hands of anti-Marxists such as himself". Contemporary Society also said that Gordon had shown little competence in anti-Marxist argument, falling into "easily avoided mistakes". Paul Gottfried, writing in The Review of Metaphysics assessed the book more positively, stating that Gordon had demonstrated that Cohen, Elster, and Roemer had failed to "rehabilitate Marx's economic theories". The review said that Gordon's explanation of his own libertarian stance was "by far the most stimulating". Oxford political scientist David Leopold noted that Gordon’s “thumbnail test” for classifying a writer as an analytical Marxist reflects a common, though “misleading and unfortunate”, understanding of the school. Gordon wrote that a favorable stance on dialectics meant that the writer must be "crossed off the list".

=== Austrian economics ===
Gordon's book The Philosophical Origins of Austrian Economics (1992), which explores the philosophical origins of Carl Menger's economic theories, was highly praised by Murray Rothbard. Writing in The Review of Austrian Economics, Barry Smith criticized the book for its over-simplistic division of philosophers into two camps—German (Hegelian, organicist, and anti-science) and Austrian (Aristotelian, individualist and pro-science)—despite philosophers having more complex interrelations. For example, Franz Brentano, a model of Austrian thought, was born in Germany and was strongly influenced by German philosopher Friedrich Adolf Trendelenburg. Gordon later wrote an essay, "Second Thoughts on The Philosophical Origins of Austrian Economics", to provide some additions and corrections to his book.

=== Other work ===
In 2002, Gordon edited Secession, State & Liberty, a collection of essays arguing that ⁣⁣secession⁣⁣ should be seriously considered. The essays analyze U.S. history, examine theoretical issues, and apply these ideas to the modern world.

Gordon has also contributed to Analysis, International Philosophical Quarterly, The Journal of Libertarian Studies, The Quarterly Journal of Austrian Economics, Social Philosophy and Policy, and Econ Journal Watch. He has also been published in the Orange County Register, The American Conservative and The Freeman.

In 2011, Gordon and Swedish consultant Per Nilsson analyzed books published by Harvard University Press in their paper "The Ideological Profile of Harvard University Press: Categorizing 494 Books Published 2000–2010" in Econ Journal Watch. They concluded that the press's ideology is predominantly leftist, although they acknowledged that they had not read all the books they categorized.

== Books ==
- Resurrecting Marx: The Analytical Marxists on Freedom, Exploitation, and Justice. Transaction Publishers. 1991. ISBN 978-0-88738-390-8.
- Editor, with Jeremy Shearmur. H. B. Acton's The Morals of Markets and Related Essays, (1971) essays. 2nd edition (1993), Liberty Fund, ISBN 978-0-86597-106-6.
- The Philosophical Origins of Austrian Economics. Mises Institute. 1996. ISBN 978-0-945466-14-7.
- An Introduction to Economic Reasoning (ebook version) (PDF). Mises Institute. 2000. ISBN 978-0-945466-28-4.
- Editor, Secession, State & Liberty. Transaction Publishers. 2002. ISBN 978-0-7658-0943-8.
- The Essential Rothbard. Mises Institute. 2007. ISBN 978-1-933550-10-7.
