= Jesús Huerta de Soto =

Spanish economist of the Austrian School (born 1956)

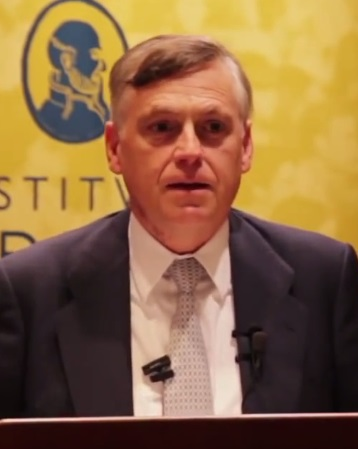
- Jesús Huerta de Soto in 2014
- Born: 23 December 1956 (age 69); Madrid, Spain

Academic background
- Education: Complutense University of Madrid; Stanford University

Academic work
- Discipline: Political economics
- School or tradition: Austrian School
- Institutions: Universidad Rey Juan Carlos
- Awards: King Juan Carlos International Prize for Economics, Adam Smith Prize, Franz Kuechel Prize for Excellence in Economic Education

Jesús Huerta de Soto Ballester (/ˈwɛərtə deɪ ˈsoʊtoʊ/; Spanish: [ˈweɾta ðe ˈsoto]; born December 23, 1956) is a Spanish economist of the Austrian School. He is a professor in the Department of Applied Economics at King Juan Carlos University of Madrid, Spain and a Senior Fellow at the Mises Institute.

== Education and career ==
Huerta de Soto received a bachelor's degree in economics in 1978 and a PhD in economics in 1992, from Complutense University. His MBA in actuarial science is from Stanford University, 1985. In 2000, he became a full professor of Political Economy at Universidad Rey Juan Carlos in Madrid. Since 2007 he is director of the Austrian Economics Master Program Master Economía de la Escuela Austríaca at the Rey Juan Carlos University.

Huerta de Soto was editor of seven volumes of the Spanish-language version of the University of Chicago Press's The Collected Works of F. A. Hayek. In that capacity, he was responsible for bibliographies, footnotes, introductions, and hiring translators. He is a member of the editorial board of New Perspectives on Political Economy and on the advisory editorial board of the Journal of Markets and Morality. Huerta de Soto is a Senior Fellow of the Mises Institute and is on the editorial board of its Quarterly Journal of Austrian Economics. He was formerly a Trustee of the Madrid Institute for Advanced Studies (IMDEA) in social sciences and was a vice-president and director of the Mont Pelerin Society from 2000 to 2004.

== Economic views ==
=== Classical liberalism ===
An anarcho-capitalist, Huerta de Soto argues that classical liberalism and their ideal is theoretically impossible; he also believes that classical liberals have failed to limit the power of the state.

=== General equilibrium theory ===
Economist Leland B. Yeager has cited Huerta de Soto as an example of scorn in economics. Yeager states that Soto scorns general equilibrium theory, citing a passage in which Soto refers to the "pernicious analysis" of price equilibrium at "the intersection of mysterious curves or functions lacking any real existence...even in the minds of the actors involved."

=== Austrian business cycle and full reserve banking ===
Huerta de Soto advocates full-reserve banking, a system in which 100% reserve requirements for banks would prevent any expansion of credit.

In 2006, Huerta de Soto wrote an 876-page book on the subject, published in English by the Mises Institute as Money, Bank Credit, and Economic Cycles. Samuel Gregg reviewed the book writing that "[t]he sheer length of this text will demand much time and concentration of readers wishing to fully absorb its insights. Certainly there is an element of repetition at different points. This tends, however, to reflect De Soto's determination to demonstrate that the moral, legal, and economic dimensions of money, credit, and banking cannot be artificially separated from each other without risking the loss of a sound understanding of the subject." In the journal New Perspectives on Political Economy, Ludwig van den Hauwe suggested that "[e]ven if it may be difficult at this time to gauge in any precise manner the effect the book will have on the economics profession at large, there can be no doubt the book is destined to become a classic, both by virtue of the subject matters that are treated and in virtue of the manner in which they are treated: thoroughly and authoritatively."

Larry J. Sechrest's review of Huerta de Soto's book, also published by the Mises Institute, stated that the author attempted to provide "final and decisive proof" that fractional reserve banking is incompatible with private property rights, morality, and a stable economy. Sechrest wrote that although Huerta de Soto presented a painstaking investigation of legal theory, banking history, business cycles, and medieval theological doctrine, a great deal of it is irrelevant to the book's thesis. Sechrest concludes "Above all, Huerta de Soto refuses to even consider the possibility that banks' customers may have been quite willing to face some risk exposure in exchange for the benefits 100 percent reserve banks are unable to provide" and believes that "any departure from 100 percent reserve banking is automatically taken to be evidence of malfeasance by bankers, even when there is no clear data on the details of the contractual relations negotiated by depositors."

In his chapter on "Attempts to Legally Justify Fractional-Reserve Banking", Huerta de Soto considers the possibility "that a certain group of bank customers (or for the sake of argument, all of them) enter into a deposit contract aware and fully accepting that banks will invest (or loan, etc.) a large portion of the money they deposit". In this case, argues Huerta de Soto, "the supposed authorization from the depositors lacks legal validity" because few lay-persons understand the instability inherent in fractional-reserve banking: they believe their deposit is guaranteed, which Huerta de Soto considers a (near universal) misconception. As evidence of the true wishes of depositors, he cites the riots that resulted when banks suspended payments during the 1998–2002 Argentine great depression.

=== Money and banking ===
Andre Azevedo Alves and Jose Moreira state that Huerta de Soto has written the "most complete and integrated analysis of the theories of banking" of the School of Salamanca.

== Reception ==
In a review for the Mises Institute's Review of Austrian Economics, Institute Associated Scholar Leland B. Yeager called the book "the most thorough treatment in print of Austrian ideas on banking and the business cycle". Mises Institute Senior Fellow and former United States representative Ron Paul endorsed Huerta de Soto's view that fractional reserve banking is the cause of financial instability. An Institute of Economic Affairs review described The Theory of Dynamic Efficiency as "[a] major new collection in the field of Austrian economics" and called Huerta de Soto "a leading Spanish scholar".

== Honorary doctorates ==
- Universidad Francisco Marroquín (2009)
- Alexandru Ioan Cuza University (2010)
- Finance University under the Government of the Russian Federation (2011)

== Publications ==
=== Books ===
- Planes de pensiones privados [Private Pension Benefit] (in Spanish). Madrid: Editorial San Martin. 1984. p. 294. ISBN 978-8471402226. OCLC 11783782.
- Lecturas de economía política [Readings in Political Economy] (in Spanish). Madrid: Unión Editorial. 1986–1987. ISBN 978-8472092013. 3 volumes: OCLC 434819610, 632702538, 632702507
- La escuela austríaca: mercado y creatividad empresarial [The Austrian School: Market Process and Entrepreneurial Creativity] (in Spanish). Madrid: Editorial Síntesis. 2000. p. 203. Series: Historia del pensamiento económico. OCLC 247910035, 45036015, 644714015
- Estudios de economía política [Studies in Political Economy] (in Spanish) (2a ed.). Madrid Unión Editorial. 2004. p. 342. ISBN 978-8472094086. OCLC 433538594.
- Nuevos estudios de economía política [New Studies in Political Economy] (in Spanish) (2a ed.). Madrid Unión Editorial. 2007. p. 494. ISBN 978-8472094406. OCLC 733682262. Series: Nueva biblioteca de la libertad
- The Austrian School: Market Order and Entrepreneurial Creativity. Cheltenham (UK); Northampton (MA, US): E. Elgar. 2008. p. 129. ISBN 978-1847207685. OCLC 494726098. "Presents an exposition of the main tenets of the Austrian School of Economics. This book also explains the differences between the Austrian and the neoclassical (including the Chicago School) approaches to economics. It covers reviews of the contributions of the main Austrian economists, and analysis of the major objections to Austrian economics. (WorldCat summary)"
- The Theory of Dynamic Efficiency. London: Routledge. 2009. p. 359. ISBN 978-0415427692. OCLC 488049275.
- Peníze, Banky a Hospodářské Krize [Money, Banking and Economic Crisis] (in Czech). Prague: ASPI a Liberální institut (ASPI and the Liberal Institute). 2009. p. 865. ISBN 978-8073574116. OCLC 320215103. (with Martin Froněk)
- Socialism, Economic Calculation, and Entrepreneurship. Cheltenham (UK); Northampton (MA, US): E. Elgar. 2010. p. 310. ISBN 978-1849800655. OCLC 781201845. (Originally as Socialismo, cálculo económico y función empresarial; part of the New Thinking in Political Economy series by the Institute of Economic Affairs)
- Dinero, Crédito Bancario y Ciclos Económicos (in Spanish) (5a ed.). Madrid: Unión Editorial. 2011. p. 685. ISBN 978-8472095472. OCLC 828532975.
- Chapter 2: A brief note on economic recessions, banking reform and the future of capitalism in Óscar Dejuán, Eladio Febrero, Maria Cristina Marcuzzo (editors), The First Great Recession of the 21st Century: Competing Explanations, Edward Elgar Publishing, 2011, ISBN 1849807469
- Money, Bank Credit, and Economic Cycles (3d ed.). Auburn, AL: Ludwig von Mises Institute. 2012. p. 881. ISBN 978-1610161893. OCLC 807678778. (with Melinda A. Stroup, translator) Also available as a PDF here

=== Journals ===
For a list of articles published in Spanish, English, and other languages, see the Huerta de Soto website.

- "A critical analysis of central banks and fractional-reserve free banking from the Austrian school perspective". The Review of Austrian Economics (Kluwer Academic Publishers) 8 (2):25–38. 1995.
- "New Light on the Prehistory of the Theory of Banking and the School of Salamanca". The Review of Austrian Economics 9 (2): 59–81. 1996.
- "The Ongoing Methodenstreit of the Austrian School". Journal des Économistes et des Études Humaines. 8 (1):75–113 1998.
- "Conjectured History and Beyond," Humane Studies Review. 6 (2):10. Winter, 1998–1999.
- "A Critical Note on Fractional-Reserve Free Banking," Quarterly Journal of Austrian Economics. 1 (4):25–49. Winter, 1998.
- "The Ethics of Capitalism". Journal of Markets & Morality, (Acton Institute) 2 (2):150–163. 1999. ISSN 1098-1217
- "Hayek's Best Test of a Good Economist". Procesos de Mercado: Revista Europea de Economía Política. I (2):121–124. 2004. ISSN 1697-6797
- Huerta De Soto, Jesús (2009). "The Essence of the Austrian School". Economic Affairs. 29 (2). Blackwell Publishing: 42–45. doi:10.1111/j.1468-0270.2009.01892.x. ISSN 0265-0665. OCLC 439651091. S2CID 219970251.
- Huerta De Soto, Jesús (2009). "The Fatal Error of Solvency II". Economic Affairs. 29 (2). Blackwell Publishing: 74–77. doi:10.1111/j.1468-0270.2009.01900.x. ISSN 0265-0665. OCLC 439651128. S2CID 219968413.
- "Economic Recessions, Banking Reform and the Future of Capitalism I". Economic Affairs. 31 (2). Blackwell Publishing. 2011. ISSN 0265-0665. OCLC 729292944.

== See also ==
- Libertarianism
- Ludwig von Mises
- Miguel Anxo Bastos
