= Shearmur =

Shearmur is a surname. Notable people with the surname include:

- Allison Shearmur (1963–2018), American film executive and producer
- Edward Shearmur (born 1966), British film composer
- Jeremy Shearmur (born 1948), Australian academic
