= Jeremy Shearmur =

Australian academic

- Born: 13 June 1948 (age 78)

Education
- Education: London School of Economics and Political Science

Philosophical work
- Era: 20th-century philosophy
- Region: Western philosophy
- School: Critical rationalism Classical liberalism
- Institutions: London School of Economics; University of Edinburgh; University of Manchester; Centre for Policy Studies; George Mason University
- Main interests: Epistemology; Rationality; Philosophy of science Social and political philosophy Philosophy of mind

Jeremy Shearmur (born 13 June 1948) is a British former reader in philosophy in the School of Philosophy at the Australian National University, who retired at the end of 2013. He is currently an emeritus fellow, lives in Dumfries, Scotland, and is undertaking research and a limited amount of lecturing and Ph.D. supervision. He was educated at the London School of Economics.

He has taught at the University of Edinburgh, the University of Manchester, and at George Mason University, where he was a research associate professor at the Institute for Humane Studies. He was also director of studies of the Centre for Policy Studies, in London.

After briefly pursuing studies in librarianship, he worked for eight years as assistant to Karl Popper.

== Works ==
- Acton, H. B. (1993). Gordon, David; Shearmur, Jeremy (eds.). The Morals of Markets and Related Essays. Indianapolis: Liberty Fund.
- Hayek and After: Hayekian Liberalism as a Research Programme. London and New York: Routledge. 1996.
- The Political Thought of Karl Popper. London and New York: Routledge. 1996.
- Popper, Karl (2008). Shearmur, Jeremy; Turner, Piers Norris (eds.). After the Open Society: Selected Social and Political Writings. Abingdon, Oxon: Routledge. ISBN 978-0-415-61023-0.
- Shearmur, Jeremy; Stokes, Geoffrey, eds. (2016). The Cambridge Companion to Popper. Cambridge and New York, NY: Cambridge University Press.
- Briskman, Laurence Barry (2020). Shearmur, Jeremy (ed.). A Sceptical Theory of Scientific Enquiry: Problems and Their Progress (Series in the Philosophy of Karl R. Popper and Critical Rationalism ). Leiden and Boston: Brill.
- Hayek, F. A. (2021). Shearmur, Jeremy (ed.). The Collected Works of F. A. Hayek: Law, Legislation and Liberty: New Statement of Liberal Principles of Justice and Political Economy. Vol. XIX. Chicago, IL: The University of Chicago Press. ISBN 9780226782003.
