= What Has Government Done to Our Money? =

1963 book by Murray Rothbard

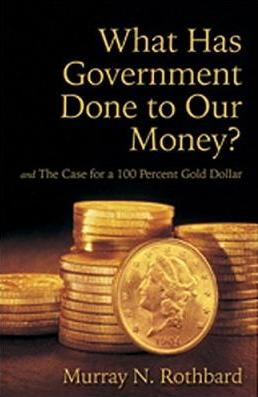
- Author: Murray N. Rothbard
- Language: English
- Genre: Economics
- Publisher: Ludwig Von Mises Institute
- Publication date: 1963
- Publication place: United States
- Media type: Hardback
- ISBN: 978-0-945466-44-4
- OCLC: 62395471

What Has Government Done to Our Money? is a 1963 book by Murray N. Rothbard that details the history of money, from early barter systems, to the gold standard, to present day systems of paper money.

== Topics ==
=== How money developed ===
Rothbard explains how money was originally developed, and why gold was chosen as the preferred commodity to use as money.

=== The gold standard ===
The essay, "What Has Government Done to Our Money?" was written by Rothbard as an objective historical account with a provocative title. In contrast, "The Case for a 100 Percent Gold Dollar" was an essay with an ethical agenda. Both essays are normally found together in one binding.

In "The Case for a 100 Percent Gold Dollar", Rothbard argues that having a currency permanently fixed by law at a certain weight in gold, and always redeemable in gold, greatly incentivizes governments and banks to be much more ethical, civil, and honest in their lending methods, accounting methods, and in their honorable pursuits of other profits related to managing and supplying money to society.

In this section, Rothbard argues against any monetary policy that increases the amount of money in circulation. According to Rothbard, increasing the supply of money confuses society's ability to calculate relative costs during the time of monetary expansion. This is because the money is not injected into all areas of the economy at once, resulting in what Rothbard describes as deceiving investors with "wasteful booms" and subsequent readjustments, instead of normal and healthy opportunities for investment.

=== Leaving the gold standard ===
Rothbard states that many European governments went bankrupt due to World War I, and how they left the gold standard in order to try to solve their financial issues. He also argues that this strategy was partially responsible for World War II, and led to economic problems throughout the world.

== Reception ==
In 2010, Gregory White in Business Insider distilled the book into a slideshow called the "9 Stages of Monetary Breakdown", sourcing the Mises Institute.

In 2025, after a title fight loss, mixed martial arts fighter Renato Moicano posted, "I wish I had won yesterday, grabbed the microphone, and told you to read Murray Rothbard’s What Has Government Done to Our Money!"
