= Lew Rockwell =

American libertarian writer (born 1944)

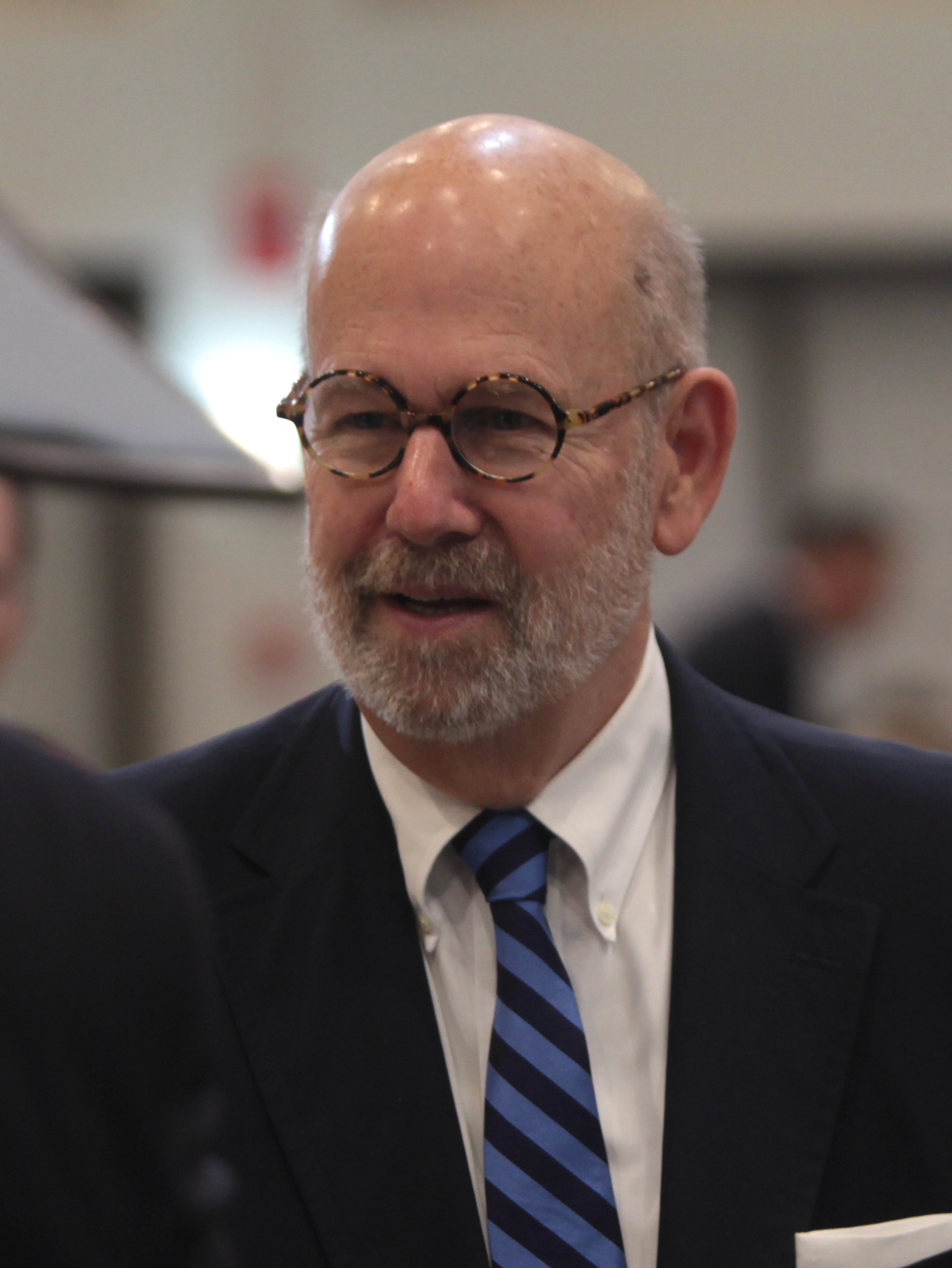
- Rockwell at a Mises Institute event in 2015

Chairman of the Mises Institute
- Incumbent
- Assumed office October 1982

Personal details
- Born: Llewellyn Harrison Rockwell Jr. July 1, 1944 (age 82) Boston, Massachusetts, U.S.
- Spouse: Mardelle Rockwell
- Education: Tufts University (BA)
- Website: www.lewrockwell.com

Llewellyn Harrison Rockwell Jr. (born July 1, 1944) is an American author, editor, and political consultant. A libertarian and a self-professed anarcho-capitalist, he founded and is the chairman of the Mises Institute, a non-profit promoting the Austrian School of economics.

After graduating from university, Rockwell had jobs at the conservative Arlington House Publishers, the radical-right John Birch Society, and the traditionalist Hillsdale College. Reading the works of Murray Rothbard, who became his mentor, led Rockwell to become an ardent believer in Austrian economics and what he calls "libertarian anarchism". Rockwell was chief of staff to Congressman Ron Paul from 1978 to 1982, and was a founding officer and former vice president at Ron Paul & Associates. Rockwell partnered with Rothbard in 1982 to found the Mises Institute in Alabama, where as of 2025, Rockwell still serves as chairman.

Rockwell's website, LewRockwell.com, was launched in 1999. The website features articles about political philosophy, economics, and contemporary politics. The website's motto is "anti-war, anti-state, pro-market".

== Life and career ==
Rockwell was born in Boston, Massachusetts, in 1944. After college, Rockwell worked at Arlington House Publishers and became acquainted with the works of Ludwig von Mises.

A former member of the radical-right John Birch Society, Rockwell worked in its Member's Monthly Message Department before resigning amid disputes with the society's leaders. In the mid-1970s, Rockwell worked at the traditionalist Hillsdale College in fundraising and public relations.

Rockwell met the anarcho-capitalist Murray Rothbard in 1975 and credits Rothbard with convincing him to abandon minarchism and reject the state completely. In 1985, Rockwell was named a contributing editor to Conservative Digest. Rockwell also served as Vice President of the Center for Libertarian Studies in Burlingame, California, which published the Rothbard-Rockwell Report. Rockwell was closely associated with Rothbard until Rothbard's death in 1995.

=== Work for Ron Paul (1978–) ===
Rockwell was Ron Paul's congressional chief of staff from 1978 to 1982 and was a consultant to Paul's 1988 Libertarian Party campaign for President of the United States. He was vice-chair of the exploratory committee for Paul's run for the 1992 Republican Party nomination for president.

=== Ron Paul newsletters ===
Rockwell was a founding officer and former vice president at Ron Paul & Associates, which was one of the publishers of a variety of political and investment-oriented newsletters bearing Paul's name.

In January 2008, during Ron Paul's 2008 presidential campaign, James Kirchick of The New Republic uncovered a collection of Ron Paul newsletters that contained "decades worth of obsession with conspiracies, sympathy for the right-wing militia movement, and deeply held bigotry against blacks, Jews, and gays." For instance, one issue approved of the slogan "Sodomy = Death" and said homosexuals suffering from HIV/AIDS "enjoy the pity and attention that comes with being sick".

Most of the articles contained no bylines. Numerous sources alleged that Rockwell had ghostwritten the controversial newsletters; Rockwell is listed as "contributing editor" on physical copies of some newsletters and listed as sole Editor of the May 1988 "Ron Paul investment Newsletter". Reason magazine reported that "a half-dozen longtime libertarian activists – including some still close to Paul" had identified Rockwell as the "chief ghostwriter" of the newsletters, as did former Ron Paul Chief of Staff (1981–1985) John W. Robbins.

Rockwell admitted to Kirchick that he was "involved in the promotion" of the newsletters and wrote the subscription letters but denied ghostwriting the articles. He said there were "seven or eight freelancers involved at various stages" of the newsletter's history and indicated another individual who had "left in unfortunate circumstances" and "is now long gone", but whom he did not identify, was in charge of editing and publishing the newsletters. Rockwell has described discussion of the newsletters scandal as "hysterical smears aimed at political enemies." Ron Paul himself repudiated the newsletters' content and said he was not involved in the daily operations of the newsletters or saw much of their content until years later. In 2011, Paul's spokesperson Jesse Benton said that Paul had "taken moral responsibility because they appeared under his name and slipped through under his watch".

=== Mises Institute (1982–) ===
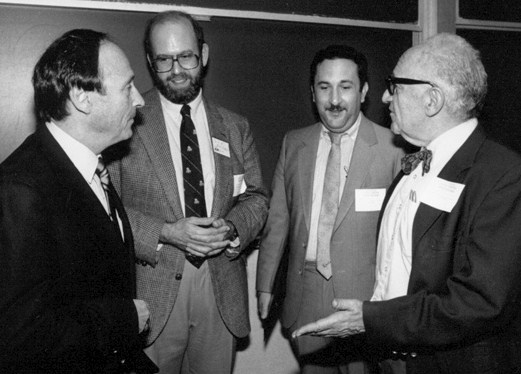
Burton Blumert, Rockwell, economist and philosopher David Gordon, and Murray Rothbard

In 1982, Rockwell founded the Ludwig von Mises Institute in Auburn, Alabama, and is chairman of the board.

The Mises Institute published Rockwell's Speaking of Liberty, an anthology of editorials which were originally published on his website, along with transcripts from some of his speaking engagements. The institute hosted conferences on secession; Rockwell wrote before a 1995 conference, "We'll explore what causes [secession] and how to promote it."

=== Paleolibertarianism (1980s–2000s) ===
Rockwell, Rothbard and others described their views as paleolibertarian to describe their cultural conservatism fused with their otherwise anti-statist beliefs. They forged a "paleo alliance" between paleolibertarians and paleoconservatives in the form of the John Randolph Club in 1989, which allied the Mises Institute and the paleoconservative Rockford Institute.

In a 2007 interview, Rockwell revealed he no longer considered himself a "paleolibertarian" and was "happy with the term libertarian." He explained "the term paleolibertarian became confused because of its association with paleoconservative, so it came to mean some sort of socially conservative libertarian, which wasn't the point at all..."

=== LewRockwell.com (1999–) ===
Rockwell's website, LewRockwell.com, formed in 1999, features articles and blog entries by various columnists and writers. Its motto is "anti-war, anti-state, pro-market". There also is a weekly podcast called The Lew Rockwell Show. As of March 2017, it was in the top 10,000 websites in the United States. LewRockwell.com publishes articles questioning United States participation in World War II, opposing "economic fascism" and supporting Austrian economics and secessionism. The website is primarily home to right-libertarian authors, although left-wing anti-war writers have been featured. The academic Tanni Haas wrote in his 2011 book on political bloggers that of the 20 figures he interviewed, "none have more radical views" than Rockwell, whose avowed goal was to "do everything he can to undermine the state". Rockwell and his website have also promoted neo-Confederate views.

Brian Doherty of Reason wrote that the site's "Mises Institute-associated writers" tend to emphasize the domestic and international fallout from government action. Conservative writer Jonah Goldberg of National Review wrote that the site regularly hosts invective against icons of American mainstream conservatism, including National Review, The Weekly Standard, neoconservatives, and William F. Buckley Jr. A writer in The American Conservative described the site as paleolibertarian and "an indispensable source" of news on Ron Paul. The site published InfoWars articles by the conspiracy theorist Paul Joseph Watson from 2011 to 2016. The site has been criticized for presenting articles which advocate HIV/AIDS denialism, the view that HIV does not cause AIDS, and the view that vaccines cause autism.

=== Other activities and views ===
Rockwell's paleolibertarian ideology, like Rothbard's in his later years, combines a right-libertarian theory of anarcho-capitalism based on natural rights with the cultural conservative values and concerns of paleoconservatism, and he identifies strongly with the modern Rothbardian tradition of Austrian economics. In politics, he advocates federalist or Anti-Federalist policies as means to achieve increasing degrees of freedom from central government and secession for the same political decentralist reasons. Rockwell has called environmentalism "an ideology as pitiless and Messianic as Marxism." In his book Left, Right, and The State, he advocated for legalization of drunk driving. Rockwell is Catholic.

== Books ==
=== Author ===
- Speaking of Liberty (2003; online e-book) ISBN 0-945466-38-2
- The Left, The Right, and The State (2008; online e-book) ISBN 978-1-933550-20-6
- Against the State: An Anarcho-Capitalist Manifesto (2014) ISBN 0990463109
- Fascism vs. Capitalism (2013) ISBN 1494399806
- Against The Left: A Rothbardian Libertarianism (2019) ISBN 978-0-9904631-5-3

=== Editor ===
- Man, Economy, and Liberty: Essays in Honor of Murray N. Rothbard (with Walter Block) (1986; online e-book) ISBN 99911-786-2-7
- The Free Market Reader (1988; online e-book)ISBN 0-945466-02-1
- The Economics of Liberty (1990; online e-book) ISBN 0-945466-08-0
- The Gold Standard: Perspectives in the Austrian School (1992; online e-book), ISBN 0-945466-11-0
- Murray N. Rothbard: In Memoriam (1995; online e-book) ISBN 0-945466-19-6
- The Irrepressible Rothbard (2000; online e-book – Rockwell's introduction) ISBN 1-883959-02-0

== See also ==
- Anarcho-capitalism
- Hans-Hermann Hoppe
- Libertarianism in the United States
- Ludwig von Mises
- Milton Friedman
- Mises Institute
- Ron Paul
- Thomas Sowell
- Tom Woods
