= Property and Freedom Society =

Far-right conference and blog

- Abbreviation: PFS
- Formation: 2006
- Location: Bodrum, Turkey
- Services: Conferences, Online blog
- Fields: Austrian school of economics Anarcho-capitalism; Paleoconservatism; Far-right politics Anti-democracy
- President: Hans-Hermann Hoppe
- Key people: Saifedean Ammous; Thomas DiLorenzo; Jeremy Hammond; Stephan Kinsella
- Website: propertyandfreedom.org

The Property and Freedom Society (PFS) is an anarcho-capitalist and far-right annual conference hosted in Bodrum, Turkey, and online blog founded in May 2006 by Hans-Hermann Hoppe. Leading paleolibertarian and paleoconservative intellectuals deliver speeches. The group has garnered controversy for including speakers from the American alt-right and European New Right, such as white supremacists Jared Taylor and Richard Spencer and the eugenicist Richard Lynn.

== History and mission ==
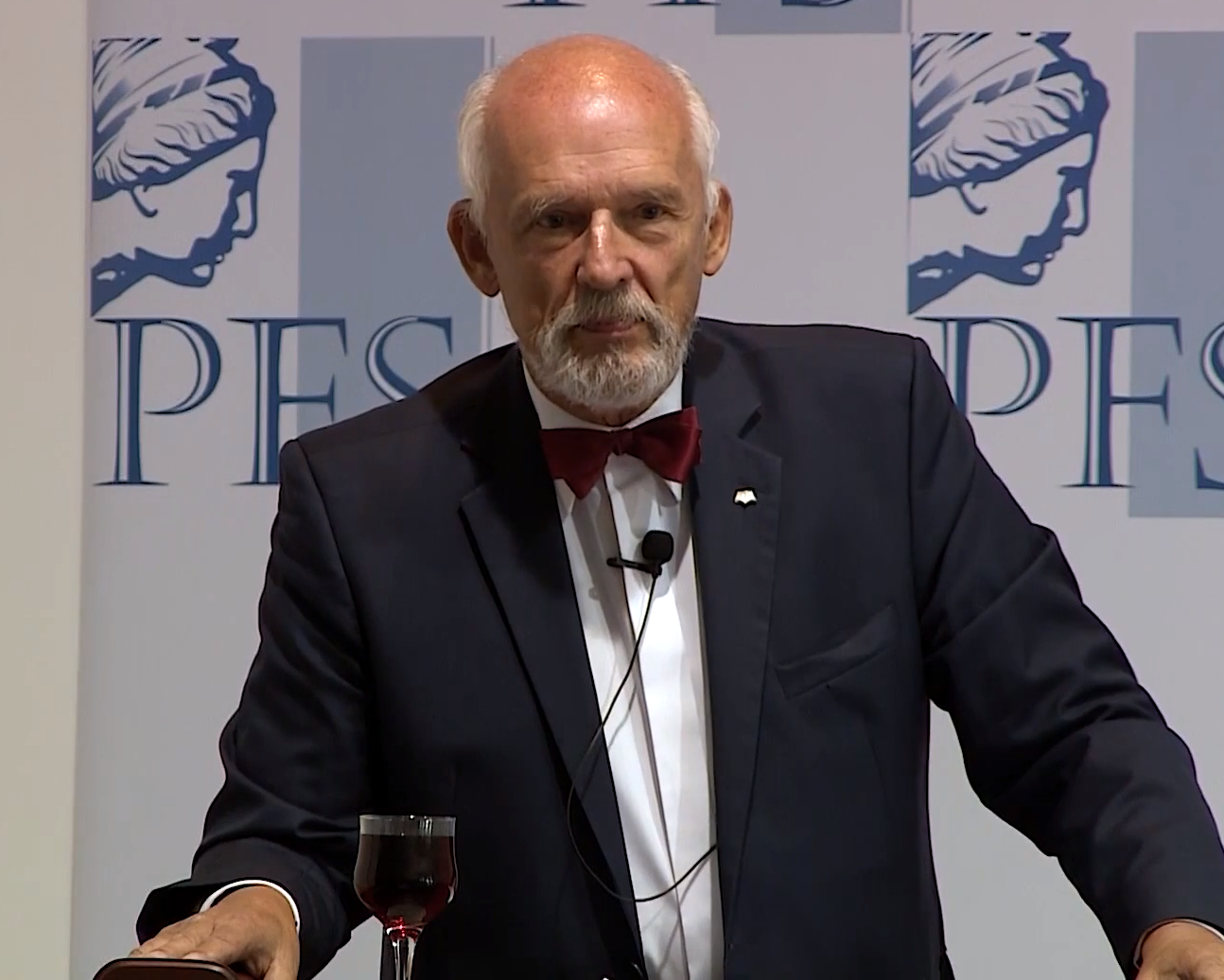
Janusz Korwin-Mikke speaking at the 2017 PFS

PFS conferences include members of the former John Randolph Club along with "new advocates of stateless libertarianism and racial secession", in the words of the academic Quinn Slobodian. According to the society, it promotes free trade, peace, and the right to "discriminate against anyone in one's personal and business relations".

On the fifth anniversary of PFS, Hoppe reflected on its goals: "On the one hand, positively, it was to explain and elucidate the legal, economic, cognitive and cultural requirements and features of a free, state-less natural order. On the other hand, negatively, it was to unmask the State and showcase it for what it really is: an institution run by gangs of murderers, plunderers, and thieves, surrounded by willing executioners, propagandists, sycophants, crooks, liars, clowns, charlatans, dupes and useful idiots – an institution that dirties and taints everything it touches."

In a 2017 speech titled "Libertarianism and the Alt-Right", Hoppe asserted that "highly restrictive, highly selective and discriminating immigration" was "highly compatible with libertarianism and its desideratum of freedom of association and opposition to forced integration".

Leading figures of the European New Right and the American alt-right hosted by the conference have included Peter Brimelow, John Derbyshire, Thomas DiLorenzo, Paul Gottfried, Janusz Korwin-Mikke, Richard Lynn, Steve Sailer, Richard Spencer, Tomislav Sunić, and Jared Taylor.

== Conferences ==
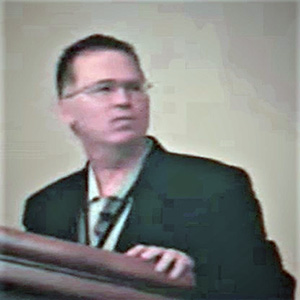
Steve Sailor speaking at the 2018 PFS

Conferences have been held annually since 2005, in Bodrum, Turkey. At the conferences, "prophets of racial and social breakdown share the stage with investment advisors and financial consultants", Slobodian wrote in 2023.

The PFS annual meeting explicitly aims to promote discrimination as logical choice. In addition to the formal proceedings of the conferences, there are integrated activities such as a boat trip into the Aegean Sea, excursions to local fishing villages, and firework displays followed by gala nights.

== Racism and White Nationalism ==
PFS has garnered controversy for including speakers such as the white supremacists Jared Taylor and Richard Spencer and the eugenicist academic Richard Lynn. A Las Vegas Review-Journal article noted that Lynn has described black people as "more psychopathic than whites" at the 2007 Property and Freedom Society conference. Heidi Beirich of the Southern Poverty Law Center (SPLC) described the 2007 conference as a "serious academic racist event". A 2013 Anti-Defamation League report about "increased cooperation" between European and American racists cited Taylor's speech "A Brief History of US Race Relations" at the 2013 PFS conference titled.

Describing the PFS, the SPLC said in 2016 that "in Hoppe one can see the connection between the ultra-Libertarians and white nationalists". Intelligencer in 2017 described the annual PFS meeting as "Davos, but for racists".

== Sources ==
- Hermansson, Patrik; Lawrence, David; Mulhall, Joe; Murdoch, Simon (2020). The International Alt-Right. doi:10.4324/9780429032486. ISBN 978-0429032486.
- Slobodian, Quinn (2023). Crack-Up Capitalism: Market Radicals and the Dream of a World Without Democracy. Metropolitan Books. ISBN 978-125075390-8.
- Wasserman, Janek (2019). The Marginal Revolutionaries. Yale University Press. doi:10.12987/9780300249170. ISBN 978-0300249170. JSTOR j.ctvnwbxwf.
