= Hans-Hermann Hoppe =

Libertarian and anti-democracy philosopher

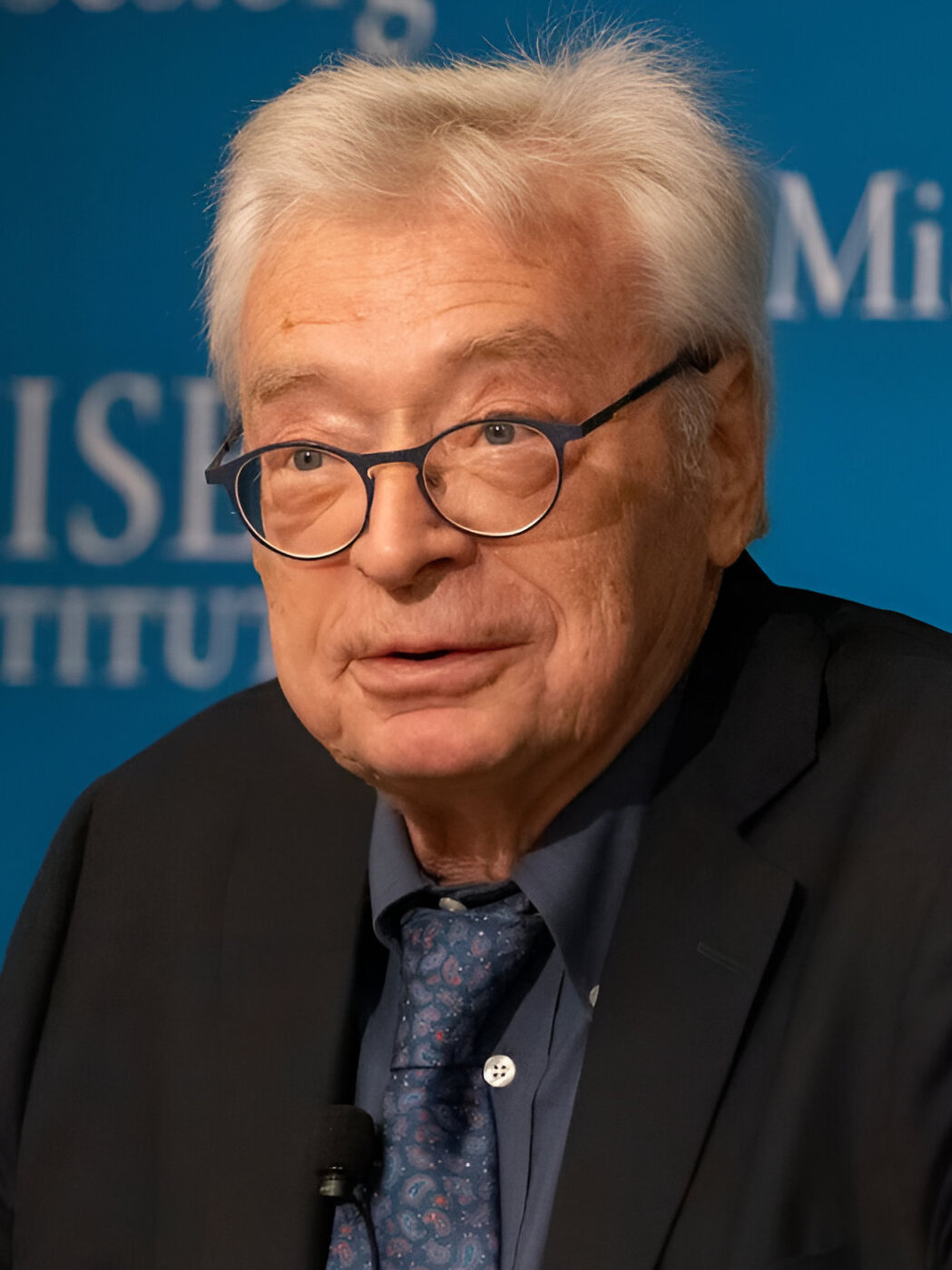
- Hoppe in 2024
- Born: 2 September 1949 (age 77); Peine, West Germany
- Movement: Anarcho-capitalism; Cultural conservatism Paleolibertarianism; Anti-democracy
- Spouse(s): Gülçin Imre Hoppe; Margaret Rudelich (div.)

Academic background
- Education: Goethe University Frankfurt
- Influences: Kant; Haller; Molinari; Mises; Jouvenel; Kuehnelt-Leddihn; Lorenzen; Apel; Rothbard; Habermas

Academic work
- Discipline: Politics; Economics; Epistemology; Philosophy and economics; Culture
- School or tradition: Austrian School; Continental philosophy
- Institutions: Business school of University of Nevada, Las Vegas; Mises Institute (until 2026); Property and Freedom Society
- Notable ideas: Argumentation ethics Capitalist critique of democracy
- Awards: The Gary G. Schlarbaum Prize (2006); Franz Cuhel Memorial Prize (Prague Conference on Political Economy 2009)
- Website: http://www.hanshoppe.com

Hans-Hermann Hoppe (/ˈhɒpə/; German: [ˈhɔpə]; born 2 September 1949) is a German-American philosopher and economist associated with Austrian School economics, anarcho-capitalism, right-wing libertarianism, paleolibertarianism, and opposition to democracy. From 1986 until 2008 he was professor of economics at the University of Nevada, Las Vegas (UNLV). He was a senior fellow of the Mises Institute think tank until being removed in April 2026. In 2006 he emigrated to Turkey and founded the Property and Freedom Society.

Hoppe has written extensive criticisms of democracy, notably in his 2001 book Democracy: The God That Failed. The book favors exclusionary covenant communities that are "founded for the purpose of protecting family and kin". A section of the book favoring exclusion of democrats and homosexuals from society helped popularize Hoppe on the far-right. Some of the speakers invited at his Property and Freedom Society conferences in Turkey have been white nationalists.

Hoppe was a protégé of Murray Rothbard, who established him at UNLV, where Hoppe taught from 1986 to 2008. In 2004, a student's complaint about Hoppe's lecture comments regarding homosexuals and time preference led to an investigation and non-disciplinary letter to Hoppe by UNLV, which was subsequently withdrawn after a controversy over academic freedom.

At the September 2026 PFS meeting, Hoppe made comments about the Holocaust that scholars such as philosopher Matt Zwolinski from Bleeding Heart Libertarians have described as Holocaust denial.

== Early life and education ==
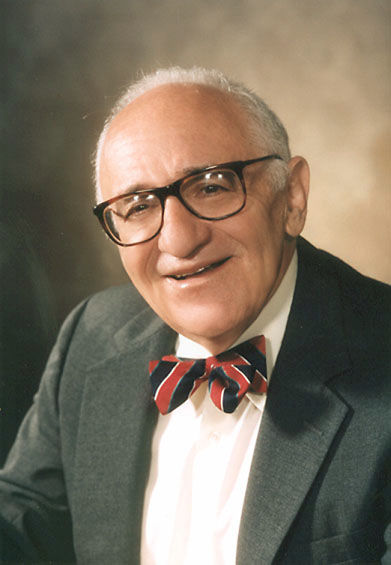
Murray Rothbard, whom Hoppe called his mentor and master

Hoppe was born in 1949 in Peine, West Germany. His parents had settled there in 1946 after fleeing from East Elbia, which after World War II came under Soviet occupation. He has stated the expropriation of his mother's family who were East Elbean Junkers has been a lasting trauma.

Hoppe completed his undergraduate studies at Saarland University and received his MA and PhD degrees in philosophy from Goethe University Frankfurt. He studied under Jürgen Habermas, a leading German intellectual of the post-WWII era, but came to reject Habermas's ideas and European leftism generally.

He was a post-doctoral fellow at the University of Michigan, in Ann Arbor, from 1976 to 1978 and earned his habilitation in Foundations of Sociology and Economics from the University of Frankfurt in 1981.

== Career ==
From 1981 to 1985 he taught in West Germany and Italy. In 1986 Hoppe came to the United States through Murray Rothbard on a scholarship from the Center for Libertarian Studies, and Rothbard also established Hoppe at University of Nevada, Las Vegas. From 1986 until his retirement in 2008, Hoppe was a professor in the School of Business at University of Nevada, Las Vegas. He was a Distinguished Fellow of the Mises Institute, a libertarian think tank that is publisher of much of his work, until being removed in April 2026.

Hoppe has said that Rothbard was his "principal teacher, mentor and master". Hoppe said he was "working and living side-by-side with him, in constant and immediate personal contact," and said that from 1985 until Rothbard's 1995 death, he considered Rothbard his "dearest fatherly friend".

=== Mises Institute and John Randolph Club ===
The Mises Institute was founded in 1982 by Lew Rockwell, Burton Blumert, and Murray Rothbard, following a split between the Cato Institute and Rothbard, who had been one of the founders of the Cato Institute. After Rothbard's death in 1996, Hoppe was a leading anarcho-capitalist figure at the Mises Institute.

Hoppe was active in the John Randolph Club, a far-right alliance of paleolibertarians and paleoconservatives that was organized by Rothbard and associated with the Rockford Institute. The club was known for promoting secessionist and neo-Confederate views in the 1990s.

=== Property and Freedom Society ===
In 2006, Hoppe founded The Property and Freedom Society (PFS), with annual conferences in Bodrum, Turkey. It and the Mises Institute represent a paleolibertarian challenge to the Mont Pelerin Society and Atlas Network of think tanks. Figures of the European New Right and the American alt-right have attended PFS conferences. Quinn Slobodian and Dieter Plehwe describe Hoppe as a "racialist right-wing libertarian", and Slobodian writes that the conferences have included members of the former John Randolph Club along with "new advocates of stateless libertarianism and racial secession".

In 2011, on the fifth anniversary of PFS, Hoppe reflected on its goals: "On the one hand, positively, it was to explain and elucidate the legal, economic, cognitive and cultural requirements and features of a free, state-less natural order. On the other hand, negatively, it was to unmask the State and showcase it for what it really is: an institution run by gangs of murderers, plunderers and thieves, surrounded by willing executioners, propagandists, sycophants, crooks, liars, clowns, charlatans, dupes and useful idiots – an institution that dirties and taints everything it touches."

In 2016, Hoppe was criticized for inviting white nationalist speakers such as Jared Taylor and neo-Nazi Richard B. Spencer to speak at the PFS, where also venture capitalist Peter Thiel spoke. Describing the PFS, the Southern Poverty Law Center said in 2016 that "in Hoppe one can see the connection between the ultra-Libertarians and white nationalists". Intelligencer in 2017 described the annual PFS meeting as "Davos, but for racists". Slobodian wrote in 2023 that "prophets of racial and social breakdown share the stage with investment advisors and financial consultants" at the conferences.

== Views ==
=== On democracy ===
Hoppe's 2001 book Democracy: The God That Failed argues that democracy is a cause of civilizational decline. Passages in the book oppose universal suffrage and favor "natural elites". In the book, Hoppe blames democratic forms of government for various social and economic problems, and attributes democracy's failures to pressure groups which seek to increase government expenditures and regulations. Hoppe proposes alternatives and remedies, including secession, decentralization of government, and "complete freedom of contract, occupation, trade and migration". Hoppe argues that monarchy would preserve individual liberty more effectively than democracy. The book helped popularize Hoppe in the far-right, particularly a section of the book that called for the exclusion of political rivals.

Janek Wasserman writes that Hoppe "reimagined the Austrian legacy as one of authoritarianism, conservatism, antidemocracy, and anti-Enlightenment". Steven Horwitz called the approaches of Hoppe and his Mises Institute colleague Joseph Salerno "a fascist fist in a libertarian glove". The political scientist George Hawley writes that Hoppe "may be the most important bridge between libertarianism and the Alt-Right". Hawley notes that Hoppe has argued "libertarians must actually be radical conservatives", and that libertarians must favor a right to discrimination, including on the basis of race.

In Hoppe's view, Wasserman writes, "the successes of the fin-de-siecle age—and the Austrian school—were not the product of liberal predominance or cosmopolitan virtues but of the ancien régime and its restrictive social order". Regarding democracy and the arts, Hoppe argued in 2013 that "democracy leads to the subversion and ultimately disappearance of the notion of beauty and universal standards of beauty. Beauty is swamped and submerged by so-called 'modern art'."

Reviewing Democracy: The God That Failed, Walter Block, a colleague of Hoppe's at the Mises Institute, wrote that Hoppe's arguments shed light "on historical occurrences, from wars to poverty to inflation to interest rates to crime". While Hoppe concedes that 21st-century democracies are more prosperous than the monarchies of old, Hoppe argues that if nobles and kings replaced today's political leaders, their ability to take a long-term view of a country's well-being would "improve matters", Block wrote. Block shared what he called minor criticisms of Hoppe's theses regarding time preferences, immigration and the gap between libertarianism and conservatism.

Alberto Benegas-Lynch Jr., a professor of economics at the University of Buenos Aires who is associated with the libertarian Cato Institute, criticized Hoppe's thesis that monarchy is preferable to democracy. Benegas-Lynch provided evidence that modern monarchies tend to be far poorer than modern democracies. In response, Hoppe argued that comparing mostly African monarchies with mostly European democracies led to a distortion.

Asked by The Intercept in 2021 about his incorporation into far-right internet memes celebrating political murder, Hoppe responded that the question was ignorant, writing, "I have been an intellectual champion of private property right, free markets, freedom of contract and association, and peace", and, "What do I know? There are lots of crazy people out there!"

=== Covenant communities and discrimination ===
In Democracy: The God That Failed, Hoppe argues in favor of property owners' right to establish communities with exclusive criteria for admission and acceptance. Hoppe describes a society of covenant communities made up of residents who have signed an agreement defining the nature of that community. Hoppe believes that these covenant communities should have the right to certain forms of discrimination, including the physical separation of people whose lifestyle is deemed incompatible with the norms of that community. He writes that "There would be little or no 'tolerance' and 'openmindedness' so dear to left-libertarians. Instead, one would be on the right path toward restoring the freedom of association and exclusion implied in the institution of private property".

Hoppe writes: "In a covenant concluded among proprietor and community tenants for the purpose of protecting their private property, no such thing as a right to free (unlimited) speech exists, ... naturally no one is permitted to advocate ideas contrary to the very purpose of the covenant of preserving and protecting private property, such as democracy and communism. There can be no tolerance toward democrats and communists in a libertarian social order. They will have to be physically separated and expelled from society. Likewise, in a covenant founded for the purpose of protecting family and kin, there can be no tolerance toward those habitually promoting lifestyles incompatible with this goal. They – the advocates of alternative, non-family and kin-centered lifestyles such as, for instance, individual hedonism, parasitism, nature-environment worship, homosexuality, or communism – will have to be physically removed from society, too, if one is to maintain a libertarian order."

Commenting on this passage, Martin Snyder of the American Association of University Professors said Hoppe's words will disturb "[t]hose with a better memory than Hoppe for segregation, apartheid, internment facilities and concentration camps, for yellow stars and pink triangles". Walter Block describes Hoppe as calling for homosexuals and others to be banned from polite society, and says of Hoppe's statement: "it is stark, it is well written, it is radical...it is still exceedingly difficult to reconcile with libertarianism."

Critics such as Phillip Magness have argued that Hoppe's cultural conservative views were not derived from Mises's Austrian economics, but rather from outside philosophical traditions such as other right-wing political thought and the Frankfurt School.

=== Support for immigration restrictions ===
Although a self-described anarcho-capitalist who favors abolishing the nation-state, Hoppe also garners controversy due to his support for governmental enforcement of immigration laws, which critics argue is at odds with libertarianism and anarcho-capitalism. Hoppe argues that as long as states exist, they should impose some restrictions on immigration. He has equated free immigration to "forced integration" which violates the rights of native peoples, since if land were privately owned, immigration would not be unhindered but would only occur with the consent of private property owners.

Hoppe's Mises Institute colleague Walter Block has characterized Hoppe as an "anti-open immigration activist" who argues that, though all public property is "stolen" by the state from taxpayers, "the state compounds the injustice when it allows immigrants to use [public] property, thus further "invading" the private property rights of the original owners". However, Block rejects Hoppe's views as incompatible with libertarianism. He argues that Hoppe's logic implies that flagrantly unlibertarian laws such as regulations on prostitution and drug use "could be defended on the basis that many tax-paying property owners would not want such behavior on their own private property". Another libertarian author, Simon Guenzl, writing for Libertarian Papers, argues that: "supporting a legitimate role for the state as an immigration gatekeeper is inconsistent with Rothbardian and Hoppean libertarian anarchism, as well as with the associated strategy of advocating always and in every instance reductions in the state's role in society."

In terms of specific immigration restrictions, Hoppe argued that an appropriate policy will require immigrants to the United States to display proficiency in English in addition to "superior (above-average) intellectual performance and character structure as well as a compatible system of values". He suggested that these criteria would lead to a "systematic pro-European immigration bias". Jacob Hornberger of the Future of Freedom Foundation argued that the immigration test Hoppe advocated would probably be prejudiced against Latin American immigrants to the United States.

=== Remarks about homosexuals and academic investigation ===
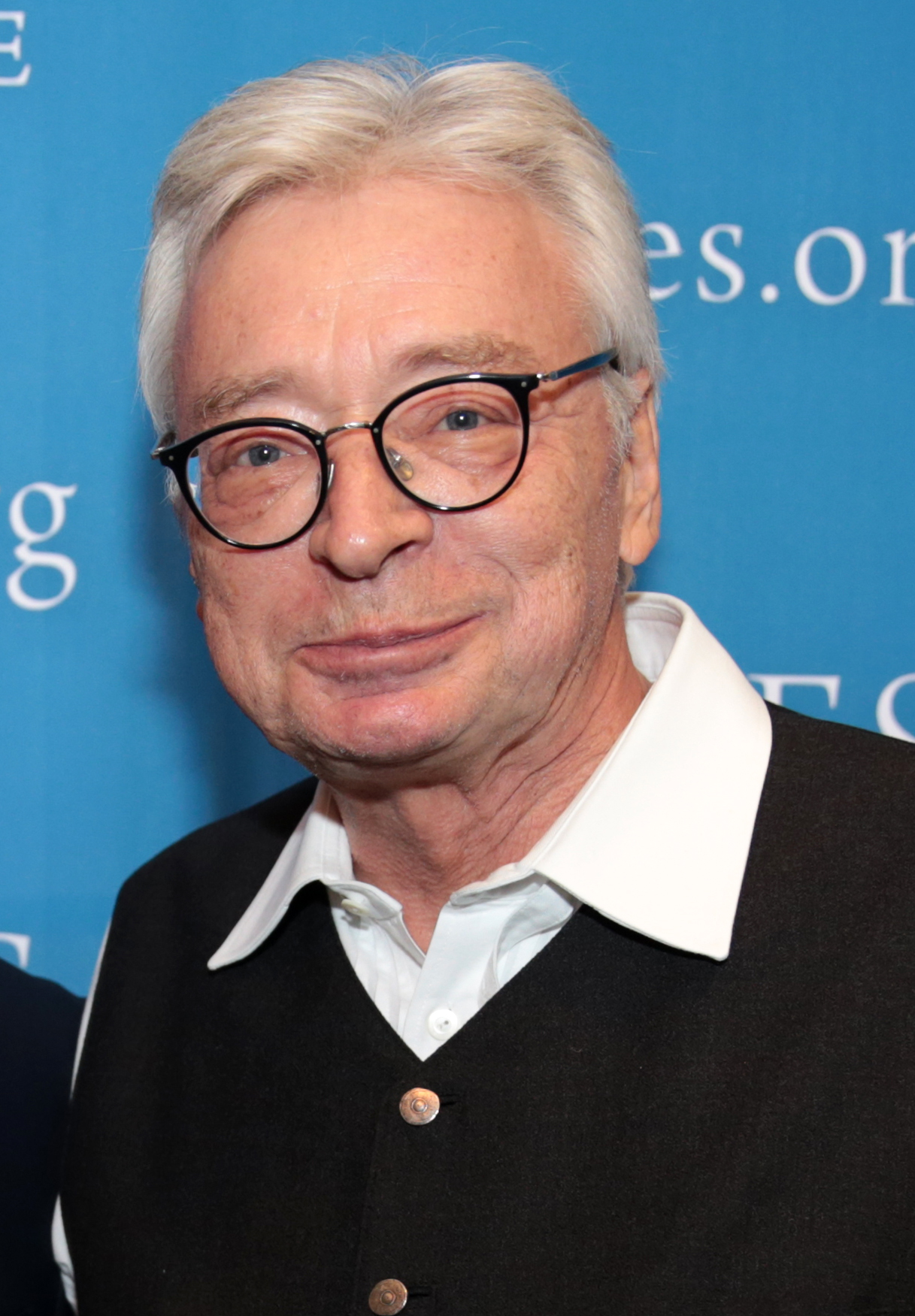
Hoppe at an event in New York City in 2017

Hoppe's statements concerning race and homosexuality have provoked controversy. In a 4 March 2004, lecture on time preference at the University of Nevada, Las Vegas (UNLV), he stated that homosexuals tend to be more shortsighted than heterosexuals in their ability to save and plan economically (in part because they tend not to have children), suggested that John Maynard Keynes's homosexuality might explain his economic views, and that very young, very old, and childless people, are generally less future-oriented. Hoppe later said the comments lasted only about 90 seconds of a 75-minute class and that he had given similar lectures for 18 years without prior complaint. After a student complaint and ensuing request from the university, Hoppe apologized to the class, comparing the remarks to cultural generalizations about food preferences. The student then filed a formal complaint alleging Hoppe did not take it the apology seriously.

An investigation followed. In February 2005, UNLV provost Raymond W. Alden III issued Hoppe a non-disciplinary letter of instruction finding that he had "created a hostile or intimidating educational environment in violation of the University's policies regarding discrimination as to sexual orientation". The letter also instructed Hoppe to "... cease mischaracterizing opinion as objective fact".

Hoppe appealed with assistance from the American Civil Liberties Union, which threatened legal action and defended academic freedom. Alden's decision was picked up by Fox News and several blogs and libertarians organized a campaign to contact the university. The university received two weeks of bad publicity and the Interim Chancellor (Nevada System of Higher Education) Jim Rogers expressed concerns about "any attempts to thwart free speech".

UNLV President Carol Harter acted upon Hoppe's appeal on 18 February 2005, deciding that Hoppe's views, even if non-mainstream or controversial, should not be cause for reprimanding him. She dismissed the discrimination complaint against Hoppe, and the non-disciplinary letter was withdrawn from Hoppe's personnel file. She wrote, "In the balance between freedoms and responsibilities, and where there may be ambiguity between the two, academic freedom must, in the end, be foremost."

Hoppe later wrote about the incident and the UNLV investigation in an article entitled "My Battle With the Thought Police". Martin Snyder of the American Association of University Professors wrote that he should not be "punished for freely expressing his opinions".

Various controversies about academic freedom, including the Hoppe matter and remarks made by Harvard University President Lawrence Summers, prompted the University of Nevada, Las Vegas, to hold a conference on academic freedom in October 2005. In 2009 UNLV proposed a new policy that included the encouragement of reporting by people who felt that they had encountered bias. The proposed policy was criticized by the Nevada ACLU and some faculty members who remembered the Hoppe incident as adverse to academic freedom.

=== Holocaust denial ===
At the September 2026 PFS meeting, Hoppe made comments downplaying the evidence of the Holocaust.

They [Europeans] compare what happens to Gaza and then, the so-called Holocaust, as far as the Holocaust is concerned, if you deny the teeniest detail in the official narrative of the Holocaust in Germany, you will be jailed. […] But if you study these things a little bit more closely—again I learned that all from Rothbard too—there are huge holes in the story. There are lots of lies mixed into certain things that are undoubtedly true. There were never forensic investigations done in these places.

Scholars such as philosopher Matt Zwolinski from Bleeding Heart Libertarians have described these comments as constituting Holocaust denial.

== Argumentation ethics ==
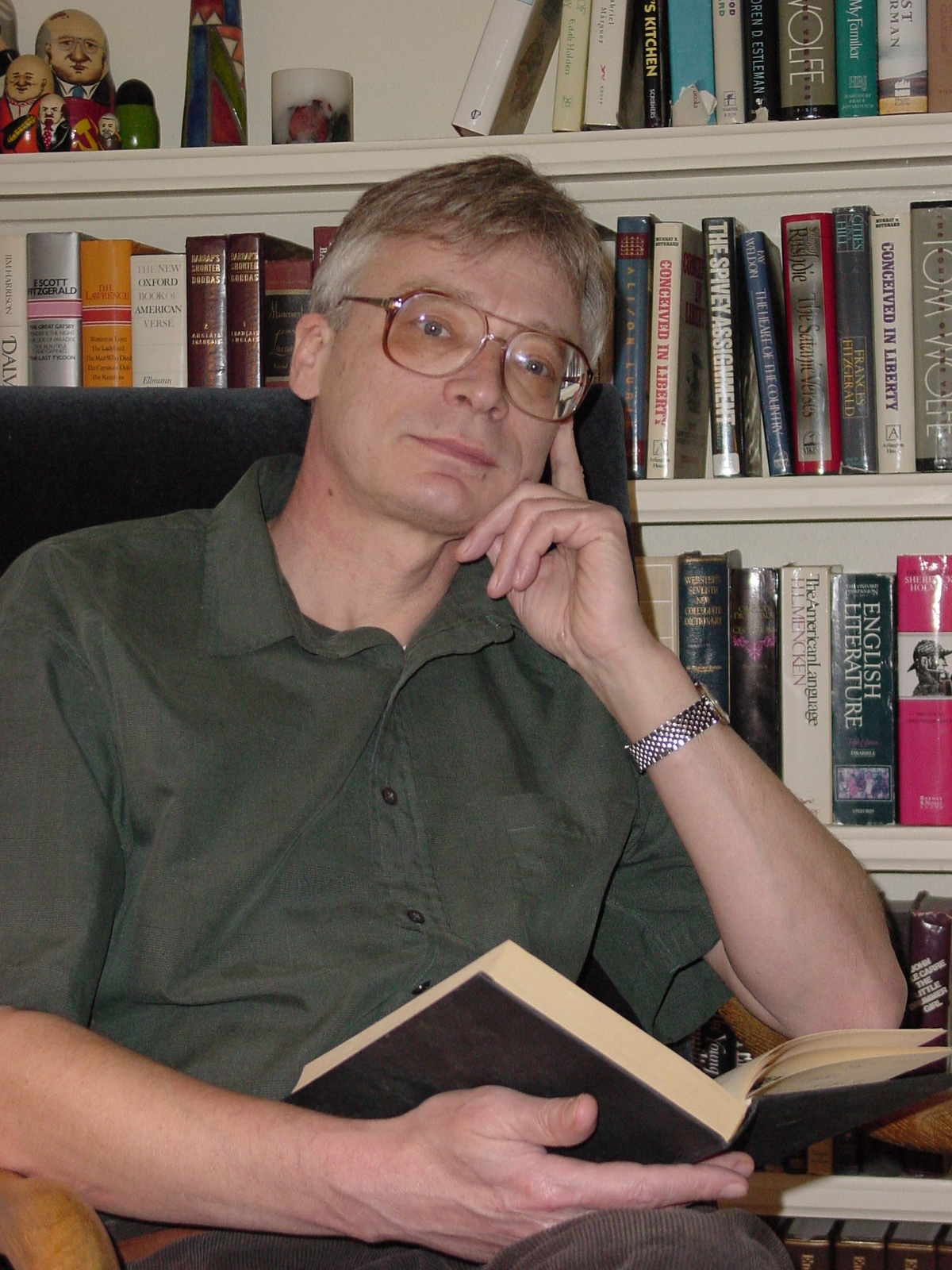
Hoppe in 2005

In the September 1988 issue of Liberty, Hoppe attempted to establish an a priori and value-neutral justification for libertarian ethics by devising a new theory which he named argumentation ethics. Hoppe asserted that any argument which in any respect purports to contradict libertarian principles is logically incoherent.

Hoppe argued that, in the course of having an argument about politics (or indeed any subject), people assume certain norms of argumentation, including a prohibition on initiating violence. Hoppe then extrapolated this argument to political life in general, arguing that the norms governing argumentation should apply in all political contexts. Hoppe claimed that, of all political philosophies, only anarcho-capitalist libertarianism prohibits the initiation of aggressive violence (the non-aggression principle); therefore, any argument for any political philosophy other than anarcho-capitalist libertarianism is logically incoherent.

In the following issue, Liberty published comments by ten libertarians, followed by a rejoinder from Hoppe. In his comment for Liberty, Hoppe's friend and Mises Institute supervisor Murray Rothbard wrote that Hoppe's theory was "a dazzling breakthrough for political philosophy in general and for libertarianism in particular" and that Hoppe "has managed to transcend the famous is/ought, fact/value dichotomy that has plagued philosophy since the days of the Scholastics, and that had brought modern libertarianism into a tiresome deadlock". However, the majority of Hoppe's colleagues surveyed by Liberty rejected his theory. In his response, Hoppe derided his critics as "utilitarians".

Mises Institute Senior Fellow Roderick T. Long stated that Hoppe's a priori formulation of libertarianism denied the fundamental principle of Misesean praxeology. On the issue of utilitarianism, Long wrote, "Hoppe's argument, if it worked, would commit us to recognizing and respecting libertarian rights regardless of what our goals are – but as a praxeologist, I have trouble seeing how any practical requirement can be justified apart from a means-end structure." Libertarian philosopher Jason Brennan rejected Hoppe's argument, saying, "Hoppe's argument illicitly conflates a liberty right with a claim right, and so fails."

J. Mikael Olsson argued that Hoppe had not provided any non-circular reasons why we "have to regard moral values as something that must be regarded as being established through (consensual) argument instead of 'mere' subjective preferences for situations turning out in certain ways". In other words, the theory relies "on the existence [of] certain intuitions, the acceptance of which cannot itself be the result of 'value-free' reasoning."

According to commentators, his original appropriation theory based on argumentation ethics initially tended toward the labor theory of property, but later moved toward the first possession theory of property perspective.

== Influence ==
Hoppe was an influence on the neoreactionary monarchist blogger Curtis Yarvin, also known by the pen name Mencius Moldbug.

Javier Milei, the president of Argentina, has cited Hoppe as one of his major influences and has recommended his bibliography in the past, despite recent grievances between both about the ideologic purity of Milei's administration and the praxis for a libertarian on a democratic system.

== Personal life ==
Hoppe resides in Turkey with his wife Gülçin Imre Hoppe, an Austrian school economist and hotelier. According to her, she comes from a family of medical doctors and she studied economic theory in 2003 at University of Istanbul and became a Misesian. In 2006, Hoppe left Las Vegas and they "started a life together". As of 2024, their patchwork family consisted of four children and seven grandchildren. A daughter, Emily, lives with her husband and children in California, while his son Nick moved to Austria in 2019 with his wife and two daughters.

Ther PFS Congress series takes place at their family-owned hotel, the Karia Princess in Bodrum.

== Selected works ==
=== Books (authored) ===
German

- Handeln und Erkennen [Action and Cognition] (in German). Bern (1976). ISBN 978-3261019004. OCLC 2544452.
- Kritik der kausalwissenschaftlichen Sozialforschung [Critique of Causal Scientific Social Research] (in German). Opladen: Westdeutscher Verlag (1983). ISBN 978-3531116242. OCLC 10432202.
- Eigentum, Anarchie und Staat Property, Anarchy, and the State (in German). Opladen: Westdeutscher Verlag (1987). ISBN 978-3531118116. OCLC 18226538.

English

- A Theory of Socialism and Capitalism. Kluwer Academic Publishers (1988). ISBN 0898382793. Archived from the original. Audiobook narrated by Jim Vann.
- Economic Science and the Austrian Method. Auburn, AL: Ludwig von Mises Institute (1995). ISBN 094546620X. Audiobook, narrated by Gennady Stolyarov II.
- Democracy: The God That Failed: The Economics and Politics of Monarchy, Democracy and Natural Order. New Brunswick, NJ: Transaction Publishers (2001). ISBN 0765808684. OCLC 46384089.
- The Economics and Ethics of Private Property. Auburn, AL: Ludwig von Mises Institute, 2006. [2nd ed.] ISBN 0945466404.
- Economy, Society, & History. Auburn, AL: Mises Institute, 2021.

=== Books (edited) ===
- The Myth of National Defense: Essays on the Theory and History of Security Production. Ludwig von Mises Institute (2003). ISBN 978-0945466376. OCLC 53401048.

=== Book contributions ===
- "Introduction." [1998]. In: The Ethics of Liberty, by Murray N. Rothbard. New York University Press (1998). ISBN 978-1610166645. Audiobook available.
- "Government and the Private Production of Defense." In: The Myth of National Defense: Essays on the Theory and History of Security Production. Auburn, AL: Ludwig von Mises Institute (2003), pp. 335–368. ISBN 978-0945466376. OCLC 53401048. Audiobook narrated by George Pickering.

=== Articles ===
- "On the Ultimate Justification of the Ethics of Private Property." Liberty, vol. 2, no. 1 (September 1988): 20–22.
- "Symposium: Breakthrough or Buncombe?" Liberty, vol. 2, no. 2 (November 1988): 44–54. Symposium proceedings featuring Murray N. Rothbard, D. Friedman, L. Yeager, D. Gordon and D. Rasmussen.
- "Socialism: A Property or Knowledge Problem?" Review of Austrian Economics, vol. 9 (March 1996): 143–149. doi:10.1007/BF01101888.
- "Small is Beautiful and Efficient: The Case for Secession." Telos, vol. 107 (Spring 1996).
- "The Libertarian Case for Free Trade and Restricted Immigration." Journal of Libertarian Studies, vol. 13, no. 2 (Summer 1998). Center for Libertarian Studies.
- "On Property and Exploitation," with Walter Block. International Journal of Value-Based Management, vol. 15 (2002): 225–236.
- "My Battle with the Thought Police." Mises Daily (12 April 2005). Ludwig von Mises Institute.

=== Book reviews ===
- "In Defense of Extreme Rationalism: Thoughts on D. McCloskey's The Rhetoric of Economics." Review of The Rhetoric of Economics by Donald McCloskey. Review of Austrian Economics, vol. 3 (1989): 179–214.

=== Collected works ===
- Jacob, Thomas (editor). Hoppe Unplugged: Ansichten, Einsichten und Provokationen aus Interviews und Reden von Prof. Hans-Hermann Hoppe [in German]. Hamburg: tredition GmbH (2021). Online supplement. "Views, insights and provocations from interviews and speeches by Prof. Hans-Hermann Hoppe."

== See also ==
- Anti-democratic thought
- Argumentation theory
- Austrian School of Economics
- Criticism of democracy
- Dark Enlightenment
- Dialectic
- Market anarchism
- Propertarianism
- Right-libertarianism
- Soft despotism
- Totalitarian democracy
- Tyranny of the majority
- Voluntaryism
