= Stephan Kinsella =

American lawyer

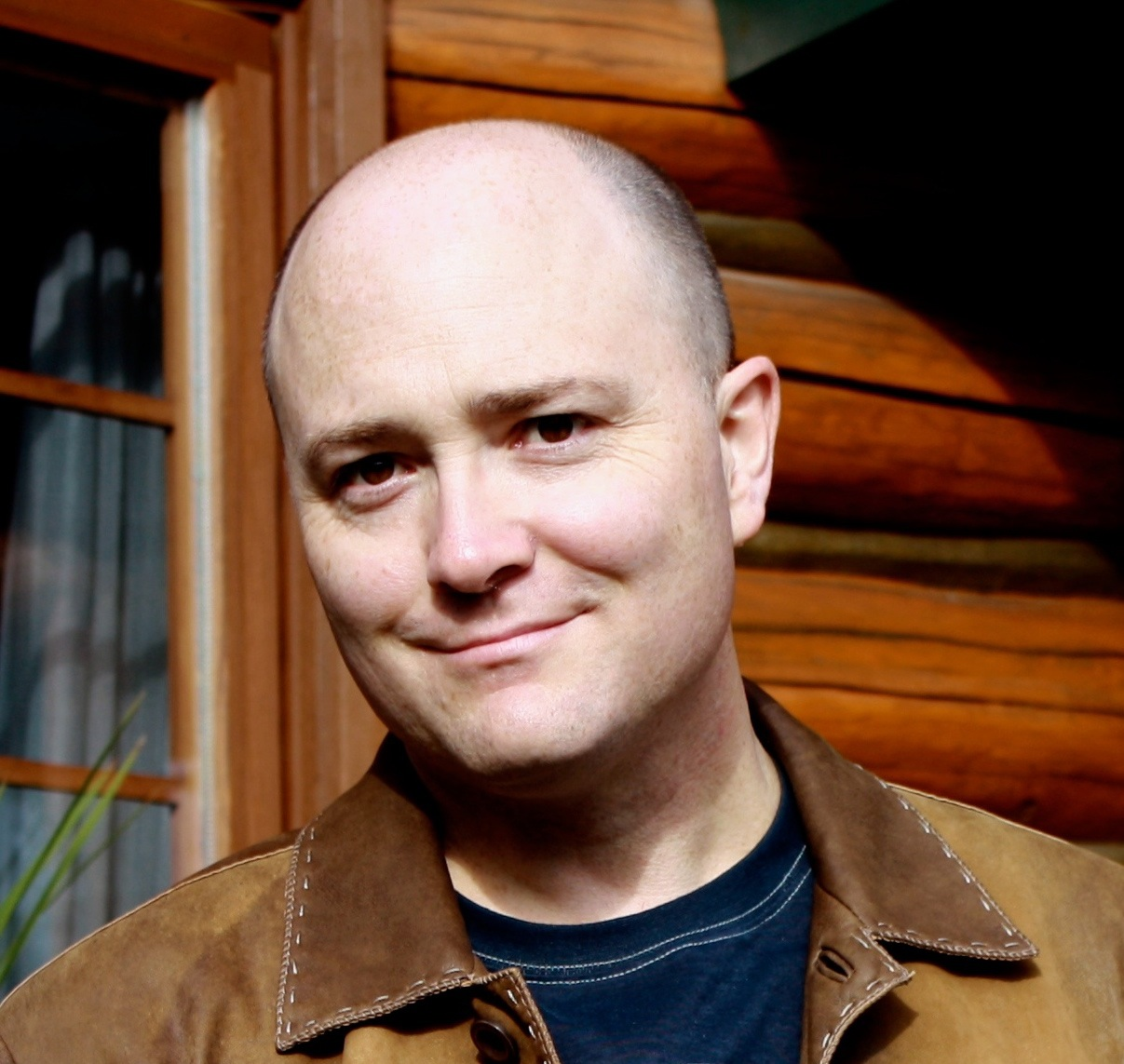
- Born: Norman Stephan Kinsella; 1965 (age 60–61); Prairieville, Louisiana, U.S.
- Education: Louisiana State University (BS, MS, JD); King's College London (LLM)
- Occupation: Attorney

Member of the Libertarian Party Judicial Committee
- Incumbent
- Assumed office May 29, 2022
- Website: Official website

Norman Stephan Kinsella (/kɪnˈsɛlə/; born 1965) is a retired American patent attorney, author, and anarcho-capitalist. His legal works have been published by Oxford University Press, Oceana Publications, Mises Institute, Quid Pro Books and others.

== Education ==
Born in Prairieville, Louisiana, he attended Louisiana State University where he earned Bachelor of Science (BS) and Master of Science (MS) degrees in electrical engineering, and a Juris Doctor (JD) from the Paul M. Hebert Law Center (formerly known as LSU Law Center). He also obtained an LL.M. at King's College London.

== Personal life ==
Stephan Kinsella is married to Cindy DeLaney. They have been married for approximately forty years as of 2025. They have a son named Ethan.

== Career ==
Kinsella was general counsel of Applied Optoelectronics, Inc., of Sugar Land, Texas from 2000 to 2012 and was in private practice in Houston, Texas. He was formerly an adjunct scholar of the Ludwig von Mises Institute, a right-libertarian think-tank for the promotion of Rothbardian political thought and the Austrian School of economics, where he was Book Review Editor for the Journal of Libertarian Studies and a faculty member of the Mises Academy. Kinsella also founded the Center for the Study of Innovative Freedom (C4SIF) of which he currently is the Director. In May 2022 he was elected to the Libertarian Party Judicial Committee, but was subsequently disqualified due to being two months short of the 4 year Libertarian Party membership requirement to hold the office. As of August 2022, he is eligible and it's believed that he'll be able to be appointed by the LP Judicial Committee to fill the vacancy caused by his ineligible run in May 2022.

== Views ==
Kinsella is a strong opponent of intellectual property, arguing that patents and copyrights should not form part of a proper libertarian law code. He is a proponent of Hans-Hermann Hoppe's theory on argumentation ethics. He is an atheist, having previously been a devout Catholic.

=== Books ===
- International Investment, Political Risk, and Dispute Resolution: A Practitioner's Guide, Second Edition (Oxford University Press, 2020) (with Noah D. Rubins and Thomas N. Papanastasiou)
- Louisiana Civil Law Dictionary (Quid Pro Books, 2011) (with Gregory Rome)
- Law in a Libertarian World: Legal Foundations of a Free Society (Papinian Press, 2021)
- Protecting Foreign Investment Under International Law: Legal Aspects of Political Risk. Dobbs Ferry, N.Y.: Oceana Publications. 1997. ISBN 978-0-379213-71-3. (with Paul E. Comeaux)
- Online Contract Formation. Dobbs Ferry, N.Y.: Oceana Publications. 2004. ISBN 978-0-379215-19-9. OCLC 56476041, 744522102. (with Andrew F. Simpson)
- Against Intellectual Property. Ludwig von Mises Institute. 2008. ISBN 978-1-933550-32-9.
- Trademark practice and Forms. New York, N.Y.: Oceana Publications. 2003. ISBN 978-0-379012-69-9. OCLC 772536840, 636178826. (with Teresa C. Tucker, co-editor)

=== Articles ===
- Symposium: "Do patents and copyrights undermine private property?" by Ilana Mercer, Stephan Kinsella, and James DeLong (Insight on the News, 21 May 2001)
- Against Intellectual Property (Journal of Libertarian Studies, Spring 2001) [Volume 15, no. 2, p. 1–53]
