= H. B. Acton =

English political philosopher (1908–1974)

Harold Burrows Acton
- Born: 2 June 1908; London, England, United Kingdom of Great Britain and Ireland
- Died: 16 June 1974 (aged 66); Edinburgh, Scotland, United Kingdom

Philosophical work
- Era: 20th-century philosophy
- Region: Western philosophy
- School: Libertarianism

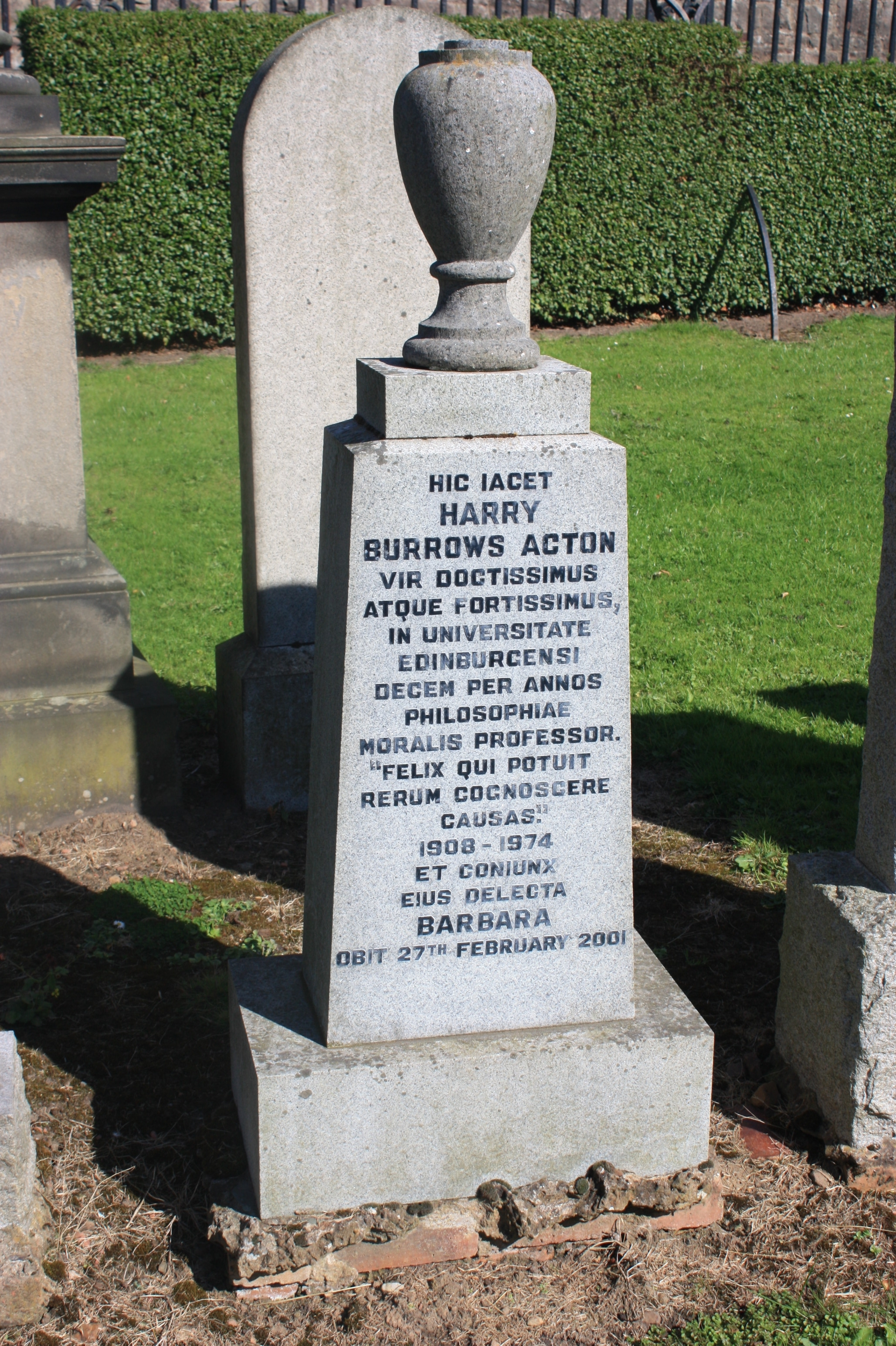
The grave of H B Acton, Grange Cemetery, Edinburgh

Harold Burrows Acton (2 June 1908 – 16 June 1974) was an English academic in the field of political philosophy, known for books defending the morality of capitalism, and attacking Marxism-Leninism. He in particular produced arguments on the incoherence of Marxism, which he described as a 'farrago' (in philosophical terms). His book The Illusion of the Epoch, in which this appears, is a standard point of reference. Other interests were the Marquis de Condorcet, Hegel, John Stuart Mill, Herbert Spencer, F. H. Bradley, Bernard Bosanquet and Sidney Webb. Acton also endorsed a version of negative utilitarianism, according to which the reduction of suffering has unique moral importance.

'Harry' Acton held teaching positions at University College, Swansea, Bedford College and the University of Edinburgh where he occupied the Chair of Moral Philosophy. He was editor of Philosophy, the journal of the Royal Institute of Philosophy, of which he was for a time Director. He was president of the Aristotelian Society from 1952 to 1953.

He is buried in Grange Cemetery in Edinburgh close to the main entrance.

== Works ==
- The Illusion of the Epoch: Marxism-Leninism as a Philosophical Creed (1955)
- The Philosophy of Language in Revolutionary France (1959) Dawes Hicks Lecture of the British Academy
- What Marx Really Said (1967)
- Philosophy of Punishment (1969) editor
- Kant's moral philosophy (1970)
- The Morals of Markets: an Ethical Exploration (1971) essays edited by David Gordon and Jeremy Shearmur. 2nd edition (1993), Liberty Fund, ISBN 978-0-86597-106-6
- The Right to Work and the Right to Strike (1972)
- The ethics of capitalism (The Company and its Responsibilities) (1972)
- The idea of a spiritual power: 1973 Auguste Comte memorial trust lecture (1974)
