= Burton Blumert =

American writer, publisher, and coin dealer (1929–2009)

Burton S. Blumert
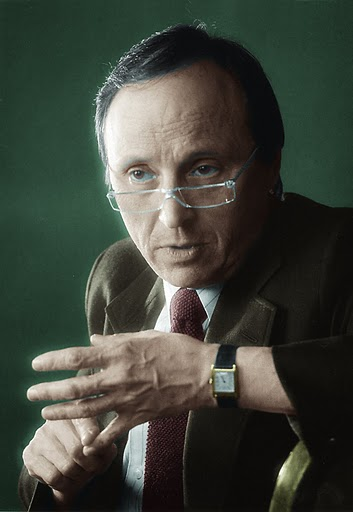
- Born: February 11, 1929; Brooklyn, New York
- Died: March 30, 2009 (aged 80)
- Citizenship: American
- Education: New York University
- Occupations: Writer, publisher, investment advisor
- Writing career
- Notable works: Bagels, Barry Bonds, and Rotten Politicians

Burton S. Blumert (/ˈbluːmərt/; February 11, 1929 – March 30, 2009) was the president of the Center for Libertarian Studies in Burlingame, California, co-founder and chairman of the Mises Institute, and the publisher of LewRockwell.com. In a career that spanned almost 50 years until his retirement in 2008, he bought and sold precious metals as the proprietor of Camino Coin Company.

== Background ==
Educated at New York University, Blumert had a series of draft deferments and then enlisted in the United States Air Force during the Korean War era.

From 1959 until 2008, Blumert operated the Camino Coin Company, dealing in bullion and coins. Upon retirement he gave the company to a long-time employee. After retiring, Blumert remained an active discussant of commodities topics in the media.

Blumert was Jewish.

== Political and social commentary ==
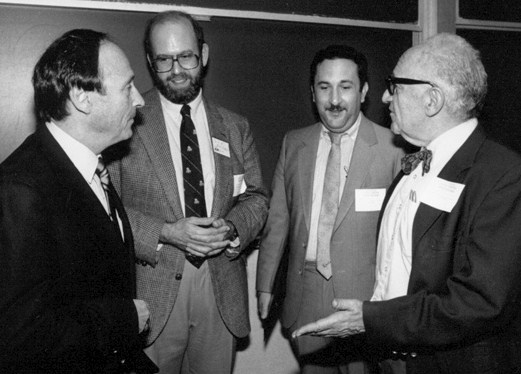
Blumert with Lew Rockwell, economist and philosopher David Gordon, and Murray Rothbard

In a 2008 interview he credited his experience in the coin industry as spurring him to adopt a libertarian political philosophy and to support fellow gold advocate Ron Paul. In 1988, Blumert was chairman of Ron Paul's first presidential campaign. Blumert was a close friend and supporter of the late Murray Rothbard, with whom he founded the Center for Libertarian Studies in 1975. As president of the Center for Libertarian Studies, Blumert published the Journal of Libertarian Studies, the Austrian Economics Newsletter, and the Rothbard-Rockwell Report. Blumert served as chairman of the Ludwig von Mises Institute and was publisher of LewRockwell.com (LRC).
