= The Review of Austrian Economics =

- Discipline: Economics
- Language: English
- Edited by: Peter J. Boettke, Christopher J. Coyne

Publication details
- History: 1987–present
- Publisher: Springer Science+Business Media
- Frequency: Quarterly

Standard abbreviations
- ISO 4: Rev. Austrian Econ.

Indexing
- CODEN: RAECFG
- ISSN: 0889-3047 (print); 1573-7128 (web)
- LCCN: 87654025
- OCLC no.: 754654163

Links
- Journal homepage; Online archive

The Review of Austrian Economics is a peer-reviewed academic journal published by Springer Science+Business Media. It was established by Murray Rothbard, who edited ten volumes between 1987 and 1997. After his death, Walter Block, Hans-Hermann Hoppe, and Joseph T. Salerno edited the journal for two years. It was published by Lexington Books and later by Kluwer Academic Publishers. The Ludwig von Mises Institute then replaced the journal with the Quarterly Journal of Austrian Economics.

The review is now affiliated with George Mason University. In 1999, it continued publication with volume 11. The editors-in-chief are Peter J. Boettke and Christopher J. Coyne (George Mason University).
