= Walter Block =

American born Austrian school economist (born 1941)

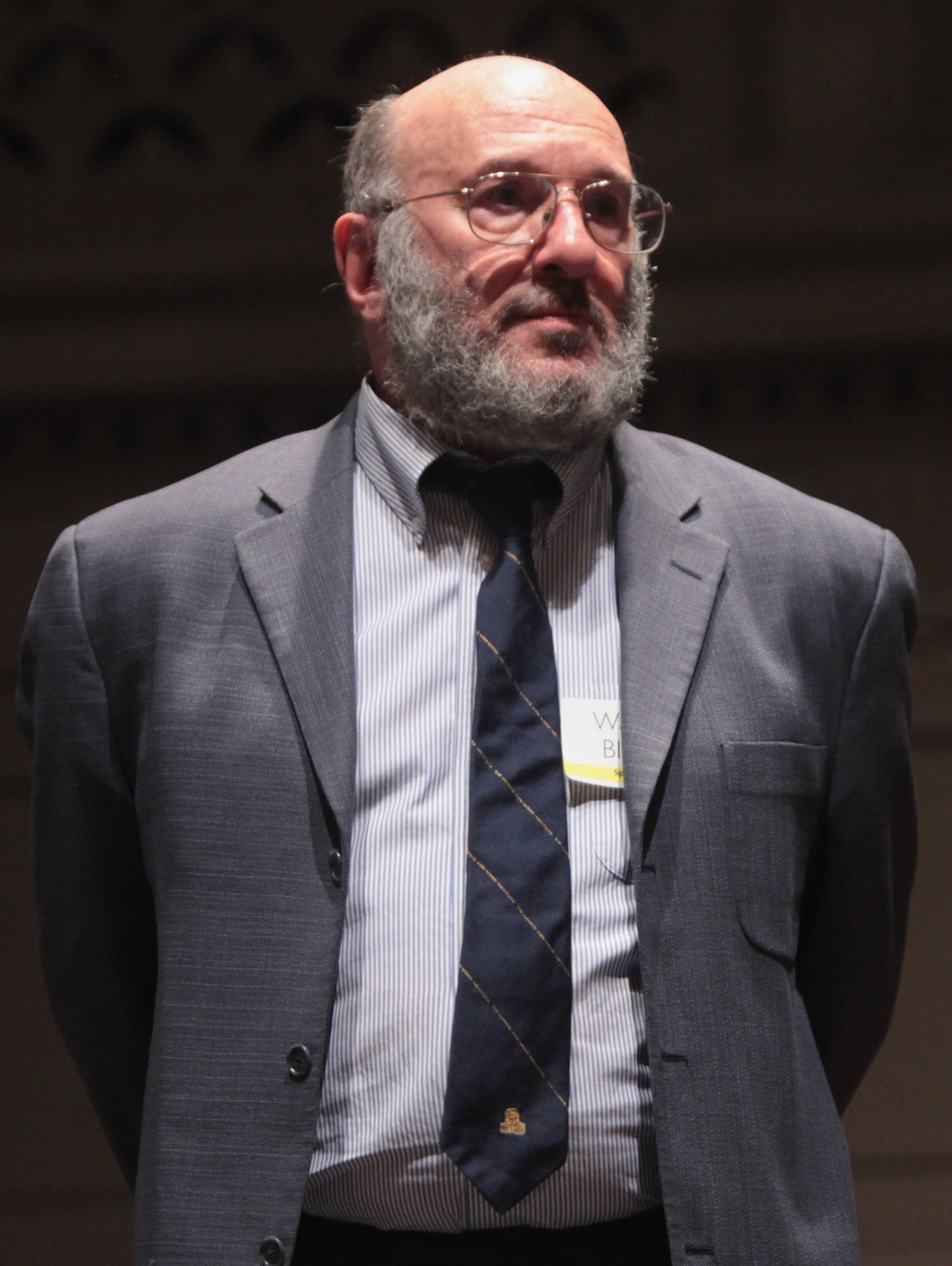
- Block speaking in 2016
- Born: Walter Edward Block; August 21, 1941 (age 85); New York City, U.S.

Academic background
- Education: Brooklyn College (BA); Columbia University (PhD)
- Doctoral advisor: Gary Becker, William Landes
- Influences: Ludwig von Mises, Murray Rothbard, Ayn Rand, Milton Friedman, Friedrich Hayek, Hans-Hermann Hoppe, Ron Paul, Lew Rockwell, H.L. Mencken

Academic work
- Discipline: Political economy, environmental economics, transport economics, political philosophy
- School or tradition: Austrian school of economics
- Notable ideas: Evictionism; Blockean Proviso (see below)

Signature
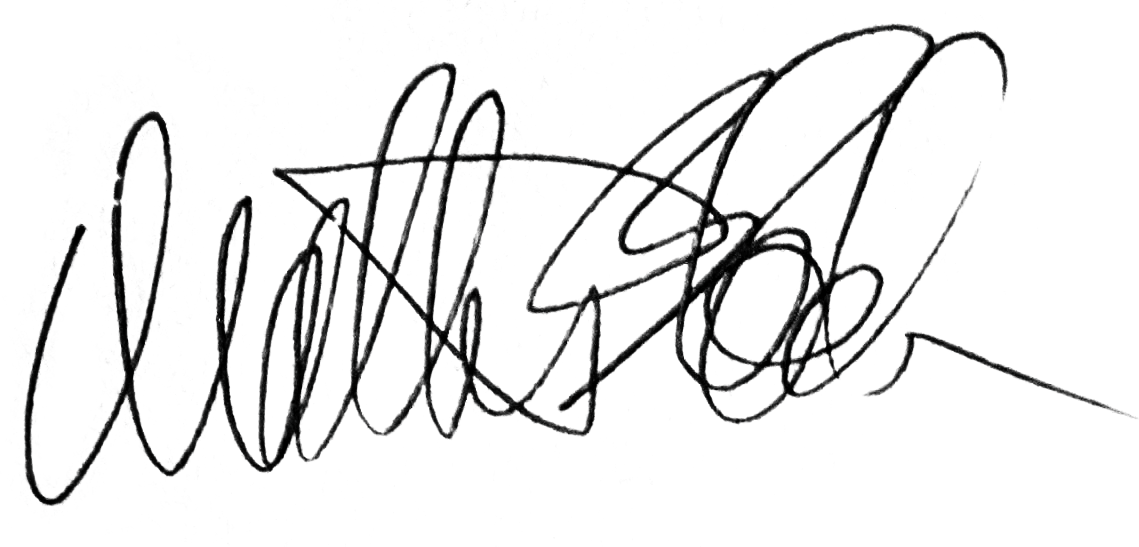

Walter Edward Block (born August 21, 1941) is an American Austrian school economist and anarcho-capitalist theorist. He is the Harold E. Wirth Eminent Scholar Endowed Chair in Economics at the School of Business at Loyola University New Orleans and a former senior fellow of the non-profit think-tank Ludwig von Mises Institute in Auburn, Alabama.

== Personal life ==
Walter Block was born in Brooklyn, New York, to Jewish parents Abraham Block, a certified public accountant, and Ruth Block, a paralegal, both of whom Block has said were liberals. He attended James Madison High School, where Bernie Sanders was on his track team. Block earned his PhD degree in economics from Columbia University and wrote his dissertation on rent control in the United States under Gary Becker. Block identifies himself as a "devout atheist". He is also a Canadian citizen.

In an interview, Block stated, "In the fifties and sixties, I was just another commie living in Brooklyn." Block credits his shift to libertarianism to his having attended a lecture by Ayn Rand while he was an undergraduate student. Block later attended a luncheon with Rand, Nathaniel Branden, and Leonard Peikoff at which Branden suggested that Block read Atlas Shrugged by Ayn Rand and Economics in One Lesson by Henry Hazlitt. He says that the final push to his conversion came from having met Austrian School and anarcho-capitalist theorist Murray Rothbard. While Block is an anarcho-capitalist and, unlike the Objectivist followers of Ayn Rand, ultimately opposed to limited or minimal government, and even while criticizing her movement as "cultish", Block still describes himself as "a big fan" of Rand and considers Atlas Shrugged to be "the best novel ever written."

== Professional career ==
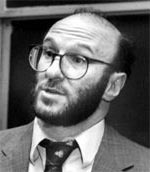
Portrait of Block

Walter Block received a B.A. in philosophy from Brooklyn College in 1964 and a PhD in economics from Columbia University in 1972. He taught at the University of Central Arkansas, Holy Cross College, Baruch College and Rutgers University. He now holds the Harold E. Wirth Eminent Scholar Endowed Chair in Economics at the Butt College of Business, Loyola University, in New Orleans.

From 1979 to 1991, Block was the senior economist with the Fraser Institute. He was also a senior fellow at the think-tank Ludwig von Mises Institute from 2000 to 2024, where he published various blog posts, papers, and books.

In the years since 1971, his work has been published in the Journal of Libertarian Studies, the Quarterly Journal of Austrian Economics, the Review of Austrian Economics, the American Journal of Economics and Sociology, the Journal of Labor Economics and Public Choice and in Psychology Today and other popular media. In 2017, he hit the milestone of publishing over 500 peer-reviewed articles. Block has reached almost eight hundred journal publications.

=== Books ===
Block has written thirty-three books. He is best known for his 1976 book Defending the Undefendable. The book has been translated into ten foreign languages. Fox Business Channel pundit John Stossel wrote that Block's "eye-opening" book inspired him to see that economics "illuminates what common sense overlooks."

== Viewpoints ==
=== Slavery and segregation ===
==== "Voluntary slave contract" ====
Block believes that people should have the legal right to sell themselves into slavery, or to buy and keep slaves who have sold themselves into slavery, in a libertarian legal order.

==== Slavery and civil rights in the United States ====
A January 2014 article in the New York Times said Block "suggested in an interview that the daily life of the enslaved was 'not so bad – you pick cotton and sing songs.'" The piece also reported that Block said Woolworth's had the right to exclude black people from its lunch counters, asserting that "no one is compelled to associate with people against their will." Block responded to the article by accusing the Times of libel for taking quotes out of context and claiming the latter quote was not accurate. In his response, he called slavery "depraved and monstrous" while arguing that it is not the nature of the work slaves perform that makes slavery monstrous, but rather it is the fact that they are forced to perform it and are not free to leave. According to Block's argument, forcing a slave to perform pleasant tasks would be no less monstrous because it equally violates the libertarian non-aggression principle. An Inside Higher Ed piece noted that, in response to the story, seventeen faculty members at Block's university publicly called for him to be censured for his "recurring public attacks ... on the civil rights of all." The piece also reported that Reverend Kevin Wildes, the President of Block's university, took the "unusual step" of publicly critiquing his arguments as fallacious. As part of a settlement to the lawsuit, The New York Times agreed to add the following Editor's Note to the article: "An earlier version of this article referred imprecisely to the views of Walter Block on slavery. While Mr. Block has said that the daily life of slaves was "not so bad," he opposes slavery because it is involuntary, and he believes reparations should be paid."

=== Pay gap for black people and women ===
In a 2008 lecture Block called "Injustices in the Politics and Economics of Social Justice" presented at the invitation of the Adam Smith Society of the economics department of Loyola College, Baltimore Block said "blacks and women" were paid less than whites because they are "less productive".

In the lecture, Block defended his views on women saying among younger and unmarried women, there is virtually no income disparity. When asked by an attendee to explain the difference in productivity between blacks and whites, he said that as an economist he was not qualified to explain the disparity. Block offered two thoughts that might account for the disparity: first, what he called the "politically correct" explanation, or socioeconomic disparities and historical injustices towards blacks; for the second thought, which he calls the "political incorrect", he refers to R. Herrnstein and C. Murray's book "The Bell Curve".

James Gill wrote in the Times-Picayune that the lecture "ignited a furor", resulting in the president of the university, Brian F. Linnane, apologizing for what was taken as a "sexist and racist outburst", with Gill opining that, "ideas contrary to fashionable preconceptions are always likely to throw academia into a fit".

According to Inside Higher Ed:

Perhaps almost as notable as the president's direct response was the condemnation issued jointly by the college's economics department and the Adam Smith Society ... "It is important to note that the remark was offensive not just because it was racially insensitive, but because it was erroneous and indicated poor-quality scholarship. There is ample scholarly evidence that, after adjusting for productivity-related characteristics (e.g., years of schooling, work experience, union and industry status, etc.) a considerable wage gap remains."

=== Evictionism (in contrast to abortion) ===
According to Block's moral theory, the act of abortion must be conceptually separated into the acts of the eviction of the fetus from the womb, and the killing of the fetus. Building on the libertarian stand against trespass and murder, Block supports a right to the first act, but, except in certain circumstances, not the second act. Block believes the woman may legally abort if the fetus is not viable outside the womb, or the woman has announced to the world her abandonment of the right to custody of the fetus, and no one else has "homesteaded" that right by offering to care for the fetus.

=== Homesteading ===
==== Blockean Proviso ====
Block argues that if property is "necessary" for others to use, to get to unowned property, they have an easement over it and compared it to a person who murders a child without feeding it. He cites the example of a person with donut shaped land who doesn't allow anyone to get to the middle of his land as incompatible with the logic of homesteading.

Stephan Kinsella, who disagreed with Block, coined the term "The Blockean Proviso" after The Lockean Proviso. It has since been called the Blockean or Blockian proviso.

==== Negative homesteading ====
Block has theorized on whether a person acting in self-defense can harm a human shield or hostage used by an aggressor. Block holds this is legitimate because the human shield is the first victim of the aggressor and, as such, cannot be allowed to pass on their misery to the defending person, the intended second victim of the aggressor. Block calls this "negative homesteading theory".

=== Foreign policy ===
On April 13, 2026, Block gave his support for the U.S. war against Iran in an article co-written with James Delmore.

=== Animal rights ===
Block believes that the libertarian non-aggression principle does not apply to animals and that the right of human owners to kill, torture, or otherwise abuse animals may be an unavoidable corollary of libertarian premises. He articulated this position in a 2017 debate on animal rights, maintaining that groups must be able to petition for rights and respect the rights of others in order to qualify for rights themselves.

== Publications ==
=== As author ===
- Defending the Undefendable (1976; translated into ten foreign languages.) ISBN 0930073053
- A Response to the Framework Document for Amending the Combines Investigation Act (1982)
- Focus on Economics and the Canadian Bishops (1983)
- Focus on Employment Equity: A Critique of the Abella Royal Commission on Equality in Employment (with Michael A. Walker; 1985)
- The U.S. Bishops and Their Critics: An Economic and Ethical Perspective (1986). ISBN 978-0889750852. OCLC 15348791
- Lexicon of Economic Thought (with Michael A. Walker; 1988) ISBN 978-0889750814. OCLC 246846272
- Economic Freedom of the World, 1975–1995 (with James Gwartney, Robert Lawson; 1996)
- Labor Economics from a Free Market Perspective: Employing the Unemployable (2008). ISBN 978-9812705686. OCLC 169873717
- The Privatization of Roads and Highways: Human and Economic Factors (2009). ISBN 978-0773458413. OCLC 64487353
- Differing Worldviews in Higher Education: Two Scholars Argue Cooperatively about Justice Education (2010) ISBN 978-9460913501
- Building Blocks for Liberty (2010). Ludwig von Mises Institute, ISBN 978-1933550916. OCLC 717747069
- The case for discrimination. Auburn, Alabama: Ludwig von Mises Institute. 2010. ISBN 978-1-933550-81-7.
- Yes to Ron Paul and Liberty (2012). ISBN 978-4871873239. OCLC 810904922
- Defending the Undefendable II (2013). ISBN 978-1908089373.
- Water Capitalism: The Case for Privatizing Oceans, Rivers, Lakes, and Aquifers (2016). ISBN 978-1498518826.
- Space Capitalism: How Humans Will Colonize Planets, Moons, and Asteroids (2018). ISBN 978-3319746500.
- The Classical Liberal Case for Israel (2021) (with Alan G. Futerman). ISBN 9789811639531.

=== As editor ===
- Zoning: Its Costs and Relevance for the 1980s (Ed.; 1980)
- Rent Control: Myths & Realities (Ed. with Edgar Olsen; 1981)
- Discrimination, Affirmative Action and Equal Opportunity (Ed. with Michael A. Walker; 1982)
- Taxation: An International Perspective (Ed. with Michael A. Walker; 1984)
- Economics and the Environment: A Reconciliation (Ed.; 1985; translated into Portuguese 1992) ISBN 088975067X
- Morality of the Market: Religious and Economic Perspectives (Ed. with Geoffrey Brennan, Kenneth Elzinga; 1985)
- Theology, Third World Development and Economic Justice (Ed. with Donald Shaw; 1985)
- Reaction: The New Combines Investigation Act (Ed.; 1986)
- Religion, Economics & Social Thought (Ed. with Irving Hexham; 1986)
- Man, Economy and Liberty: Essays in Honor of Murray N. Rothbard (Ed. with Lew Rockwell; 1988)
- Breaking the Shackles; the Economics of Deregulation: A Comparison of U.S. and Canadian Experience (Ed. with George Lermer; 1991)
- Economic Freedom: Toward a Theory of Measurement (Ed.; 1991)
- Libertarian Autobiographies (Ed.; forthcoming)
