= Mises Institute =

Economics think tank

Coordinates: 32.6066°N 85.4913°W

- Founder: Lew Rockwell
- Established: 1982; 44 years ago
- Focus: Economics education, Austrian school of economics, and libertarianism
- Faculty: 350+
- Staff: 21
- Key people: Lew Rockwell (Chairman); Thomas DiLorenzo (President); Joseph Salerno (Editor; Quarterly Journal of Austrian Economics)
- Budget: Revenue: $4,200,056; Expenses: $4,165,289 (FYE 2017)
- Location: Auburn, Alabama, United States
- Website: mises.org

The Ludwig von Mises Institute for Austrian Economics, or simply the Mises Institute, is a nonprofit educational, research, and publishing institution for Austrian economic thought, headquartered in Auburn, Alabama. It is a center for the anarcho-capitalist movements in the United States, particularly for right-wing libertarian thought and the paleolibertarian movement. It is named after the economist Ludwig von Mises (1881–1973) and promotes the Misesian version of heterodox Austrian economics.

The Mises Institute was founded in 1982 by Lew Rockwell, chief of staff to Texas Republican Congressman Ron Paul. Early supporters of the institute included economist Friedrich Hayek, writer Henry Hazlitt, economist Murray Rothbard, Ron Paul, and libertarian coin dealer Burt Blumert.

== History ==
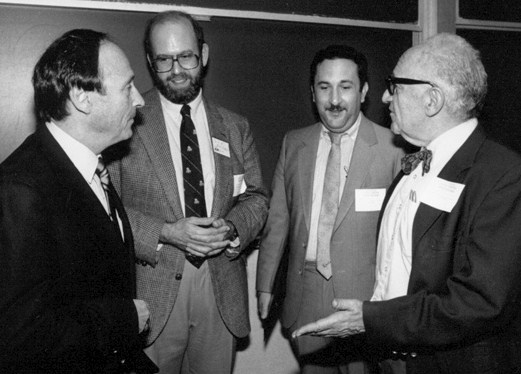
Burton Blumert, Lew Rockwell, David Gordon, and Murray Rothbard

The Mises Institute was founded in 1982 by Lew Rockwell, who was chief of staff to Texas Republican Congressman Ron Paul; previously Rockwell had been editor for the conservative Arlington House Publishers and had worked for the far-right John Birch Society and the traditionalist Hillsdale College. Rockwell received the blessing of Margit von Mises (Ludwig's widow) during a meeting at the Russian Tea Room in New York City, and she was named the first chairman of the board. According to Rockwell, the institute was meant to promote the contributions of Ludwig von Mises, who he feared was being ignored by libertarian institutions financed by Charles Koch and David Koch. As recounted by Justin Raimondo, Rockwell said he received a phone call from George Pearson, of the Koch Foundation, who had said that Mises was too radical to name an organization after or promote.

The original academic vice president of the Mises Institute was Murray Rothbard, an influential right-wing libertarian activist and writer who had studied under Ludwig von Mises; Rothbard was a leading figure in the development of anarcho-capitalism and had also been a Cato Institute co-founder. Ron Paul, the Texas Republican congressman who would later run for president of the United States, was named a distinguished counselor and assisted with early fundraising. A timber company owner also contributed funds.

Judge John V. Denson assisted in the Mises Institute becoming established at the campus of Auburn University. Auburn was already home to some Austrian economists, including Roger Garrison. The Mises Institute was affiliated with the Auburn University Business School until 1998 when the institute established its own building across the street from campus.

The Mises Institute established the Review of Austrian Economics peer-reviewed academic journal in 1986. In 1998, the Mises Institute replaced the journal with the Quarterly Journal of Austrian Economics, while the Review of Austrian Economics was transferred to George Mason University.

The Mises Institute aligned itself with what Rothbard called the Old Right, with "a defense of the gold standard, military isolationism, and 'traditional morality' and opposition to fiat money, supranational institutions, and 'forced integration'", according to academics Niklas Olsen and Quinn Slobodian. Rothbard and Rockwell coined the name "paleolibertarians" for socially right-wing libertarians like themselves. They forged a "paleo alliance" between paleolibertarians and paleoconservatives in the form of the John Randolph Club in 1989, which allied the Mises Institute and the paleoconservative Rockford Institute. Figures at the Mises Institute were associated with neo-Confederate positions, and the institute held conferences about secession, including one in 1995 in Charleston, South Carolina, where the American Civil War had begun. After Rothbard's death in 1996, his protege Hans-Hermann Hoppe became a leading anarcho-capitalist figure of the institute and is known for his anti-democratic writing. In a 2000 report, the Southern Poverty Law Center (SPLC) said that the Mises Institute had shown "recent interest in neo-Confederate themes" and that Rockwell, the institute's founder, had "argued that the Civil War 'transformed the American regime from a federalist system based on freedom to a centralized state that circumscribed liberty in the name of public order.'" Kyle Wingfield wrote a 2006 commentary in The Wall Street Journal that the Southern United States was a "natural home" for the institute, as "Southerners have always been distrustful of government," with the institute making the "Heart of Dixie a wellspring of sensible economic thinking."

By 2011, The Economist said, the Austrian School economics championed by the Mises Institute had "won few mainstream converts". But it noted the Mises Institute's growing presence on the internet as well as its facilities in Auburn including an amphitheater, conservatory, recording studio and library. The political scientist George Hawley described the Mises Institute in 2016 as "the intellectual epicenter of the radical libertarian movement in the United States". As of 2022, about 30 Mises Institutes had been created worldwide. While some are no longer operational, some such as the Instituto Rothbard in Brazil have gained political influence.

== Current activities ==
The institute describes its mission as to "promote teaching and research in the Austrian school of economics, and individual freedom, honest history, and international peace, in the tradition of Ludwig von Mises and Murray N. Rothbard."

Its academic programs include Mises University (non-accredited), Rothbard Graduate Seminar, the Austrian Economics Research Conference, and a summer research fellowship program. In 2020, the Mises Institute began offering a graduate program. It publishes the Journal of Libertarian Studies, which it took over in 2000 from the Center for Libertarian Studies.

The German Mises Institute (Ludwig von Mises Institut Deutschland e.V.) is a 2012 founded interest group and think tank of libertarian gold traders and investment advisors, which were associated with Swiss-based German billionaire August von Finck (1930–2021). Many gold dealers from the von Finck company Degussa Goldhandel are active on the board of the institute; they reject intergovernmental fiscal policy and promote gold as a "safe currency". Von Finck was active in economic policy and criticized the EU.

== Political and economic views ==
The Mises Institute describes itself as libertarian, and as promoting the Austrian School of economics. In 2003, Chip Berlet of the SPLC described it as "a major center promoting libertarian political theory and the Austrian School of free market economics", while also assessing that it favors a "Darwinian view of society in which elites are seen as natural and any intervention by the government on behalf of social justice is destructive".

The Mises Institute favors the methodology of Misesian praxeology ("the logic of human action"), which holds that economic science is deductive rather than empirical. Developed by Ludwig von Mises, following the Methodenstreit opined by Carl Menger, it opposes the mathematical modeling and hypothesis-testing used to justify knowledge in neoclassical economics. Misesian economics is a form of heterodox economics. It is distinct from that of other Austrian economists, including Hayek and those associated with George Mason University.

Although the Mises Institute is sometimes described as a think tank, it does not use that term to describe itself, as its stated goals do not include political advocacy or public policy analysis.

== Influence on campaigns and government ==
The paleolibertarian economic and cultural views of some of the Mises Institute's leading figures have been influential in the presidential campaigns of Ron Paul, the presidential campaign of Rand Paul, the presidential campaigns of Donald Trump, and the candidacy of Joshua Smith for chair of the Libertarian Party.

A 2014 New York Times piece described the Mises Institute as part of Rand Paul's intellectual inheritance.

Candice Jackson, who served as acting head of the U.S. Department of Education Office for Civil Rights during the Trump Administration, was previously a summer fellow at the Mises Institute and had collaborated on articles for Rockwell's website.

The Mises Caucus of the Libertarian Party of the United States was established to realign the party closer to the Mises Institute and Ron Paul.

== Notable faculty ==
Notable figures affiliated with the Mises Institute include:

- Walter Block – Austrian School economist and anarcho-capitalist; economics professor at Loyola University New Orleans
- Godfrey Bloom – British politician, former Member of the European Parliament
- Thomas DiLorenzo – economics professor at Loyola University Maryland
- Paul Gottfried – paleoconservative author, former Professor of Humanities at Elizabethtown College
- Hans-Hermann Hoppe – paleolibertarian and anarcho-capitalist business professor at University of Nevada, Las Vegas and founder of Property and Freedom Society
- Jesús Huerta de Soto – Professor of Applied Economics at King Juan Carlos University
- Jörg Guido Hülsmann – Professor of Economics at The University of Angers
- Peter Klein – Professor of Entrepreneurship and Senior Research Fellow with the Center for Entrepreneurship & Free Enterprise at Baylor University
- Robert P. Murphy – economist, Institute for Energy Research
- Andrew Napolitano – Fox News pundit and former judge
- Gary North (1942–2022) – co-founder of Christian reconstructionism and founder of Institute for Christian Economics
- Ron Paul – physician, author, and former congressman
- Ralph Raico (1936–2016) – historian and libertarian specializing in European classical liberalism and Austrian economics
- Murray Rothbard (1926–1995) – heterodox economist, libertarian theorist, polemicist, revisionist historian, and founder of anarcho-capitalism
- Joseph Sobran (1946–2010) – journalist, contributor to American Renaissance and lecturer at the Institute for Historical Review
- Mark Thornton – Austrian School economist
- Jeffrey A. Tucker – economics writer
- Joseph T. Salerno – academic vice president of the Mises Institute, Professor of Economics at Pace University, and editor of the Quarterly Journal of Austrian Economics
- Thomas Woods – historian, political commentator, and author

== See also ==
- Libertarian Party Mises Caucus
- Old Right (United States)
