= Center for Libertarian Studies =

Educational organization

The Center for Libertarian Studies (CLS) was a libertarian and anarcho-capitalist oriented educational organization founded in 1976 by Murray Rothbard and Burton Blumert, which grew out of the Libertarian Scholars Conferences. That year, the conference was sponsored by industrialist and libertarian Charles Koch. It published the Journal of Libertarian Studies from 1977 to 2000 (now published by the Ludwig von Mises Institute), a newsletter (In Pursuit of Liberty), several monographs, and sponsors conferences, seminars, and symposia.

== Publications ==
- Justin Raimondo, Reclaiming the American Right (1993).
- Joseph Sobran, How I Got Fired by Bill Buckley (1994).
- Justin Raimondo, Clinton's Hate Campaign Against the Right: the Oklahoma City Bombing and the Campaign to Crush Dissent (1995)
- Murray Rothbard, Wall Street, Banks, and American Foreign Policy (1995).
- The Rothbard-Rockwell Report (1990–1999)
- Rockwell, Jr, Llewellyn H., editor, The Irrepressible Rothbard: The Rothbard-Rockwell Report, Essays of Murray N. Rothbard (2000)

=== Occasional Papers Series ===
1. Methodology of the Austrian School, Lawrence White
2. The Production of Security, Gustave de Molinari
3. Toward a Reconstruction of Utility and Welfare Economics, Murray Rothbard (1977)
4. The Political Economy of Liberal Corporativism, essays by Joseph Stromberg, Roy A. Childs, and Roger Alexander
5. Theory of Classical Liberal "Industrielisme", Augustin Thierry
6. Why the Futile Crusade?, Leonard Liggio
7. The Clash of Group Interests and Other Essays, Ludwig von Mises (1978)
8. The Austrian Theory of the Trade Cycle and other essays by Ludwig von Mises, Gottfried Haberler, Murray Rothbard, and Friedrich A. Hayek, Richard Ebeling, ed. (1978)
9. Austrian Economics: an Annotated Bibliography, Richard Ebeling
10. Frank S. Meyer: The Fusionist as Libertarian Manqué, Murray Rothbard (1984)
