= Quarterly Journal of Austrian Economics =

The Quarterly Journal of Austrian Economics
- Discipline: Economics
- Language: English
- Edited by: Joseph Salerno

Publication details
- Former name: Review of Austrian Economics
- History: 1987–present
- Publisher: Ludwig von Mises Institute (United States)
- Frequency: quarterly

Standard abbreviations
- ISO 4: Q. J. Austrian Econ.

Indexing
- ISSN: 1936-4806 (print); 1098-3708 (web)
- LCCN: 99100420
- OCLC no.: 53929018

Links
- Journal homepage; Online archive

The Quarterly Journal of Austrian Economics is a quarterly peer-reviewed academic journal covering heterodox economics published by the Ludwig von Mises Institute. It was established in 1998 after the Murray Rothbard-created publication, The Review of Austrian Economics, was transferred to other editors and then to George Mason University. The journal covers economics from an Austrian School perspective. The current editor-in-chief is Joseph Salerno.

A 2010 study identified 62 regularly published heterodox journals and used various empirical criteria to compare several aspects of their research quality. The Quarterly Journal's Bibliographic Ranking was ranked 33rd out of the 62 heterodox economics journals surveyed; its reputation among peers (both mainstream and heterodox) was ranked 57th.
