= Joseph T. Salerno =

American Austrian School economist (born 1950)

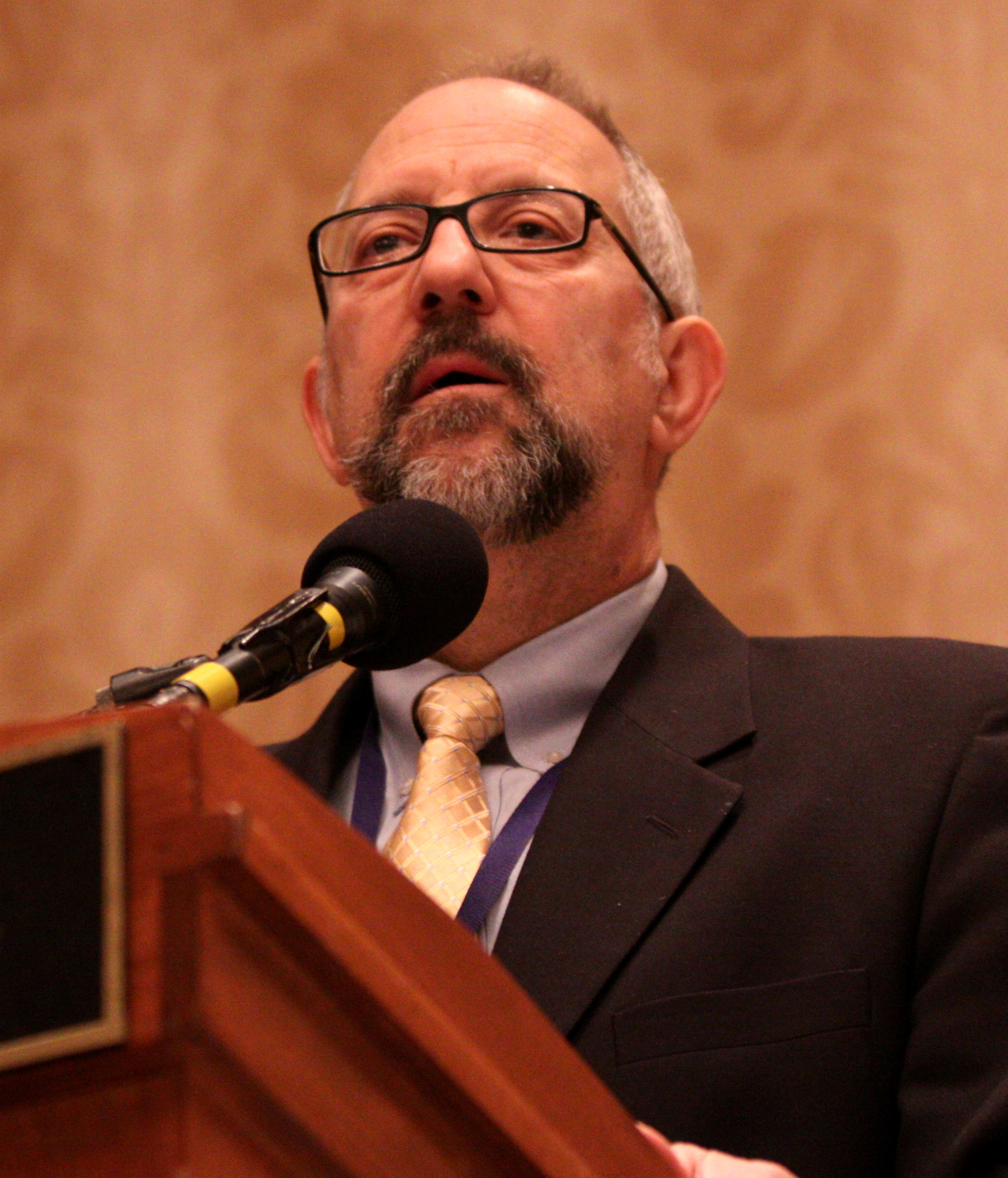
- Salerno in 2011
- Born: May 15, 1950 (age 76)

Academic background
- Education: Rutgers University
- Influences: Murray Rothbard

Academic work
- School or tradition: Austrian School
- Institutions: Lubin Business School of Pace University

Joseph T. Salerno (born 1950) is an American Austrian School economist who is Professor Emeritus of Economics in the Finance and Graduate Economics departments at the Lubin School of Business at Pace University, Academic Vice President of the Ludwig von Mises Institute, and holds the John V. Denson II Endowed Professorship in the economics department at Auburn University. He earned his B.A. at Boston College and his M.A. and Ph.D. at Rutgers University.

== Early life ==
Salerno's parents immigrated to the United States from Italy. As a child, he observed his "New Deal Democrat" father's disdain for a visiting relative from Italy who had declared himself a member of the Italian Communist Party. Salerno said that following the incident, he became a supporter of Barry Goldwater's 1964 presidential candidacy and a "full-fledged Goldwaterite." Thereafter, Salerno decided that he wanted to study economics. As an undergraduate at Boston College, he read an article written by Murray Rothbard and adopted what he describes as "the pure libertarian position... anarcho-capitalism." This, he stated, led to his interest in the Austrian School.

== Career in economics ==
Salerno has published op-eds online at mises.org, forbes.com, Christian Science Monitor, Wall Street Oasis, and Economic Policy Journal. He has appeared on Bloomberg Radio, C-SPAN, Fox News, and the Fox Business Networks. Salerno's theories have been explicated by Israel Kirzner in a survey of Austrian thought on entrepreneurship.

== Bibliography ==
- Money, Sound and Unsound (Full Text; ISBN 978-1-933550-93-0) (2010)
