= Loren Miller (libertarian activist) =

American libertarian

Loren Miller was an American civic reformer and libertarian activist in the first half of the 20th century. Perhaps Miller's most lasting contribution was his success in convincing business magnates to support libertarian causes and organizations. The most notable case was William Volker who, at Miller's suggestion, founded the William Volker Fund in 1932. Other examples included Jasper Crane of DuPont; B. E. Hutchinson of Chrysler; Henry Weaver of General Electric; Pierre Goodrich, the Indianapolis businessman and creator in 1960 of Liberty Fund; Richard Earhart, founder of the Earhart Foundation; and Harold Luhnow of the Volker Fund.

Miller's political career started as a municipal reformer in Kansas City, Missouri, opposing the entrenched Pendergast political machine. For a time, Miller worked with the Detroit Bureau of Governmental Research (now the Citizens Research Council of Michigan). Later, he worked in New York City with Dun & Bradstreet on their municipal work, and also worked as associate director of the Bureau of Governmental Research of Newark, New Jersey.

After the establishment of the Volker Fund, Miller went on to become director of the Volker-funded Kansas City Civic Research Institute from 1942 to 1944. He stayed in Kansas City until 1944, and then he left to go back to the Detroit Bureau of Governmental Research as its director.

In 1947, he attended the first meeting of the Mont Pelerin Society.

Subsequently, Miller returned to the Volker Fund, where he worked with Luhnow and Herb Cornuelle, who later became vice president of Dole Corporation and president of United Brands.
