= Herb Cornuelle =

Herb Cornuelle (died 1996) was a businessman and activist in Hawaii, who was involved in the development of free market think tanks during the mid-twentieth century. With F. A. "Baldy" Harper, Cornuelle helped found the Foundation for Economic Education in New York in 1946, and later became head of the William Volker Fund (where he hired Murray Rothbard as an academic consultant). His siblings include libertarian author Richard Cornuelle.

Cornuelle came to Hawaii in 1942 as a Navy ensign and returned to Hawaii in 1953 as vice president of Hawaiian Pine, later the Dole Pineapple Company. Five years later, at age 38, he was elevated to president of the company. Cornuelle moved to Boston and led the United Fruit Company from 1963 until 1969, when he returned to Honolulu to head Dillingham Corp. He joined the Campbell Estate in 1982 as a trustee, retiring as board chairman in 1990. He also served as chairman of the Board of Regents at the University of Hawaii from March 1961 to June 1963, chairman of the East-West Center Board of Governors, and on the Cono Sur Board of Directors.

According to a popular story, Cornuelle helped set the tone of his leadership at Dillingham during a business flight to the Mainland. With other executives seated in first class, the 6-foot-4 Cornuelle made his way to the coach section to find a seat.

== Bibliography ==
- A study of the Kansas City police department, James Montrose Leonard, Herbert C. Cornuelle, Kansas City (Mo.). Civic Research Institute, 1943
- Mr. Anonymous, the story of William Volker. Herbert C. Cornuelle, Caldwell, Idaho, Caxton Printers, 1951.
