= Jongny =

- Municipality
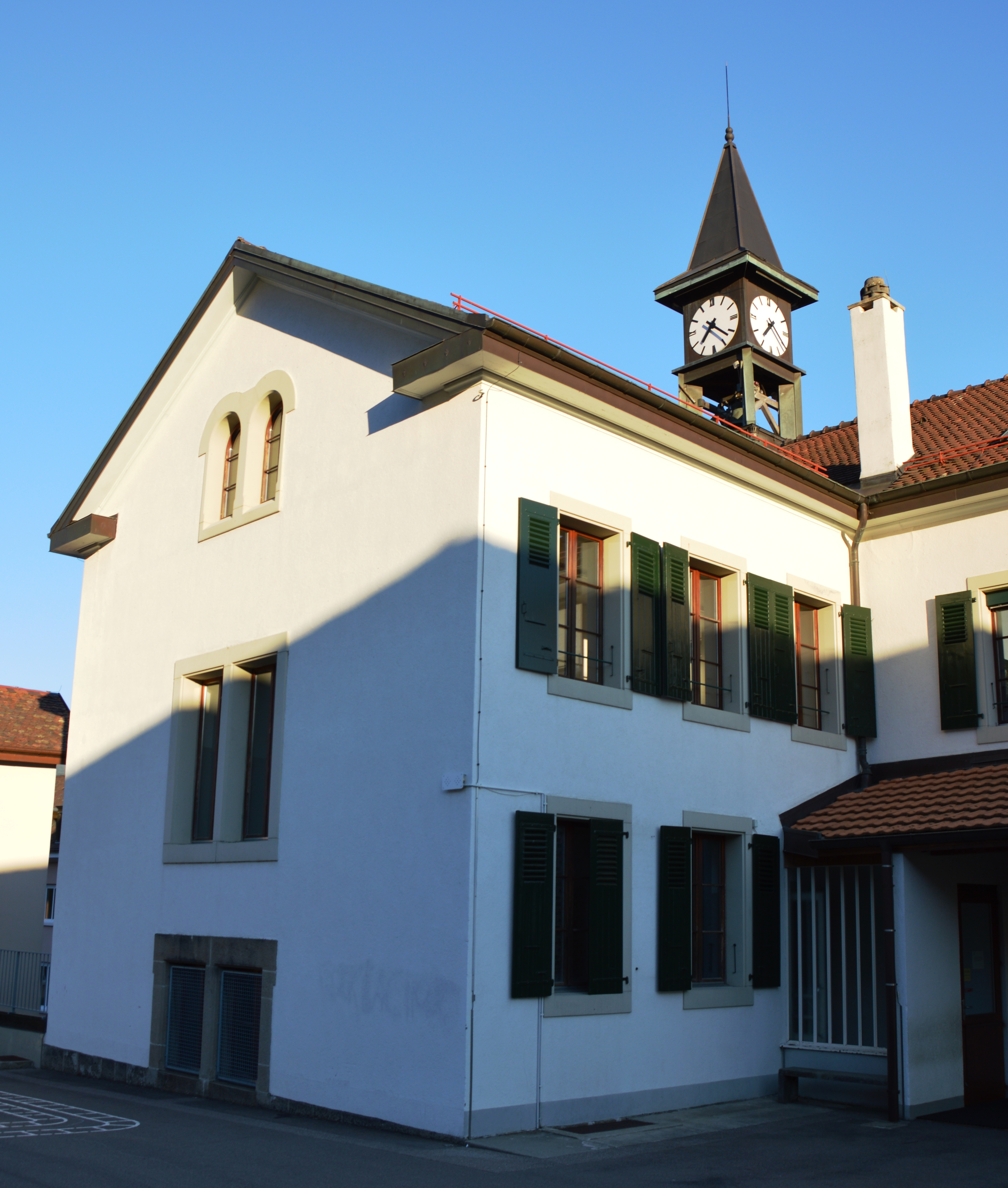

- Flag Coat of arms
- Location of Jongny
- Location within Switzerland Location within Canton of Vaud
- Coordinates: 46°29′N 6°51′E
- Country: Switzerland
- Canton: Vaud
- District: Riviera-Pays-d'Enhaut

Government
  - Mayor: Syndique; Nicole Pointet

Area
  - Total: 2.2 km^{2} (0.85 sq mi)
- Elevation: 639 m (2,096 ft)

Population (2003)
  - Total: 1,329
  - Density: 600/km^{2} (1,600/sq mi)
- Time zone: UTC+01:00 (CET)
  - Summer (DST): UTC+02:00 (CEST)
- Postal code: 1805
- SFOS number: 5885
- ISO 3166 code: CH-VD
- Surrounded by: Chardonne, Corsier-sur-Vevey, Attalens (FR), Granges-Veveyse
- Website: www.jongny.ch

Jongny (French pronunciation: [ʒɔ̃ɲi]) is a municipality in the district of Riviera-Pays-d'Enhaut in the canton of Vaud in Switzerland.

== History ==
Jongny is first mentioned around 1168-80 as Iaunie.

== Geography ==
Jongny has an area, as of 2009, of 2.2 square kilometers (0.85 mi^{2}). Of this area, 1.06 km^{2} (0.41 mi^{2}) or 49.1% is used for agricultural purposes, while 0.47 km^{2} (0.18 mi^{2}) or 21.8% is forested. Of the rest of the land, 0.62 km^{2} (0.24 mi^{2}) or 28.7% is settled (buildings or roads) and 0.01 km^{2} (2.5 acres) or 0.5% is unproductive land.

Of the built up area, housing and buildings made up 17.6% and transportation infrastructure made up 9.3%. Power and water infrastructure as well as other special developed areas made up 1.9% of the area Out of the forested land, 18.1% of the total land area is heavily forested and 3.7% is covered with orchards or small clusters of trees. Of the agricultural land, 7.9% is used for growing crops and 38.0% is pastures, while 3.2% is used for orchards or vine crops.

The municipality was part of the Vevey until it was dissolved on 31 August 2006, and Jongny became part of the new district of Riviera-Pays-d'Enhaut.

The municipality is located in the south-east foothills of Mont Pèlerin.

== Coat of arms ==
The blazon of the municipal coat of arms is Azure, a Bell between two Mullets of Five in chief and a Heart in base all Argent.

== Demographics ==
Jongny has a population (as of December 2020) of 1,671. As of 2008, 22.9% of the population are resident foreign nationals. Over the last 10 years (1999–2009 ) the population has changed at a rate of 11.4%. It has changed at a rate of 10.7% due to migration and at a rate of 0.5% due to births and deaths.

Most of the population (as of 2000) speaks French (1,078 or 83.8%) as their first language, with German being second most common (117 or 9.1%) and English being third (29 or 2.3%). There are 21 people who speak Italian and 2 people who speak Romansh.

The age distribution, as of 2009, in Jongny is; 144 children or 10.2% of the population are between 0 and 9 years old and 162 teenagers or 11.4% are between 10 and 19. Of the adult population, 136 people or 9.6% of the population are between 20 and 29 years old. 182 people or 12.8% are between 30 and 39, 232 people or 16.4% are between 40 and 49, and 190 people or 13.4% are between 50 and 59. The senior population distribution is 212 people or 15.0% of the population are between 60 and 69 years old, 102 people or 7.2% are between 70 and 79, there are 47 people or 3.3% who are between 80 and 89, and there are 11 people or 0.8% who are 90 and older.

As of 2000, there were 488 people who were single and never married in the municipality. There were 687 married individuals, 51 widows or widowers and 60 individuals who are divorced.

As of 2000, there were 503 private households in the municipality, and an average of 2.5 persons per household. There were 111 households that consist of only one person and 33 households with five or more people. Out of a total of 514 households that answered this question, 21.6% were households made up of just one person and there were 2 adults who lived with their parents. Of the rest of the households, there are 183 married couples without children, 182 married couples with children There were 19 single parents with a child or children. There were 6 households that were made up of unrelated people and 11 households that were made up of some sort of institution or another collective housing.

In 2000 there were 289 single family homes (or 75.3% of the total) out of a total of 384 inhabited buildings. There were 57 multi-family buildings (14.8%), along with 28 multi-purpose buildings that were mostly used for housing (7.3%) and 10 other use buildings (commercial or industrial) that also had some housing (2.6%).

In 2000, a total of 488 apartments (85.8% of the total) were permanently occupied, while 61 apartments (10.7%) were seasonally occupied and 20 apartments (3.5%) were empty. As of 2009, the construction rate of new housing units was 2.1 new units per 1000 residents. The vacancy rate for the municipality, in 2010, was 1.82%.

The historical population is given in the following chart:

== Heritage sites of national significance ==
Jongny is part of the UNESCO World Heritage Site: Lavaux, Vineyard Terraces, which is also listed as a Swiss heritage site of national significance.

== Politics ==
In the 2007 federal election the most popular party was the SVP which received 20.45% of the vote. The next three most popular parties were the SP (20.15%), the Green Party (18.52%) and the FDP (15.75%). In the federal election, a total of 471 votes were cast, and the voter turnout was 51.1%.

== Economy ==
As of 2010, Jongny had an unemployment rate of 2.6%. As of 2008, there were 12 people employed in the primary economic sector and about 6 businesses involved in this sector. 14 people were employed in the secondary sector and there were 5 businesses in this sector. 142 people were employed in the tertiary sector, with 35 businesses in this sector. There were 657 residents of the municipality who were employed in some capacity, of which females made up 44.3% of the workforce.

In 2008 the total number of full-time equivalent jobs was 137. The number of jobs in the primary sector was 8, all of which were in agriculture. The number of jobs in the secondary sector was 13 of which 4 or (30.8%) were in manufacturing and 7 (53.8%) were in construction. The number of jobs in the tertiary sector was 116. In the tertiary sector; 7 or 6.0% were in wholesale or retail sales or the repair of motor vehicles, 11 or 9.5% were in the movement and storage of goods, 7 or 6.0% were in a hotel or restaurant, 1 was in the information industry, 2 or 1.7% were the insurance or financial industry, 15 or 12.9% were technical professionals or scientists, 35 or 30.2% were in education and 24 or 20.7% were in health care.

In 2000, there were 81 workers who commuted into the municipality and 565 workers who commuted away. The municipality is a net exporter of workers, with about 7.0 workers leaving the municipality for every one entering. Of the working population, 13.9% used public transportation to get to work, and 73.5% used a private car.

== Religion ==
From the 2000 census, 430 or 33.4% were Roman Catholic, while 596 or 46.3% belonged to the Swiss Reformed Church. Of the rest of the population, there were 5 members of an Orthodox church (or about 0.39% of the population), there were 5 individuals (or about 0.39% of the population) who belonged to the Christian Catholic Church, and there were 78 individuals (or about 6.07% of the population) who belonged to another Christian church. There were 10 (or about 0.78% of the population) who were Islamic. There were 2 individuals who were Hindu and 1 individual who belonged to another church. 158 (or about 12.29% of the population) belonged to no church, are agnostic or atheist, and 37 individuals (or about 2.88% of the population) did not answer the question.

== Education ==
In Jongny about 498 or (38.7%) of the population have completed non-mandatory upper secondary education, and 282 or (21.9%) have completed additional higher education (either university or a Fachhochschule). Of the 282 who completed tertiary schooling, 54.3% were Swiss men, 28.4% were Swiss women, 11.0% were non-Swiss men and 6.4% were non-Swiss women.

In the 2009/2010 school year there were a total of 134 students in the Jongny school district. In the Vaud cantonal school system, two years of non-obligatory pre-school are provided by the political districts. During the school year, the political district provided pre-school care for a total of 817 children of which 456 children (55.8%) received subsidized pre-school care. The canton's primary school program requires students to attend for four years. There were 76 students in the municipal primary school program. The obligatory lower secondary school program lasts for six years and there were 58 students in those schools.

As of 2000, there were 32 students in Jongny who came from another municipality, while 149 residents attended schools outside the municipality.
