= Luhnow =

Luhnow is a surname. Notable people with the surname include:

- Harold Luhnow (1895–1978), American businessman
- Jeff Luhnow (born 1966), Mexican-American baseball executive and club owner
