= Pelerin Palace =

Notable hotel in Switzerland

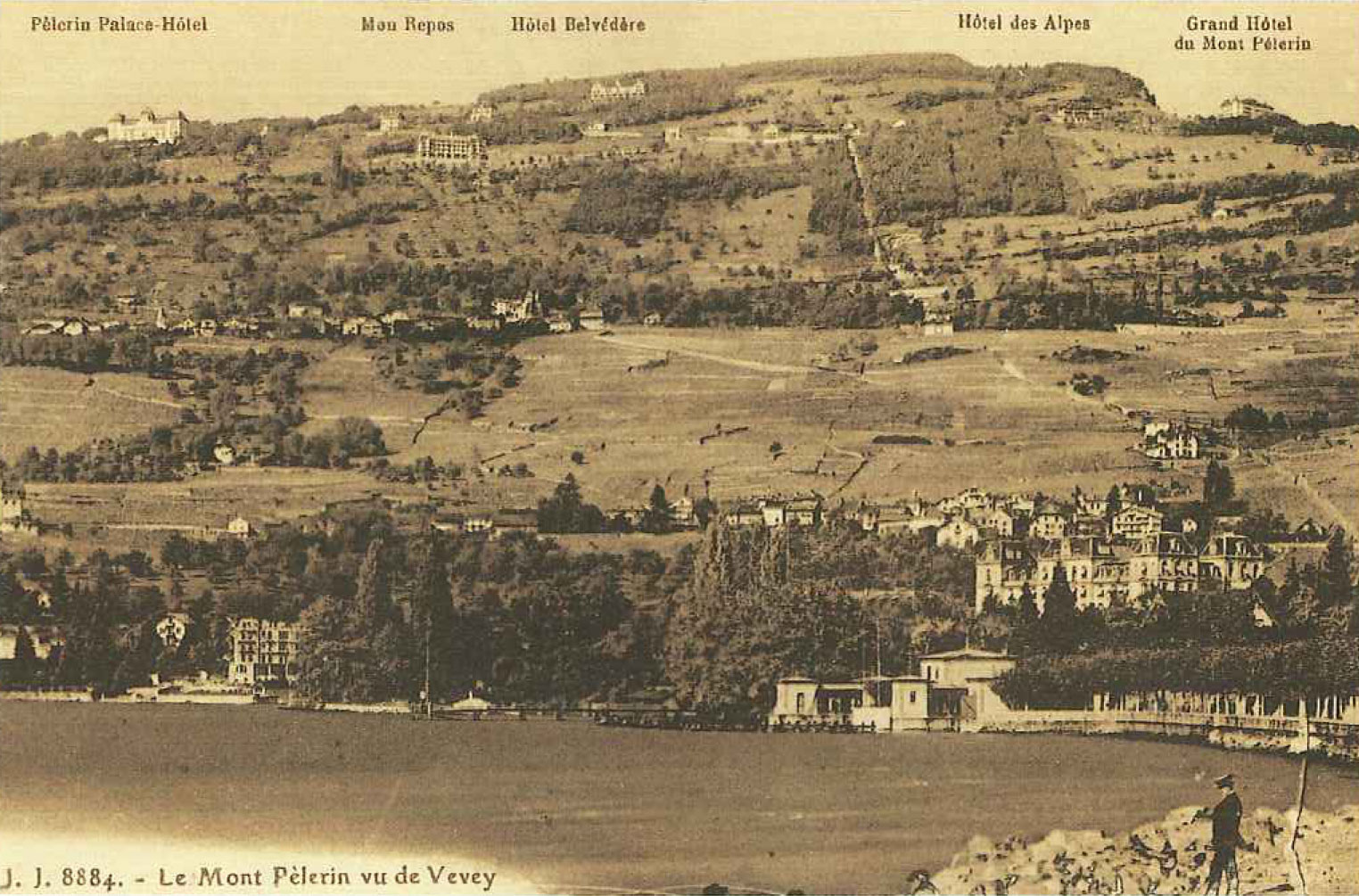
View of Le Mont-Pèlerin showing various hotels including Pelerin Palace in the top left hand corner

Pelerin Palace (also known as Hotel du Parc) is a Belle Époque style hotel built in 1906 in Le Mont-Pèlerin, Vaud, Switzerland overlooking Lake Geneva. The opening of the Vevey–Chardonne–Mont Pèlerin funicular railway in 1900 facilitated the development of the location as a resort. Pelerin Palace was the third major hotel built in the locality following Hotel Belvedere (1902) and the Grand Hotel (1904). It was built on the initiative of Henri Fatio, a Geneva-based financier who attracted investors based in Vevey.

The original hotel suffered serious damage in a fire in 1917 which destroyed the roof.

Hotel du Parc was the venue of the founding conference of the Mont Pelerin Society in 1947. Due to the hotel's poor condition, the fiftieth reunion of the Mont Pelerin Society was held in the neighbouring Hotel Le Mirador (formerly the Mon Repos medical establishment) on 9–12 April 1997 and attracted around 100 people.

== Redevelopment ==
In 2008 the Geneva company, the Swiss Development Group (SDG), acquired the building for 18m CHF and stated they intended to convert the hotel into luxury apartments with a price range from 4m-22.6m CHF (US$3.94m - US$22.6m). The building was renamed "Du Parc Kempinsky Private Residences" in light of an agreement for Kempinski Hotels S.A to manage the property. The renovations were scheduled to be finished by 2012. However, by January 2016, despite having high-profile celebrities like Tony Parker sign up to move in, the building was unfinished and the company in financial difficulties. However, SDG was able to avoid bankruptcy and claimed that the project would be completed.
