= Leonard Read =

American academic (1898–1983)

- Lawrence Fertig, Ludwig von Mises, Leonard Read and Henry Hazlitt (left to right)
- Born: September 26, 1898; Hubbardston, Michigan, U.S.
- Died: May 14, 1983 (aged 84)

Academic background
- Influences: Frédéric Bastiat; Murray Rothbard; Milton Friedman; F. A. Hayek; Henry Hazlitt; Ludwig von Mises; Albert Jay Nock; Ayn Rand

Academic work
- School or tradition: Austrian School
- Institutions: Foundation for Economic Education (founder)

Leonard Edward Read (September 26, 1898 – May 14, 1983) was the founder of the Foundation for Economic Education (FEE), one of the first free market think tanks in the United States. He wrote 29 books and numerous essays, including "I, Pencil" (1958).

== Business career ==
After a stint in the United States Army Air Service during World War I, Read started a grocery wholesale business in Ann Arbor, Michigan, which was initially successful but eventually went out of business. He moved to California where he started a new career in the tiny Burlingame Chamber of Commerce near San Francisco. Read gradually moved up the hierarchy of the United States Chamber of Commerce, finally becoming general manager of the Los Angeles branch, the U.S.'s largest, in 1939.

== Libertarian activism ==
During this period his views became progressively more libertarian. Apparently, it was in 1933, during a meeting with William C. Mullendore, the executive vice president of Southern California Edison, that Read was finally convinced that the New Deal was completely inefficient and morally bankrupt. Read was also profoundly influenced by his religious beliefs. His pastor, Reverend James W. Fifield Jr., was minister of the 4,000-member First Congregational Church of Los Angeles, of which Read was also a board member. Fifield ran a "resistance movement" against the "social gospel" of the New Deal, trying to convince ministers across the country to adopt libertarian "spiritual ideals". During the period when he worked for the Chamber of Commerce, Read was also deeply influenced by more secular figures, such as Albert Jay Nock, and later by Ayn Rand and the economists Ludwig von Mises and Henry Hazlitt.

In 1945, Virgil Jordan, the President of the National Industrial Conference Board (NICB) in New York, invited Read to become its executive vice president. Read realized he would have to leave the NICB to pursue full-time the promotion of free market, limited government principles. He resigned as a result.

One donor from his short time at NICB, David M. Goodrich, encouraged Read to start his own organization. With Goodrich's aid, as well as financial aid from the William Volker Fund and from Harold Luhnow, Read and Hazlitt founded the Foundation for Economic Education in 1946, which, in turn, helped to inspire Friedrich Hayek to form the Mont Pelerin Society the following year. For a period in the 1940s, Rand was an important adviser, or "ghost", as they called it, to Read.

In 1950, Read joined the board of directors for the newly founded periodical The Freeman, a free market magazine that was a forerunner of the conservative National Review, to which Read was also a contributor. In 1954, Read arranged for the struggling magazine to be transferred to a for-profit company owned by FEE. In 1956, FEE assumed direct control of the magazine, turning it into a non-profit outreach tool for the foundation.

Read received an Honorary Doctoral Degree at Universidad Francisco Marroquín in 1976. He continued to work with FEE until his death in 1983.

== Works ==
Read authored 29 books, some of which are still in print and sold by FEE.

- Romance of Reality (New York: Dodd, Mead & Co., Inc., 1937)
- I'd Push the Button (New York: Joseph D. McGuire, 1946)
- Pattern for Revolt (1948)
- Students of Liberty (FEE, 1950)
- Outlook for Freedom (1951)
- Government – an Ideal Concept (FEE, 1954; 2nd edition 1997) ISBN 1-57246-061-X
- "I, Pencil" (FEE, 1958 & 2008)
- Why Not Try Freedom? (FEE, 1958)
- Elements of Libertarian Leadership (FEE, 1962)
- Anything That's Peaceful: The Case for the Free Market (FEE, 1964; revised edition 1992; 2nd edition 1998) ISBN 1-57246-079-2
- The Free Market and Its Enemy (FEE, 1965)
- Deeper Than You Think (FEE, 1967)
- Where Lies This Fault? (FEE, 1967)
- Accent on the Right (FEE, 1968)
- The Coming Aristocracy (FEE, 1969)
- Let Freedom Reign (FEE, 1969)
- Talking To Myself (FEE, 1970)
- Then Truth Will Out (FEE, 1971)
- To Free or Freeze, That is the Question (FEE, 1972)
- Instead of Violence (FEE, 1973)
- Who's Listening (FEE, 1973)
- Free Man's Almanac (FEE, 1974)
- Having My Way (FEE, 1974)
- Castles in the Air (FEE, 1975) ISBN 0-910614-52-0
- The Love of Liberty (FEE, 1975)
- Comes the Dawn (FEE, 1976)
- Awake for Freedom's Sake (FEE, 1977)
- Vision (FEE, 1978)
- Liberty: Legacy of Truth (FEE, 1978)
- The Freedom Freeway (FEE, 1979)
- Seeds of Progress (FEE, 1980)
- Thoughts Rule the World (FEE, 1981)
- How Do We Know (FEE, 1981)
- The Path of Duty (FEE, 1982)
- Clichés of Socialism (FEE, various)

In 2025, the Mises Institute published an anthology of Read's writings edited by Gary Galles.

== Unpublished Work ==
Read kept private journals from 1949 to 1978, all of which are available in archive form from FEE.

- Leonard E. Read Journal (FEE, various)

== See also ==
- Classical liberalism
- Laissez-faire
- List of American libertarians
