= Attalens =

- Municipality
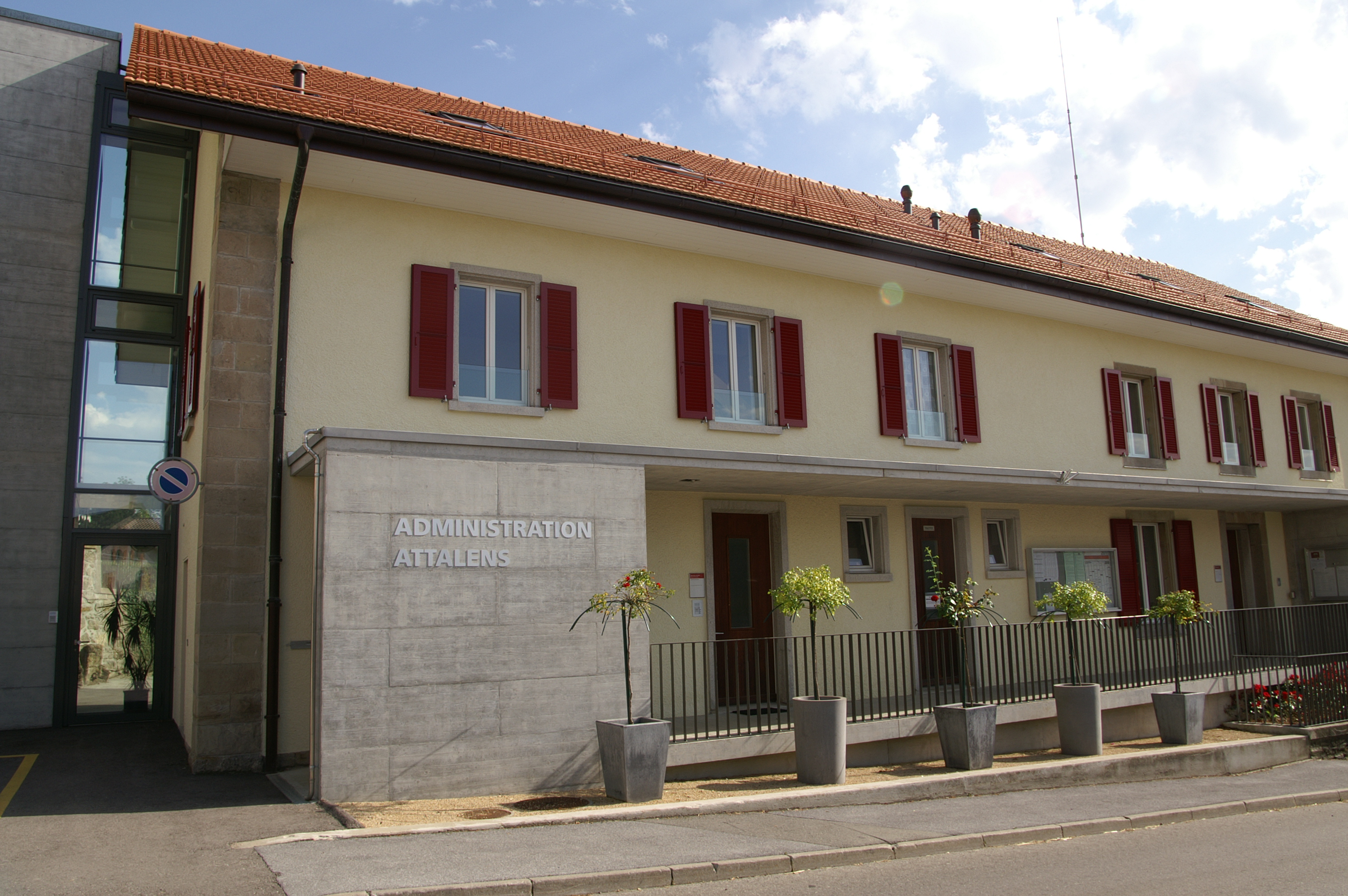
- Attalens Town Hall

- Flag Coat of arms
- Location of Attalens
- Location within Switzerland Location within Canton of Fribourg
- Coordinates: 46°31′N 6°51′E
- Country: Switzerland
- Canton: Fribourg
- District: Veveyse

Government
  - Mayor: Syndic

Area
  - Total: 9.82 km^{2} (3.79 sq mi)
- Elevation: 777 m (2,549 ft)

Population (December 2020)
  - Total: 3,580
  - Density: 365/km^{2} (944/sq mi)
- Time zone: UTC+01:00 (CET)
  - Summer (DST): UTC+02:00 (CEST)
- Postal code: 1616
- SFOS number: 2321
- ISO 3166 code: CH-FR
- Surrounded by: Bossonnens, Chardonne (VD), Corsier-sur-Vevey (VD), Ecoteaux (VD), Granges (Veveyse), Jongny (VD), Remaufens
- Website: www.attalens.ch

Attalens (French: [atalɑ̃s]; Arpitan: Atalens, locally Atalin [ataˈlɛ̃] or Talin) is a municipality in the district of Veveyse in the canton of Fribourg in Switzerland.

== History ==
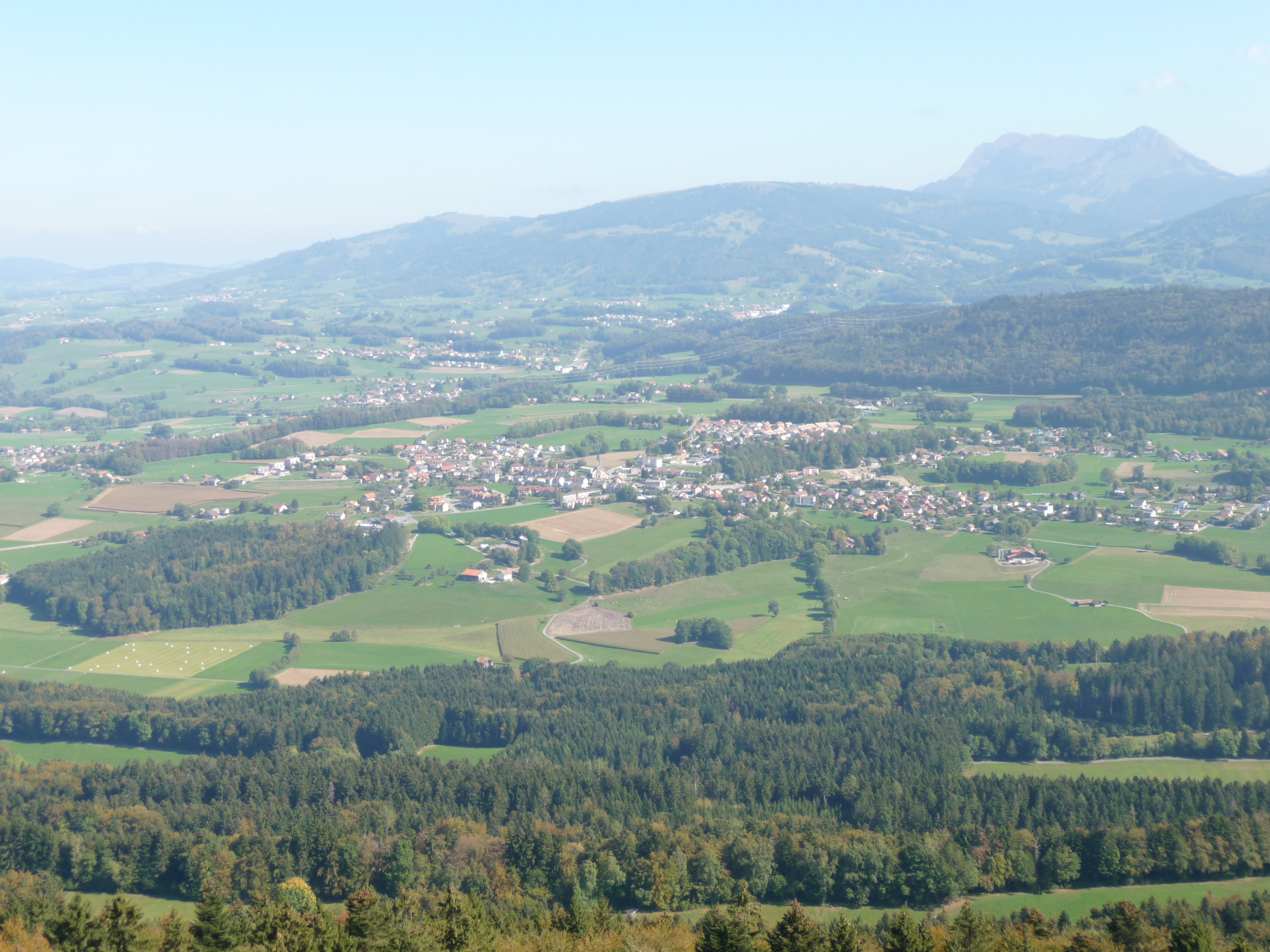
Village view (2009)

Attalens is first mentioned in 867 as Haltningum.

== Geography ==
Attalens has an area of 9.74 km^{2} (3.76 sq mi). Of this area, 5.84 km^{2} (2.25 mi^{2}) or 59.8% is used for agricultural purposes, while 2.64 km^{2} (1.02 mi^{2}) or 27.0% is forested. Of the rest of the land, 1.3 km^{2} (0.50 mi^{2}) or 13.3% is settled (buildings or roads), 0.03 km^{2} (7.4 acres) or 0.3% is either rivers or lakes.

Of the built up area, housing and buildings made up 8.5% and transportation infrastructure made up 2.4%. Power and water infrastructure as well as other special developed areas made up 1.3% of the area Out of the forested land, 23.8% of the total land area is heavily forested and 3.3% is covered with orchards or small clusters of trees. Of the agricultural land, 17.2% is used for growing crops and 40.9% is pastures, while 1.7% is used for orchards or vine crops. All the water in the municipality is flowing water.

The municipality is located in the Veveyse district, on the Vevey-Palézieux road.

== Coat of arms ==
The blazon of the municipal coat of arms is Argent a Lion rampant Gules and overall a Bendlet Vert.

== Demographics ==
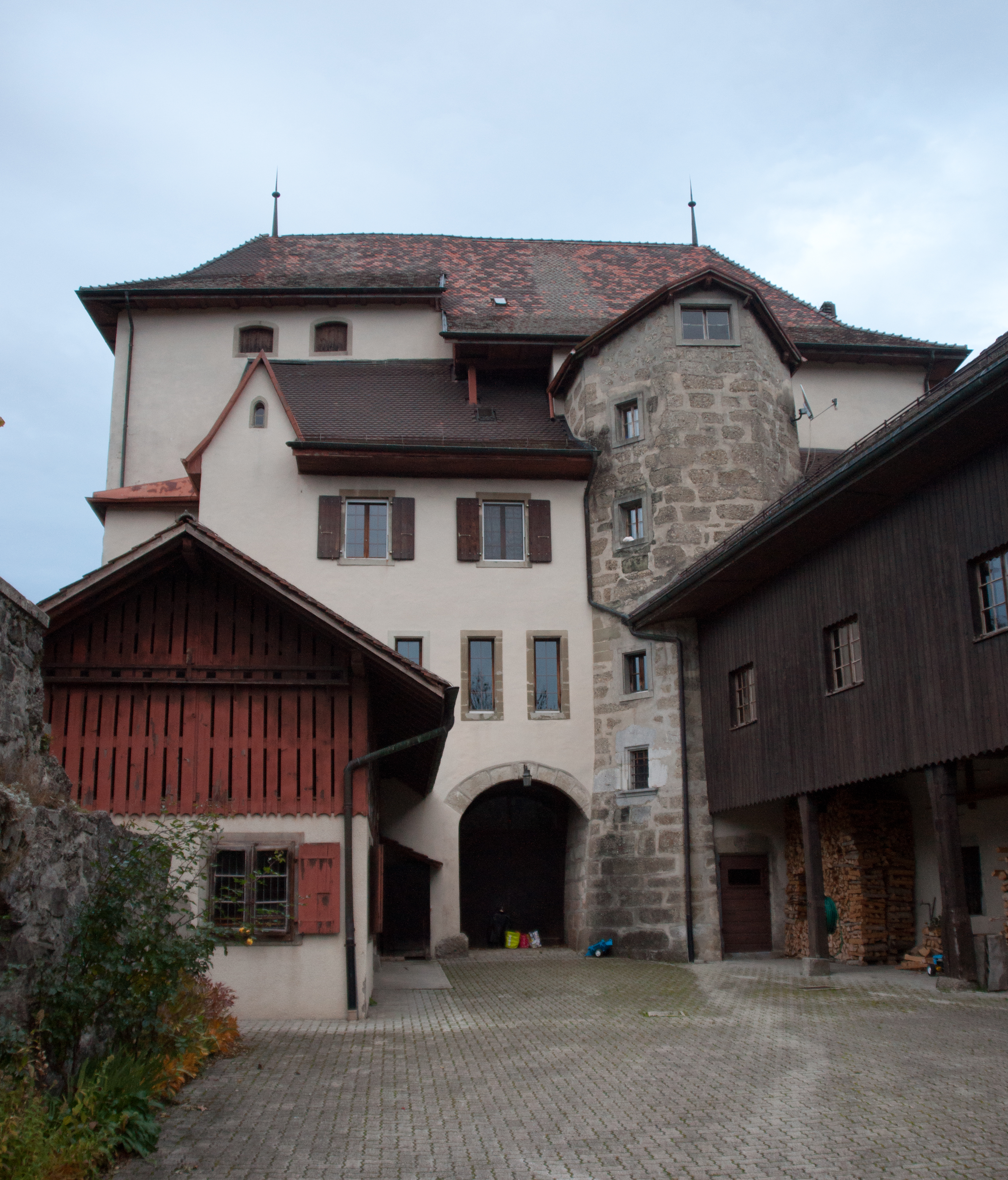
Attalens Castle

Attalens has a population (as of December 2020) of 3,580. As of 2008, 13.9% of the population are resident foreign nationals. Over the last 10 years (2000–2010) the population has changed at a rate of 28.4%. Migration accounted for 27.3%, while births and deaths accounted for 4.2%.

Most of the population (as of 2000) speaks French (2,076 or 92.2%) as their first language, German is the second most common (78 or 3.5%) and Portuguese is the third (30 or 1.3%). There are 19 people who speak Italian and 2 people who speak Romansh.

As of 2008, the population was 49.0% male and 51.0% female. The population was made up of 1,173 Swiss men (41.7% of the population) and 208 (7.4%) non-Swiss men. There were 1,231 Swiss women (43.7%) and 204 (7.2%) non-Swiss women. Of the population in the municipality, 715 or about 31.7% were born in Attalens and lived there in 2000. There were 400 or 17.8% who were born in the same canton, while 777 or 34.5% were born somewhere else in Switzerland, and 294 or 13.1% were born outside of Switzerland.

As of 2000, children and teenagers (0–19 years old) make up 28.9% of the population, while adults (20–64 years old) make up 58.8% and seniors (over 64 years old) make up 12.3%.

As of 2000, there were 958 people who were single and never married in the municipality. There were 1,075 married individuals, 123 widows or widowers and 96 individuals who are divorced.

As of 2000, there were 828 private households in the municipality, and an average of 2.6 persons per household. There were 216 households that consist of only one person and 69 households with five or more people. In 2000, a total of 810 apartments (91.7% of the total) were permanently occupied, while 53 apartments (6.0%) were seasonally occupied and 20 apartments (2.3%) were empty. As of 2009, the construction rate of new housing units was 10.9 new units per 1000 residents. The vacancy rate for the municipality, in 2010, was 0.26%.

The historical population is given in the following chart:

== Heritage sites of national significance ==
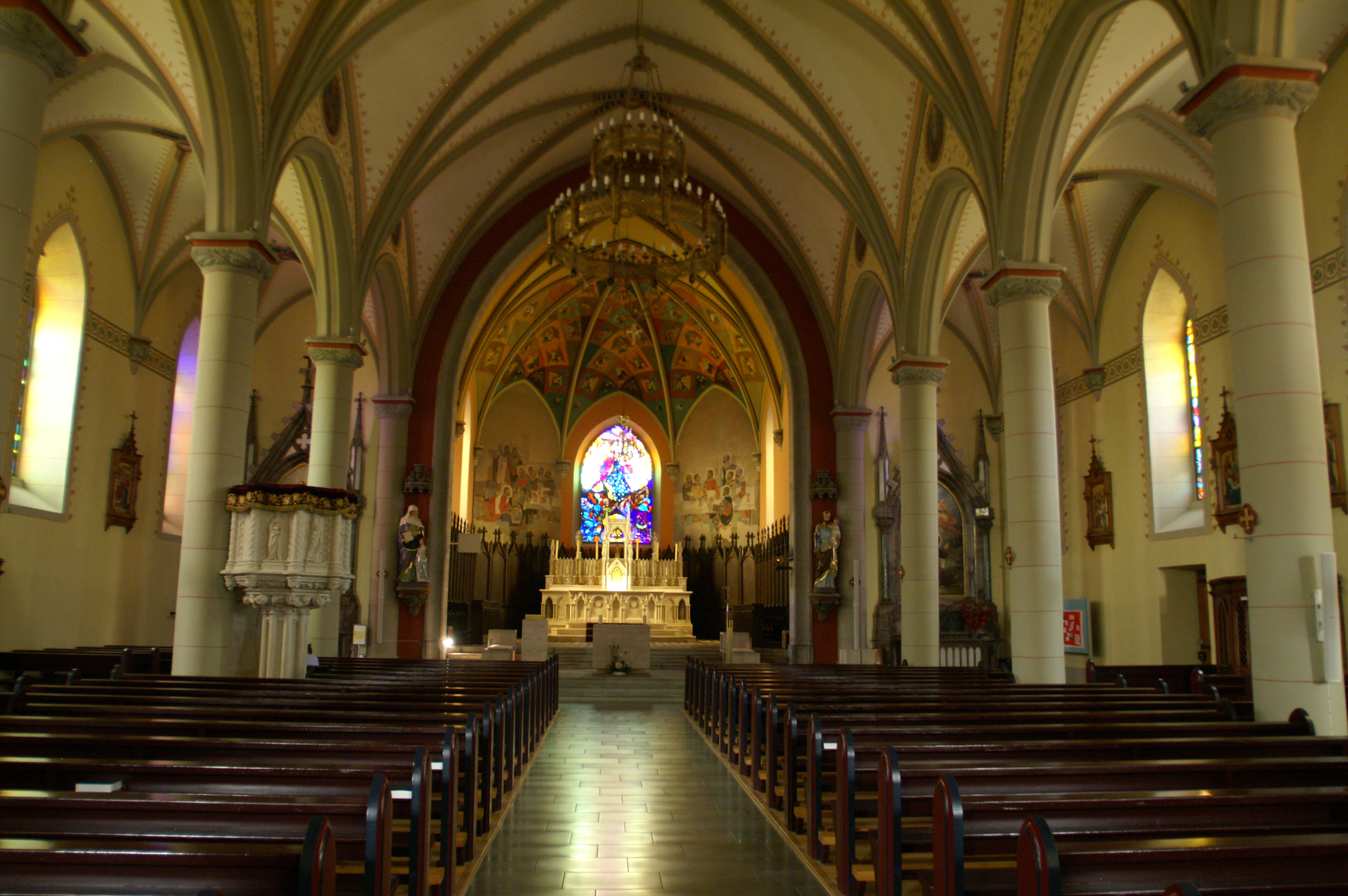
Interior of Notre-Dame de l'assomption

The Notre-Dame de l'Assomption Church is listed as a Swiss heritage site of national significance.

== Politics ==
In the 2011 federal election the most popular party was the SPS which received 29.3% of the vote. The next three most popular parties were the SVP (24.0%), the CVP (16.6%) and the CSP (8.7%).

The SPS improved their position in Attalens rising to first, from second in 2007 (with 28.0%) The SVP moved from first in 2007 (with 29.0%) to second in 2011, the CVP lost popularity (22.0% in 2007) and the CSP moved from below fourth place in 2007 to fourth. A total of 753 votes were cast in this election, of which 4 or 0.5% were invalid.

== Economy ==
As of 2010, Attalens had an unemployment rate of 3.4%. As of 2008, there were 50 people employed in the primary economic sector and about 19 businesses involved in this sector. 194 people were employed in the secondary sector and there were 29 businesses in this sector. 308 people were employed in the tertiary sector, with 50 businesses in this sector. There were 1,109 residents of the municipality who were employed in some capacity, of which females made up 44.1% of the workforce.

In 2008 the total number of full-time equivalent jobs was 458. The number of jobs in the primary sector was 39, all of which were in agriculture. The number of jobs in the secondary sector was 183 of which 62 or (33.9%) were in manufacturing and 120 (65.6%) were in construction. The number of jobs in the tertiary sector was 236. In the tertiary sector; 52 or 22.0% were in wholesale or retail sales or the repair of motor vehicles, 14 or 5.9% were in the movement and storage of goods, 23 or 9.7% were in a hotel or restaurant, 1 was in the information industry, 3 or 1.3% were the insurance or financial industry, 5 or 2.1% were technical professionals or scientists, 25 or 10.6% were in education and 92 or 39.0% were in health care.

In 2000, there were 222 workers who commuted into the municipality and 796 workers who commuted away. The municipality is a net exporter of workers, with about 3.6 workers leaving the municipality for every one entering. Of the working population, 11.8% used public transportation to get to work, and 69.9% used a private car.

== Religion ==
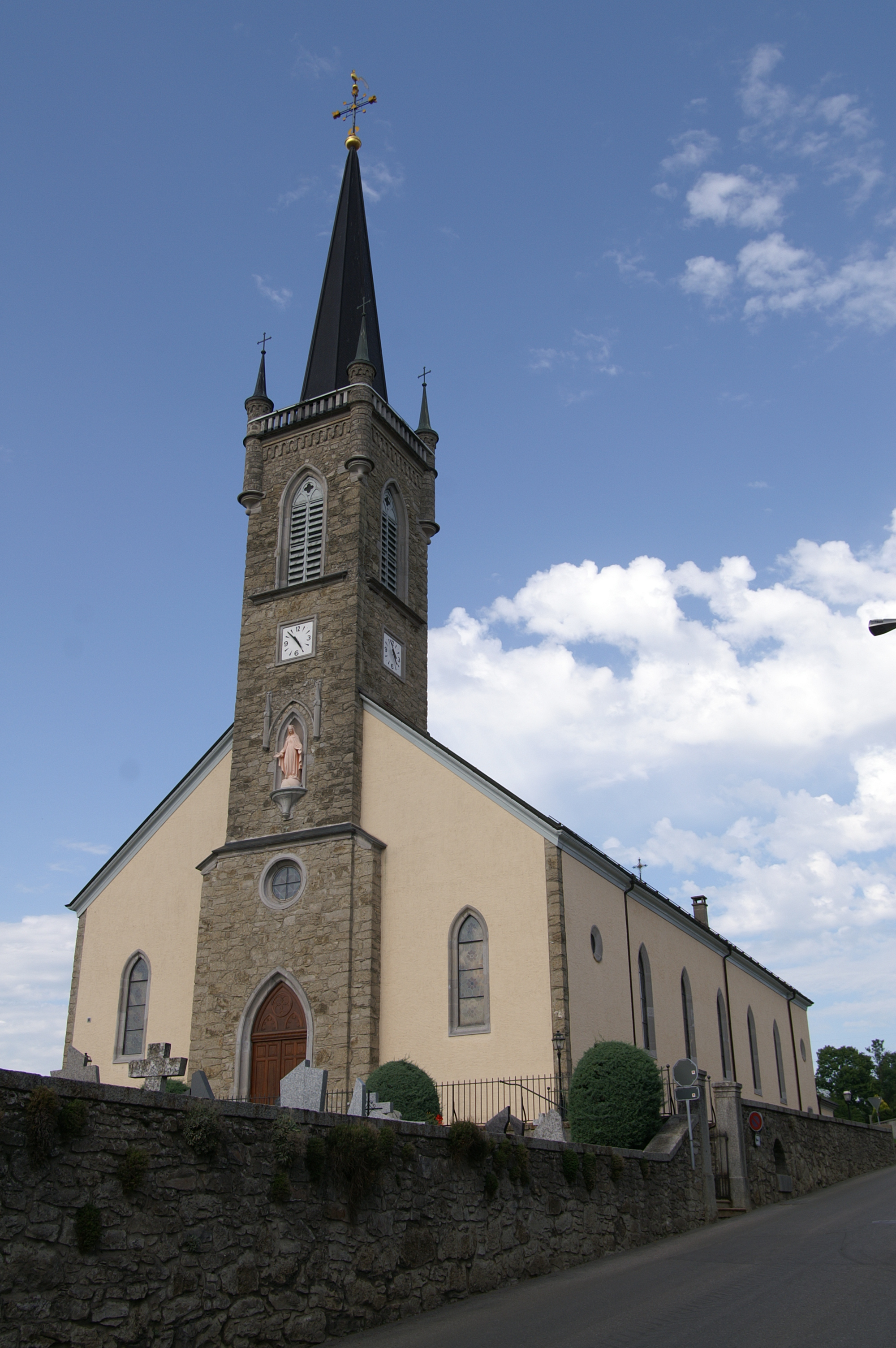
Notre-Dame de l'assomption Church

From the 2000 census, 1,432 or 63.6% were Roman Catholic, while 449 or 19.9% belonged to the Swiss Reformed Church. Of the rest of the population, there were 24 members of an Orthodox church (or about 1.07% of the population), there was 1 individual who belongs to the Christian Catholic Church, and there were 26 individuals (or about 1.15% of the population) who belonged to another Christian church. There was 1 individual who was Jewish, and 17 (or about 0.75% of the population) who were Islamic. There was 1 person who was Buddhist and 2 individuals who belonged to another church. 218 (or about 9.68% of the population) belonged to no church, are agnostic or atheist, and 94 individuals (or about 4.17% of the population) did not answer the question.

== Education ==
In Attalens about 760 or (33.7%) of the population have completed non-mandatory upper secondary education, and 278 or (12.3%) have completed additional higher education (either university or a Fachhochschule). Of the 278 who completed tertiary schooling, 55.4% were Swiss men, 28.1% were Swiss women, 9.0% were non-Swiss men and 7.6% were non-Swiss women.

The Canton of Fribourg school system provides one year of non-obligatory Kindergarten, followed by six years of Primary school. This is followed by three years of obligatory lower Secondary school where the students are separated according to ability and aptitude. Following the lower Secondary students may attend a three or four year optional upper Secondary school. The upper Secondary school is divided into gymnasium (university preparatory) and vocational programs. After they finish the upper Secondary program, students may choose to attend a Tertiary school or continue their apprenticeship.

During the 2010–11 school year, there were a total of 458 students attending 22 classes in Attalens. A total of 620 students from the municipality attended any school, either in the municipality or outside of it. There were 5 kindergarten classes with a total of 99 students in the municipality. The municipality had 17 primary classes and 359 students. During the same year, there were no lower secondary classes in the municipality, but 133 students attended lower secondary school in a neighboring municipality. There were no upper Secondary classes or vocational classes, but there were 56 upper Secondary students and 55 upper Secondary vocational students who attended classes in another municipality. The municipality had no non-university Tertiary classes, but there were 2 non-university Tertiary students and 6 specialized Tertiary students who attended classes in another municipality.

As of 2000, there were 46 students in Attalens who came from another municipality, while 194 residents attended schools outside the municipality.
