= Mont Pelerin Society =

Classical liberal intellectual society

- Abbreviation: MPS
- Formation: 1947; 79 years ago
- Type: Economic policy think tank
- Headquarters: Texas Tech University, Lubbock, Texas, U.S.
- Fields: Classical liberalism (early); Neoliberalism (later); Factions: Social market economy Ordoliberalism
- President: Deirdre McCloskey
- Revenue: $165,781 (2015)
- Expenses: $113,886 (2015)
- Website: montpelerin.org

The Mont Pelerin Society (MPS), founded in 1947, is an international academic society of economists, political philosophers, and other intellectuals who share a classical liberal outlook. It is headquartered at Texas Tech University in Lubbock, Texas, United States. The society advocates freedom of expression, free market economic policies, and an open society. Further, the society seeks to discover ways in which the private sector can replace many functions currently provided by government entities.

== History ==
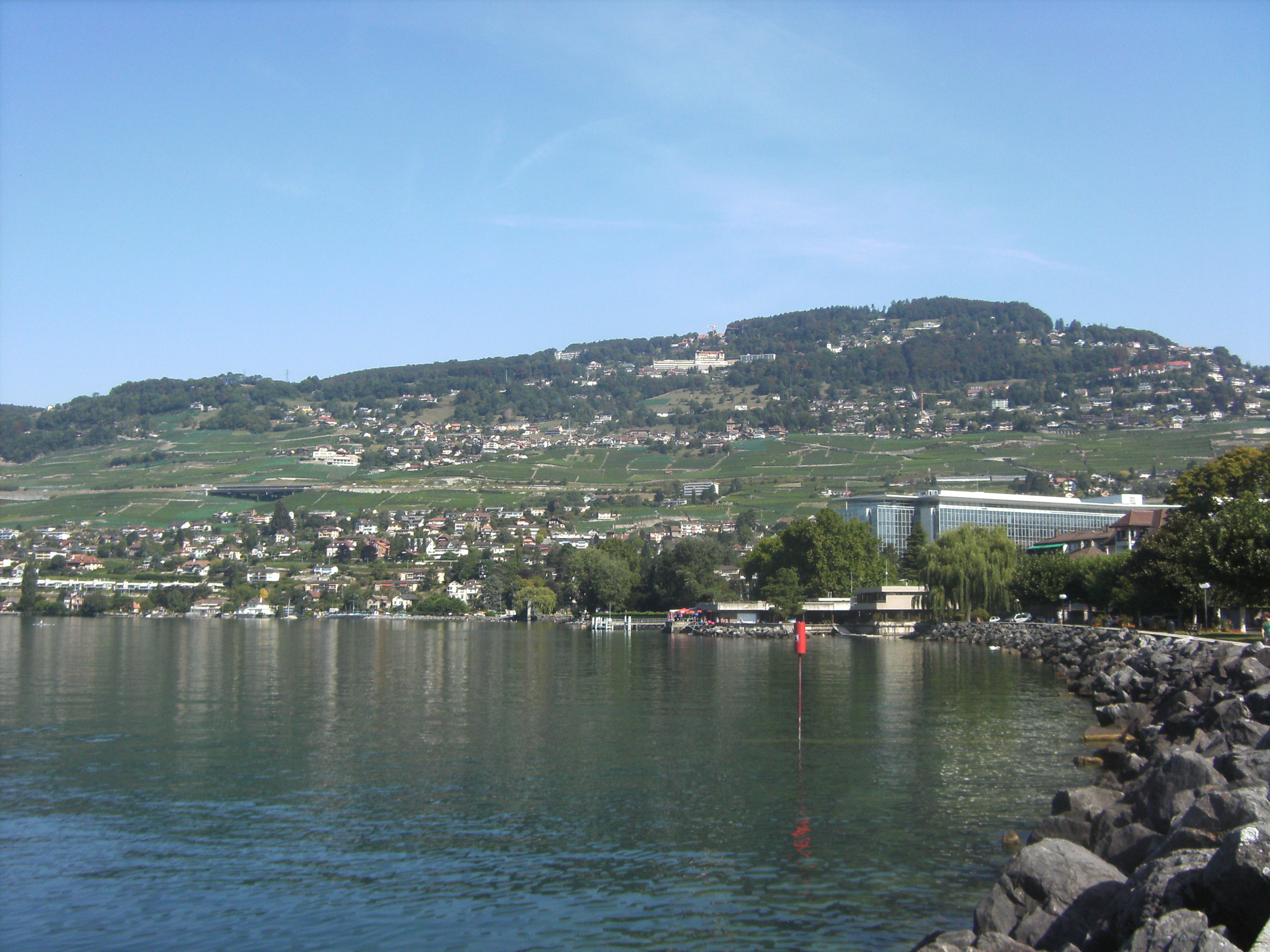
View of Mont Pèlerin from Vevey

The MPS was established on April 10, 1947, at a conference organized by Friedrich Hayek at the base of Mont Pèlerin on Lake Geneva. The conferees met as the International Trade Organization (ITO) charter was being drafted at the opposite end of the lake in Geneva, Switzerland.

The MPS was originally to be named the Acton-Tocqueville Society. Frank Knight protested against naming the group after two "Roman Catholic aristocrats," and Ludwig von Mises expressed concern that the mistakes made by Acton and Tocqueville would be connected with the society.

In its "Statement of Aims" on April 8, 1947, the scholars were worried about the dangers faced by civilization, stating:

Over large stretches of the Earth's surface the essential conditions of human dignity and freedom have already disappeared. In others they are under constant menace from the development of current tendencies of policy. The position of the individual and the voluntary group are progressively undermined by extensions of arbitrary power. Even that most precious possession of Western Man, freedom of thought and expression, is threatened by the spread of creeds which, claiming the privilege of tolerance when in the position of a minority, seek only to establish a position of power in which they can suppress and obliterate all views but their own.

The group also stated that it is "difficult to imagine a society in which freedom may be effectively preserved" without the "diffused power and initiative" associated with "private property and the competitive market" and found it desirable among other things to study the following matters:

1. The analysis and exploration of the nature of the present crisis so as to bring home to others its essential moral and economic origins.
2. The redefinition of the functions of the state so as to distinguish more clearly between the totalitarian and the liberal order.
3. Methods of re-establishing the rule of law and of assuring its development in such manner that individuals and groups are not in a position to encroach upon the freedom of others and private rights are not allowed to become a basis of predatory power.
4. The possibility of establishing minimum standards by means not inimical to initiative and functioning of the market.
5. Methods of combating the misuse of history for the furtherance of creeds hostile to liberty.
6. The problem of the creation of an international order conducive to the safeguarding of peace and liberty and permitting the establishment of harmonious international economic relations.

The group "seeks to establish no meticulous and hampering orthodoxy", "conduct propaganda" or align with some party. It aims to facilitate "the exchange of views [...] to contribute to the preservation and improvement of the free society."

Notably absent are the range of human and political rights traditionally embraced by liberals (including the right to form coalitions and freedom of the press).

In 1947, 39 scholars, mostly economists with some historians and philosophers, were invited by Friedrich Hayek to meet to discuss the state and possible fate of classical liberalism, his goal being an organization which would resist interventionism and promote his conception of classical liberalism. The first meeting took place in the Hotel du Parc in the Swiss village of Mont Pèlerin, near the city of Vevey, Switzerland.

Funding for the conference came from the William Volker Fund thanks to Harold Luhnow, the Bank of England owing to the help of Alfred Suenson-Taylor, the Foundation for Economic Education in Irvington-on-Hudson, New York and the Schweizerische Kreditanstalt (today known as Credit Suisse), which paid 93 percent of the total conference costs, 18,062.08 Swiss francs.

William Rappard, a Swiss academic, diplomat and founder of the Graduate Institute of International Studies, addressed the society's inaugural meeting. In his "Opening Address to a Conference at Mont Pelerin", Hayek mentioned "two men with whom I had most fully discussed the plan for this meeting both have not lived to see its realisation", namely Henry Simons (who trained Milton Friedman, a future president of the MPS, at the University of Chicago) and John Clapham, a British economic historian.

The MPS aimed to "facilitate an exchange of ideas between like-minded scholars in the hope of strengthening the principles and practice of a free society and to study the workings, virtues, and defects of market-oriented economic systems". The MPS has continued to meet regularly, the General Meeting every two years and the regional meetings annually. The MPS has close ties to the network of think tanks sponsored in part by the Atlas Economic Research Foundation.

== Influence ==
Hayek stressed that the society was to be a scholarly community arguing against collectivism while not engaging in public relations or propaganda. The society has become part of an international think tank movement and Hayek used it as a forum to encourage members such as Antony Fisher to pursue the think tank route. Fisher has established the Institute of Economic Affairs (IEA) in London during 1955, the Manhattan Institute for Policy Research in New York City in 1977 and the Atlas Economic Research Foundation in 1981. Now known as the Atlas Network, they support a wide network of think tanks, including the Fraser Institute.

Prominent MPS members who advanced to policy positions included the late Chancellor Ludwig Erhard of West Germany, President Luigi Einaudi of Italy, Chairman Arthur F. Burns of the Federal Reserve Board and Secretary of State George Shultz. Among prominent contemporary political figures, former President Václav Klaus of the Czech Republic and acting politicians, such as Prime Minister Ranil Wickremasinghe of Sri Lanka, former Chancellor of the Exchequer Sir Geoffrey Howe of the United Kingdom, former Italian Minister of Foreign Affairs and Minister of Defence Antonio Martino, Chilean Finance Minister Carlos Cáceres and former New Zealand Finance Minister Ruth Richardson, are all MPS members. Of 76 economic advisers on Ronald Reagan's 1980 campaign staff, 22 were MPS members.

Several leading journalists, including Pulitzer Prize-winning columnist Walter Lippmann, former radical Max Eastman (then roving editor at Reader's Digest), John Chamberlain (former editorial writer for Life magazine), Henry Hazlitt (former financial editor of The New York Times and columnist for Newsweek), John Davenport (holder of editorial posts at Fortune and Barron's) and Felix Morley (Pulitzer Prize-winning editor at The Washington Post), have also been members. Members of the MPS have also been well represented on the Committee for the Prize in Economic Sciences in Memory of Alfred Nobel.

Eight MPS members, Friedrich Hayek, Milton Friedman, George Stigler, Maurice Allais, James M. Buchanan, Ronald Coase, Gary Becker and Vernon Smith have won the Nobel Memorial Prize in Economic Sciences. Graeme Maxton, and Jørgen Randers note that it is no surprise that so many MPS members have won a Nobel Memorial Prize in Economic Sciences because the MPS helped to create that award, specifically to legitimize free-market economic thinking. In contrast, Nobel Prize winning economist Paul Romer attended a meeting of the MPS and found it "boring and depressing." One MPS member, Mario Vargas Llosa, received the Nobel Prize in Literature in 2010.

In the 2014 Global Go To Think Tank Index Report, published by Think Tanks and Civil Societies Program at the University of Pennsylvania, MPS was ranked ninth out of 55 for "Best Think Tank Conference".

== Past presidents ==
Numerous notable economic/political theorists have served as president of the MPS:

- Friedrich Hayek – United Kingdom, 1947–1961
- Wilhelm Röpke – Switzerland, 1961–1962
- John Jewkes – United Kingdom, 1962–1964
- Friedrich A. Lutz – Germany, 1964–1967
- Bruno Leoni – Italy, 1967–1968
- Günter Schmölders – Germany, 1968–1970
- Milton Friedman – United States, 1970–1972
- Arthur Shenfield – United Kingdom, 1972–1974
- Gaston Leduc – France, 1974–1976
- George Stigler – United States, 1976–1978
- Manuel Ayau – Guatemala, 1978–1980
- Chiaki Nishiyama – Japan, 1980–1982
- Lord Harris of High Cross – United Kingdom, 1982–1984
- James M. Buchanan – United States, 1984–1986
- Herbert Giersch – Germany, 1986–1988
- Antonio Martino – Italy, 1988–1990
- Gary Becker – United States, 1990–1992
- Max Hartwell – United Kingdom, 1992–1994
- Pascal Salin – France, 1994–1996
- Edwin Feulner – United States, 1996–1998
- Ramón Díaz – Uruguay, 1998–2000
- Christian Watrin – Germany, 2000–2002
- Leonard P. Liggio – United States, 2002–2004
- Victoria Curzon-Price – Switzerland, 2004–2006
- Greg Lindsay – Australia, 2006–2008
- Deepak Lal – United States, 2008–2010
- Kenneth Minogue – United Kingdom, 2010–2012
- Allan H. Meltzer – United States, 2012–2014
- Pedro Schwartz – Spain, 2014–2016
- Peter Boettke – United States, 2016–2018
- John B. Taylor – United States, 2018–2020
- Linda Whetstone – United Kingdom, 2020–2021
- Gabriel Calzada – Spain, 2021–2024

== Other notable participants ==
- Maurice Allais – French physicist and economist
- Karl Brandt – German-American agricultural economist
- Götz Briefs – German economist
- Ed Crane – Founder, Cato Institute
- Aaron Director – professor at the University of Chicago Law School
- Ludwig Erhard – Minister of Economics and Chancellor of postwar West Germany
- Frank Graham – American economist
- F. A. Harper – American economist
- Henry Hazlitt – American journalist
- Trygve Hoff – Norwegian economist and journalist
- Bertrand de Jouvenel – French philosopher and political economist
- Václav Klaus – Czech economist and politician
- Frank Knight – Chicago school economist
- Fritz Machlup – Austrian-American economist
- Salvador de Madariaga – Spanish diplomat and writer
- Loren Miller – American civic reformer and libertarian activist
- Ludwig von Mises – Austrian economist
- Felix Morley – American journalist
- Michael Polanyi – Hungarian/British chemist, economist and philosopher of science
- Karl Popper – Austrian/British philosopher
- William Rappard – American academic and diplomat
- Leonard Read – American founder of the Foundation for Economic Education
- Lionel Robbins – British economist
- Bellikoth Raghunath Shenoy – Indian economist
- Peter Thiel - German-American entrepreneur
- Herbert Tingsten – Swedish political scientist and journalist
- Cicely Wedgwood – British historian

== Other noted members ==
- Armen Alchian
- Martin Anderson
- John A. Baden
- Stephen J. Blackwood
- Danny Julian Boggs
- Rhodes Boyson
- William L. Breit
- Yaron Brook
- William F. Buckley Jr.
- Carlos Cáceres Contreras
- Steven N. S. Cheung
- Warren Coats
- Harold Demsetz
- Donald J. Devine
- Ross Eckert
- John Exter
- David D. Friedman
- Pierre F. Goodrich
- Hannes Hólmsteinn Gissurarson
- Otto von Habsburg
- Ronald Hamowy
- Steven F. Hayward
- George Hilton
- Israel Kirzner
- Charles G. Koch
- Alan Charles Kors
- Peter Kurrild-Klitgaard
- Henri Lepage
- Leon Louw
- Henry Maksoud
- Henry Manne
- Paul McCracken
- Marcel van Meerhaeghe
- Ernst-Joachim Mestmäcker
- Maurice Newman
- John O'Sullivan
- J. Howard Pew
- William H. Peterson
- Madsen Pirie
- Richard Posner
- Enoch Powell
- Alvin Rabushka
- Richard W. Rahn
- Alan Reynolds
- Ljubo Sirc
- Lowell C. Smith
- Beryl W. Sprinkel
- Richard L. Stroup
- Gordon Tullock
- Mario Vargas Llosa
- Leland B. Yeager

== See also ==
- Colloque Walter Lippmann
- Property and Freedom Society
