= Mont Pèlerin TV Tower =

Coordinates: 46°29′49.56″N 6°49′8.11″E

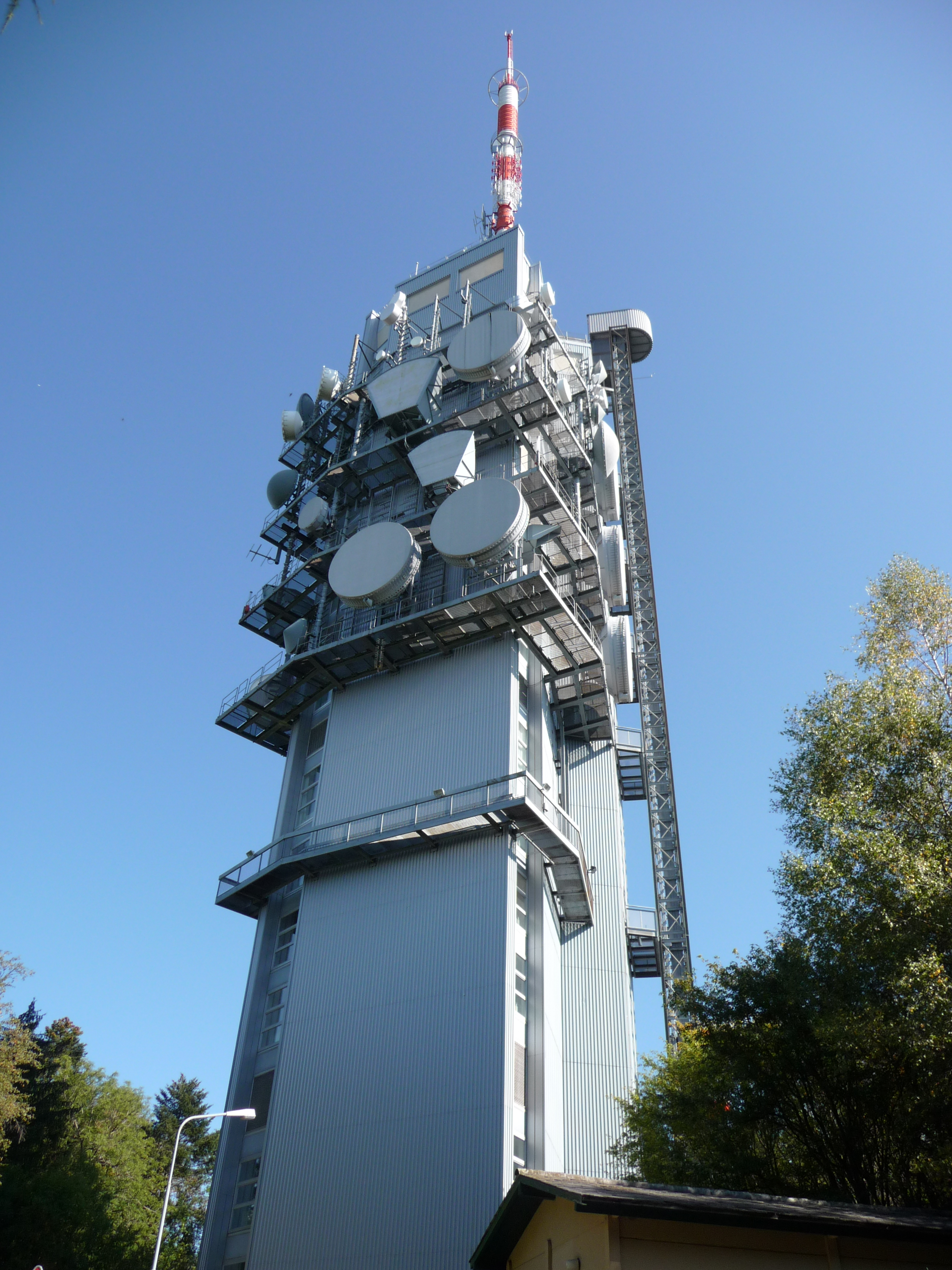

The Mont Pèlerin TV Tower is a transmission tower situated on Mont Pèlerin in the area of Chardonne, north of Vevey and is the only TV tower of Switzerland equipped with an observation deck, which is accessible by an elevator. Including this mast, the height of the tower is 122.6 metres.

== Structure ==
The structure of Mont Pèlerin TV Tower, whose foundations are 1075 meters above sea level, weighs 6000 tons and consists of 7500 cubic metres of concrete. The surface of the building, which is noticeable by its unusual architecture with its asymmetrical antenna platforms, is 3215 square metres. On the roof of the concrete structure of the tower stands the 58.31 metres high steel antenna mast, with a basement diameter of 2 metres and a weight of 97 tons.

== Observation deck ==
The observation deck (built in 1995) is situated at a height of 64.3 metres on the roof of the concrete construction. It is accessible by an elevator with glass walls (CHF 5 per person, as of August 2012).

== Earlier structures ==
In 1955, a radio relay link plant was installed in a wooden hut; and in 1963, a steel mast with TV transmission antennas was built.

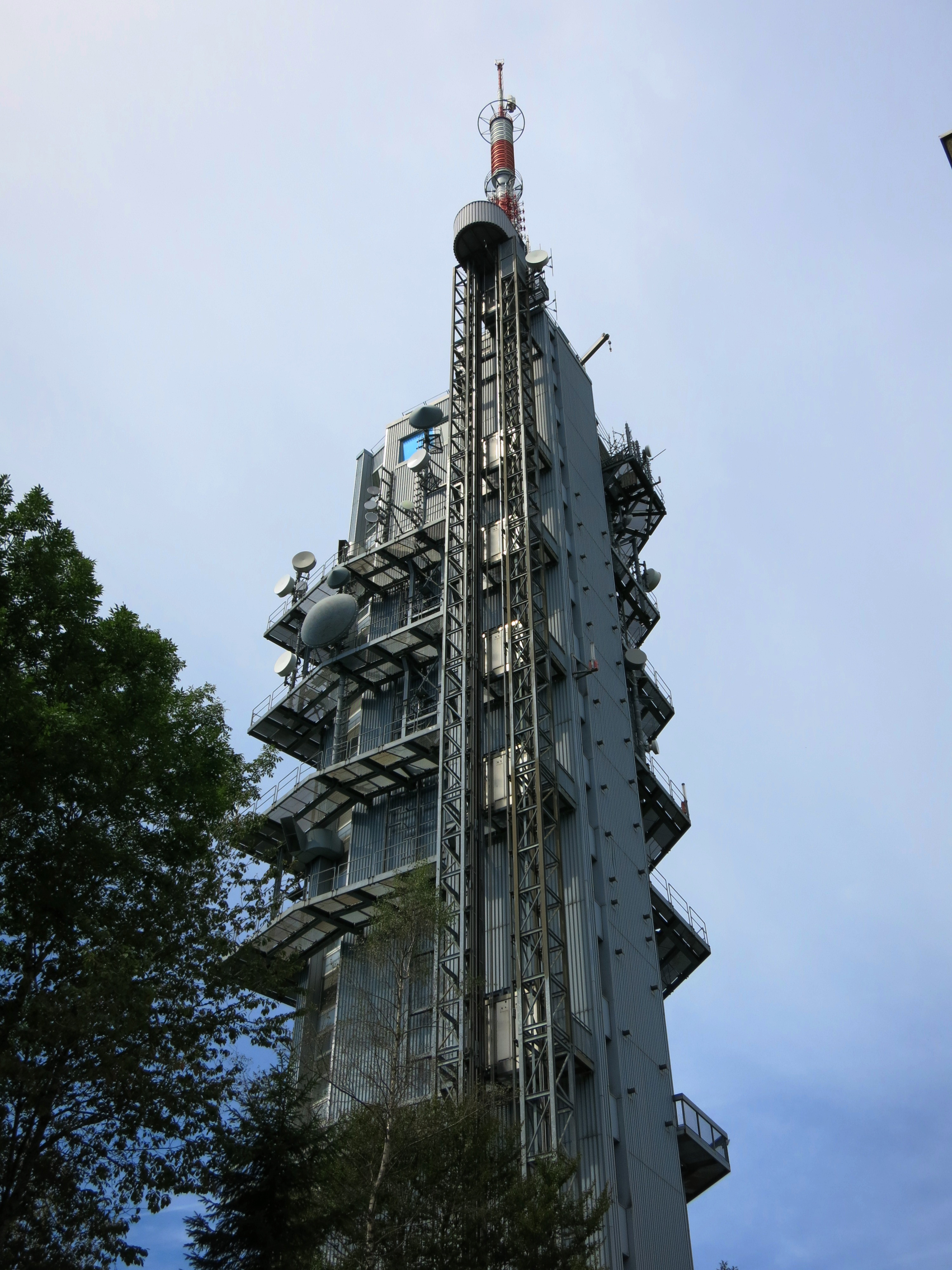
Mont Pélerin TV tower.
