= Henri Lepage (essayist) =

French essayist

- Born: 21 April 1941 (age 84)
- Occupation: Essayist

Henri Lepage (French: [ləpaʒ]; born 21 April 1941) is a French libertarian essayist.

He is most famous for his book Demain le Capitalisme ("Capitalism Tomorrow"), in which, in 1978, he presented an overview of the new libertarian thinkers. The book has been translated into a dozen languages. It is considered important for the early spread of neoliberalism in Sweden. Lepage is a member of the Mont Pelerin Society.
