= Ross Eckert =

American economist (1941–1994)

Ross Doud Eckert (November 11, 1941 – December 23, 1994) was the Boswell Professor of Economics and Legal Organization at Claremont McKenna College, the faculty of which he joined in 1979. He received his degrees from UCLA. He was one of the first to warn of the threat that AIDS posed to the blood supply, and a major goal in his life was cleaning up the blood supply. The matter affected him personally as he was a hemophiliac who contracted HIV/AIDS from a transfusion. He was also a member of the Mont Pelerin Society. Eckert worked with Ward Elliott on market-incentives to reduce congestion. He also worked to rescue the U.S. Laws of the Sea from degradation.
