= William Mullendore =

American businessman (1892–1983)

- Born: William Clinton Mullendore; May 18, 1892; Howard, Kansas, US
- Died: December 1, 1983 (aged 91)
- Education: Bachelor of Arts, University of Michigan, 1914; Doctorate of Law, University of Michigan, 1916
- Spouse: Esther Andrews (1922)

William Clinton Mullendore (May 18, 1892 – December 1, 1983) was an American conservative businessman who opposed the New Deal.

== Life ==
Mullendore was born in Howard, Kansas, on May 18, 1893, to Mary Eusebia Robison and John George Mullendore, and had nine siblings. He attended the University of Michigan, completing a Bachelor of Arts in 1914 and a Doctorate of Law in 1916; that same year, he was admitted to the Kansas Bar Association and began a general law practice in Winfield.

In World War I, Mullendore was a flight cadet. After the war, in 1920, he served as a special representative of the American Relief Administration, but was recalled by Herbert Hoover to work in the United States Food Administration, where he coordinated food being sent to the Allies. He wrote the official history of the administration, The History of the U.S. Food Administration, in 1921.

He returned to his law practice in 1921. From 1922 to 1923, he was Assistant Secretary of Commerce for the Hoover Administration, after which he established a general law practice in Los Angeles, which he ran from 1923 to 1928.

He married Esther Andrews in 1922, and they had a daughter in 1925.

In 1925, he became special counsel to the Southern California Edison, upgrading to general attorney in 1929. Mullendore was the executive vice president of the Southern California Edison company during the Great Depression; from 1945 to 1954, he was the president, after which he became chairman of the board.

He spoke at the Rotary Club in 1931 and at the American Bankers Association in 1932 against the National Recovery Administration. Leonard Read, assistant manager of the Western Division of the United States Chamber of Commerce, organized a meeting with Mullendore to convince him to support the NRA, but after an hour-long conversation, Read was persuaded to Mullendore's side. The two planned to organize businessmen to defend the "freedom principle" and capitalism.

Mulllendore became of trustee of Read's Foundation for Economic Education. In 1950, the Buchanan Committee, a subcommittee of the House of Representatives investigating lobbying, subpoenaed the FEE, as well as some of its funders, of which Mullendore was one; Mullendore refused to submit to a "harassing and burdensome inquiry" that he claimed Congress had no right to make, and faced no reprisal for his refusal.

Mullendore held various positions throughout his life, as a trustee of Scripps College, and as director of the California Bar Association, Los Angeles Chamber of Commerce, and later US Chamber of Commerce.

He died in 1983, and was buried in Forest Lawn Memorial Park in Glendale.
