= Granges, Switzerland =

Granges
- Municipality
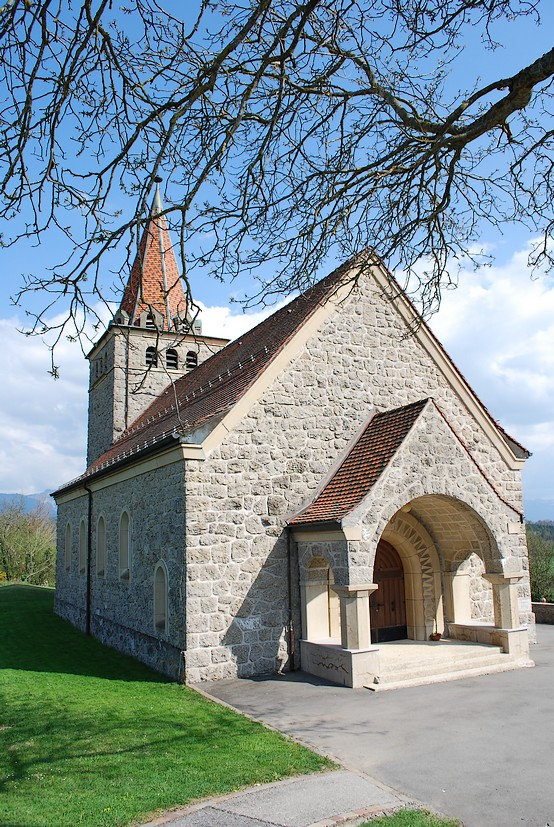
- Chapel of St Nicolas in Granges (Veveyse) village

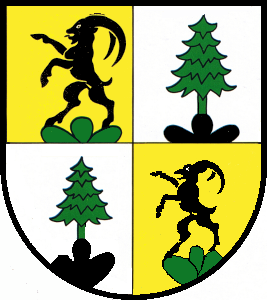
- Coat of arms
- Location of Granges
- Location within Switzerland Location within Canton of Fribourg
- Coordinates: 46°31′N 6°50′E
- Country: Switzerland
- Canton: Fribourg
- District: Veveyse

Government
  - Mayor: Syndic

Area
  - Total: 4.5 km^{2} (1.7 sq mi)
- Elevation: 753 m (2,470 ft)

Population (December 2020)
  - Total: 854
  - Density: 190/km^{2} (490/sq mi)
- Time zone: UTC+01:00 (CET)
  - Summer (DST): UTC+02:00 (CEST)
- Postal code: 1614
- SFOS number: 2328
- ISO 3166 code: CH-FR
- Surrounded by: Attalens, Bossonnens, Chardonne, Palézieux, Puidoux, Les Thioleyres
- Website: www.granges-veveyse.ch

Granges (French: [ɡʁɑ̃ʒ], Franco-Provençal: [ˈɡʁɑ̃dzɛ]), officially referred to as Granges (Veveyse), is a municipality in the district of Veveyse in the canton of Fribourg in Switzerland.

== History ==
Granges is first mentioned in 1134 as per campos Grangiarum.

== Geography ==
Granges has an area of 4.46 km^{2} (1.72 sq mi). Of this area, 3.08 km^{2} (1.19 mi^{2}) or 69.1% is used for agricultural purposes, while 0.9 km^{2} (0.35 mi^{2}) or 20.2% is forested. Of the rest of the land, 0.48 km^{2} (0.19 mi^{2}) or 10.8% is settled (buildings or roads).

Of the built up area, industrial buildings made up 1.8% of the total area while housing and buildings made up 5.8% and transportation infrastructure made up 2.9%. Out of the forested land, 18.4% of the total land area is heavily forested and 1.8% is covered with orchards or small clusters of trees. Of the agricultural land, 20.2% is used for growing crops and 41.0% is pastures, while 2.2% is used for orchards or vine crops and 5.6% is used for alpine pastures.

The municipality is located in the Veveyse district, on the north flank of Mont-Pèlerin.

== Coat of arms ==
The blazon of the municipal coat of arms is Quartered, first and fourth Or an Ibex rampant Sable on Coupeaux Vert and second and third Argent a Pine Tree Vert issuant from Coupeaux Sable.

== Demographics ==
Granges has a population (as of December 2020) of 854. As of 2008, 12.8% of the population are resident foreign nationals. Over the last 10 years (2000–2010) the population has changed at a rate of 22.5%. Migration accounted for 22.8%, while births and deaths accounted for 6.1%.

Most of the population (as of 2000) speaks French (582 or 92.5%) as their first language, German is the second most common (23 or 3.7%) and English is the third (10 or 1.6%). There is 1 person who speaks Italian.

As of 2008, the population was 50.4% male and 49.6% female. The population was made up of 341 Swiss men (43.2% of the population) and 57 (7.2%) non-Swiss men. There were 345 Swiss women (43.7%) and 47 (5.9%) non-Swiss women. Of the population in the municipality, 169 or about 26.9% were born in Granges and lived there in 2000. There were 162 or 25.8% who were born in the same canton, while 214 or 34.0% were born somewhere else in Switzerland, and 69 or 11.0% were born outside of Switzerland.

As of 2000, children and teenagers (0–19 years old) make up 23.1% of the population, while adults (20–64 years old) make up 63.3% and seniors (over 64 years old) make up 13.7%.

As of 2000, there were 248 people who were single and never married in the municipality. There were 321 married individuals, 29 widows or widowers and 31 individuals who are divorced.

As of 2000, there were 253 private households in the municipality, and an average of 2.5 persons per household. There were 63 households that consist of only one person and 22 households with five or more people. In 2000, a total of 241 apartments (87.6% of the total) were permanently occupied, while 30 apartments (10.9%) were seasonally occupied and 4 apartments (1.5%) were empty. As of 2009, the construction rate of new housing units was 3.7 new units per 1000 residents.

The historical population is given in the following chart:

== Politics ==
In the 2011 federal election the most popular party was the SPS which received 26.2% of the vote. The next three most popular parties were the SVP (26.2%), the CVP (15.7%) and the Green Liberal Party (6.2%).

The SPS improved their position in Granges rising to first, from third in 2007 (with 22.5%) The SVP retained about the same popularity (24.0% in 2007), the CVP moved from first in 2007 (with 28.3%) to third and the Green Liberals moved from below fourth place in 2007 to fourth. A total of 266 votes were cast in this election, of which 7 or 2.6% were invalid.

== Economy ==
As of 2010, Granges had an unemployment rate of 1.7%. As of 2008, there were 25 people employed in the primary economic sector and about 10 businesses involved in this sector. 209 people were employed in the secondary sector and there were 9 businesses in this sector. 24 people were employed in the tertiary sector, with 9 businesses in this sector. There were 319 residents of the municipality who were employed in some capacity, of which females made up 42.0% of the workforce.

In 2008 the total number of full-time equivalent jobs was 236. The number of jobs in the primary sector was 17, all of which were in agriculture. The number of jobs in the secondary sector was 199 of which 191 or (96.0%) were in manufacturing and 8 (4.0%) were in construction. The number of jobs in the tertiary sector was 20. In the tertiary sector; 9 or 45.0% were in wholesale or retail sales or the repair of motor vehicles, 4 or 20.0% were in a hotel or restaurant, 2 or 10.0% were in the information industry, 1 was a technical professional or scientist.

In 2000, there were 224 workers who commuted into the municipality and 255 workers who commuted away. The municipality is a net exporter of workers, with about 1.1 workers leaving the municipality for every one entering. Of the working population, 14.4% used public transportation to get to work, and 72.7% used a private car.

== Religion ==
From the 2000 census, 409 or 65.0% were Roman Catholic, while 122 or 19.4% belonged to the Swiss Reformed Church. Of the rest of the population, there were 5 members of an Orthodox church (or about 0.79% of the population), there were 2 individuals (or about 0.32% of the population) who belonged to the Christian Catholic Church, and there were 12 individuals (or about 1.91% of the population) who belonged to another Christian church. There was 1 individual who was Jewish, and 2 (or about 0.32% of the population) who were Islamic. There was 1 person who was Buddhist. 64 (or about 10.17% of the population) belonged to no church, are agnostic or atheist, and 16 individuals (or about 2.54% of the population) did not answer the question.

== Education ==
In Granges about 201 or (32.0%) of the population have completed non-mandatory upper secondary education, and 112 or (17.8%) have completed additional higher education (either university or a Fachhochschule). Of the 112 who completed tertiary schooling, 50.9% were Swiss men, 36.6% were Swiss women, 8.9% were non-Swiss men.

The Canton of Fribourg school system provides one year of non-obligatory Kindergarten, followed by six years of Primary school. This is followed by three years of obligatory lower Secondary school where the students are separated according to ability and aptitude. Following the lower Secondary students may attend a three or four year optional upper Secondary school. The upper Secondary school is divided into gymnasium (university preparatory) and vocational programs. After they finish the upper Secondary program, students may choose to attend a Tertiary school or continue their apprenticeship.

During the 2010–11 school year, there were no students attending school in Granges (Veveyse), but a total of 138 students attended school in other municipalities. Of these students, 12 were in kindergarten, 78 were in a primary school, 24 were in a mandatory secondary school, 13 were in an upper secondary school and 9 were in a vocational secondary program. There were a total of 2 tertiary students from Granges (Veveyse).

As of 2000, there were 80 students from Granges who attended schools outside the municipality.
