= Richard Cornuelle =

Political activist (1927–2011)

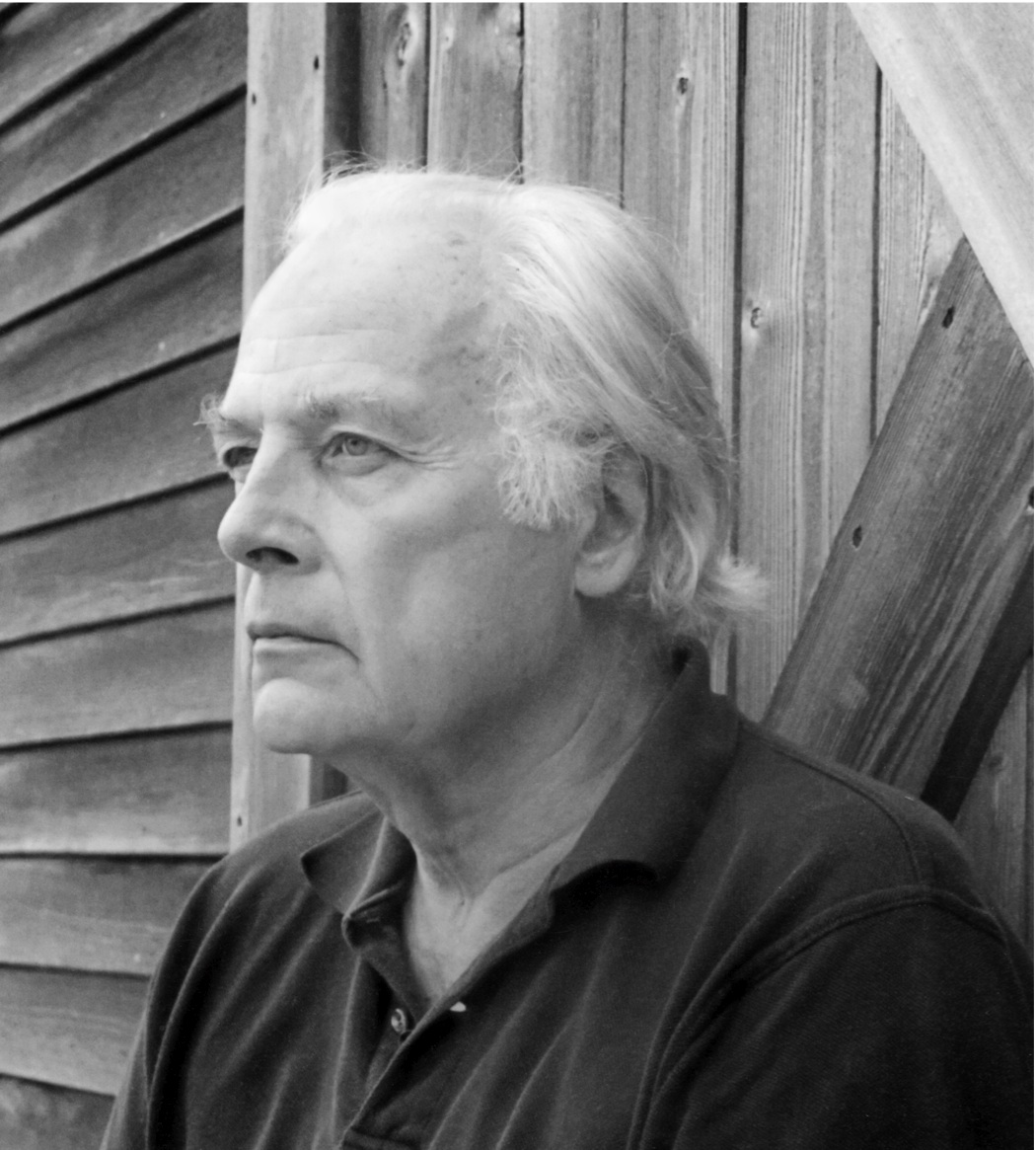
- Born: April 10, 1927
- Died: April 26, 2011

Richard Charles Cornuelle (April 10, 1927 – April 26, 2011) was a political activist, charity worker, author, and one of the first modern American libertarians.

== Early life ==
Cornuelle received a bachelor's degree from Occidental College, graduating Phi Beta Kappa in 1948, and proceeded to New York University for graduate work, where he studied with Ludwig von Mises, the émigré Austrian economist. Mises's students would soon create the modern libertarian movement. Cornuelle was also a member of the intimate circle around the émigré Russian novelist Ayn Rand. At one point, Rand demanded that Cornuelle take sides in an ideological dispute between herself and von Mises. Cornuelle refused, and Rand never spoke to him again.

Cornuelle initially worked for the William Volker Fund, which searched for libertarian scholars in need of support. He eventually parted ways with libertarians over what he saw as their dogmatism and lack of compassion.

== Independent sector work ==
After his break with the libertarians, Cornuelle worked as vice president and editorial director of the Princeton Panel, a center for the study of American capitalism, and as executive director of the National Association of Manufacturers. He also founded several nonprofit efforts aimed at helping the impoverished. Cornuelle was featured in a December 1964 Look magazine cover story that called him "a former right-wing anarchist who chopped his way out of dark ideology toward a combination of principle and humane concern." The magazine highlighted an organization that Cornuelle had created in 1958, the United Student Aid Funds. Competing against the federal government's nascent student loan program, Cornuelle's group reinsured bank loans to pay the college tuition of impoverished students. By the fall of 1964, 48,000 students were attending 674 colleges with loans reinsured by the organization. In 1968, Life magazine lauded Cornuelle's Center for Independent Action in Indianapolis, which had trained the "unemployable" and found them jobs with much greater success than had the federal Job Corps. The center was also renovating slum housing at a cost local banks had predicted was unachievable.

== Publications ==
In 1965, Cornuelle's first book, Reclaiming the American Dream, argued that associations of volunteers could effectively solve social problems without recourse to heavy-handed bureaucracy. Pollster George Gallup later said that this book sparked “the most dramatic shift in American thinking since the New Deal”. Cornuelle refined his ideas in two later books. De-Managing America (1976) argued that the inefficiency of bureaucratic management required a turn toward decentralized methods of solving social problems. Healing America (1983) criticized Keynesian macroeconomic policy and social spending as unsustainable over the long term, calling again for a revival of voluntary efforts to solve social problems. In a 1991 essay in the Times Literary Supplement, Cornuelle argued that the collapse of communism had also brought about the irrelevance of libertarians' most important argument: the claim that prosperity and communism were incompatible. This essay was later expanded into an article in the scholarly journal Critical Review

== Family ==
Cornuelle was born in Elwood, Indiana and died in New York City. His first marriage, to Sydney Walton, ended in divorce but produced three children: Suzanne Schutte, Jenny Krusoe, and Peter Cornuelle. Richard Cornuelle remarried on February 22, 1991, to Elizabeth K. Fonseca.
