= Bossonnens =

- Municipality
- Flag Coat of arms
- Location of Bossonnens
- Location within Switzerland Location within Canton of Fribourg
- Coordinates: 46°31′N 6°51′E
- Country: Switzerland
- Canton: Fribourg
- District: Veveyse

Government
  - Mayor: Syndic

Area
  - Total: 4.1 km^{2} (1.6 sq mi)
- Elevation: 751 m (2,464 ft)

Population (December 2020)
  - Total: 1,501
  - Density: 370/km^{2} (950/sq mi)
- Time zone: UTC+01:00 (CET)
  - Summer (DST): UTC+02:00 (CEST)
- Postal code: 1615
- SFOS number: 2323
- ISO 3166 code: CH-FR
- Surrounded by: Attalens, Ecoteaux (VD), Granges (Veveyse), Palézieux (VD)
- Website: www.bossonnens.ch

Bossonnens (French: [bɔsɔnɑ̃s]; Arpitan: Bossonens, locally Bossounin [bɔsuˈnɛ̃]) is a municipality in the district of Veveyse in the canton of Fribourg in Switzerland.

== History ==
Bossonnens is first mentioned about 1000 as Bucenens.

== Geography ==
Bossonnens has an area of 4.12 km^{2} (1.59 sq mi). Of this area, 2.93 km^{2} (1.13 mi^{2}) or 71.5% is used for agricultural purposes, while 0.65 km^{2} (0.25 mi^{2}) or 15.9% is forested. Of the rest of the land, 0.5 km^{2} (0.19 mi^{2}) or 12.2% is settled (buildings or roads).

Of the built up area, housing and buildings made up 6.8% and transportation infrastructure made up 3.2%. Out of the forested land, all of the forested land area is covered with heavy forests. Of the agricultural land, 26.3% is used for growing crops and 44.1% is pastures.

The municipality is located in the Veveyse district, on the Vevey-Oron road.

== Coat of arms ==
The blazon of the municipal coat of arms is Paly of Six Argent and Azure and on a Chief Gules three Mullets of Five Or.

== Demographics ==
Bossonnens has a population (as of December 2020) of 1,501. As of 2008, 14.9% of the population are resident foreign nationals. Over the last 10 years (2000–2010) the population has changed at a rate of 21.1%. Migration accounted for 14.4%, while births and deaths accounted for 7%.

Most of the population (as of 2000) speaks French (932 or 89.5%) as their first language, German is the second most common (41 or 3.9%) and Portuguese is the third (36 or 3.5%). There are 10 people who speak Italian.

As of 2008, the population was 47.6% male and 52.4% female. The population was made up of 511 Swiss men (39.6% of the population) and 103 (8.0%) non-Swiss men. There were 575 Swiss women (44.6%) and 101 (7.8%) non-Swiss women. Of the population in the municipality, 276 or about 26.5% were born in Bossonnens and lived there in 2000. There were 207 or 19.9% who were born in the same canton, while 375 or 36.0% were born somewhere else in Switzerland, and 151 or 14.5% were born outside of Switzerland.

As of 2000, children and teenagers (0–19 years old) make up 29.2% of the population, while adults (20–64 years old) make up 62% and seniors (over 64 years old) make up 8.8%.

As of 2000, there were 478 people who were single and never married in the municipality. There were 453 married individuals, 48 widows or widowers and 62 individuals who are divorced.

As of 2000, there were 412 private households in the municipality, and an average of 2.5 persons per household. There were 138 households that consist of only one person and 39 households with five or more people. In 2000, a total of 407 apartments (85.7% of the total) were permanently occupied, while 51 apartments (10.7%) were seasonally occupied and 17 apartments (3.6%) were empty. As of 2009, the construction rate of new housing units was 13.8 new units per 1000 residents. The vacancy rate for the municipality, in 2010, was 0.18%.

The historical population is given in the following chart:

== Heritage sites of national significance ==
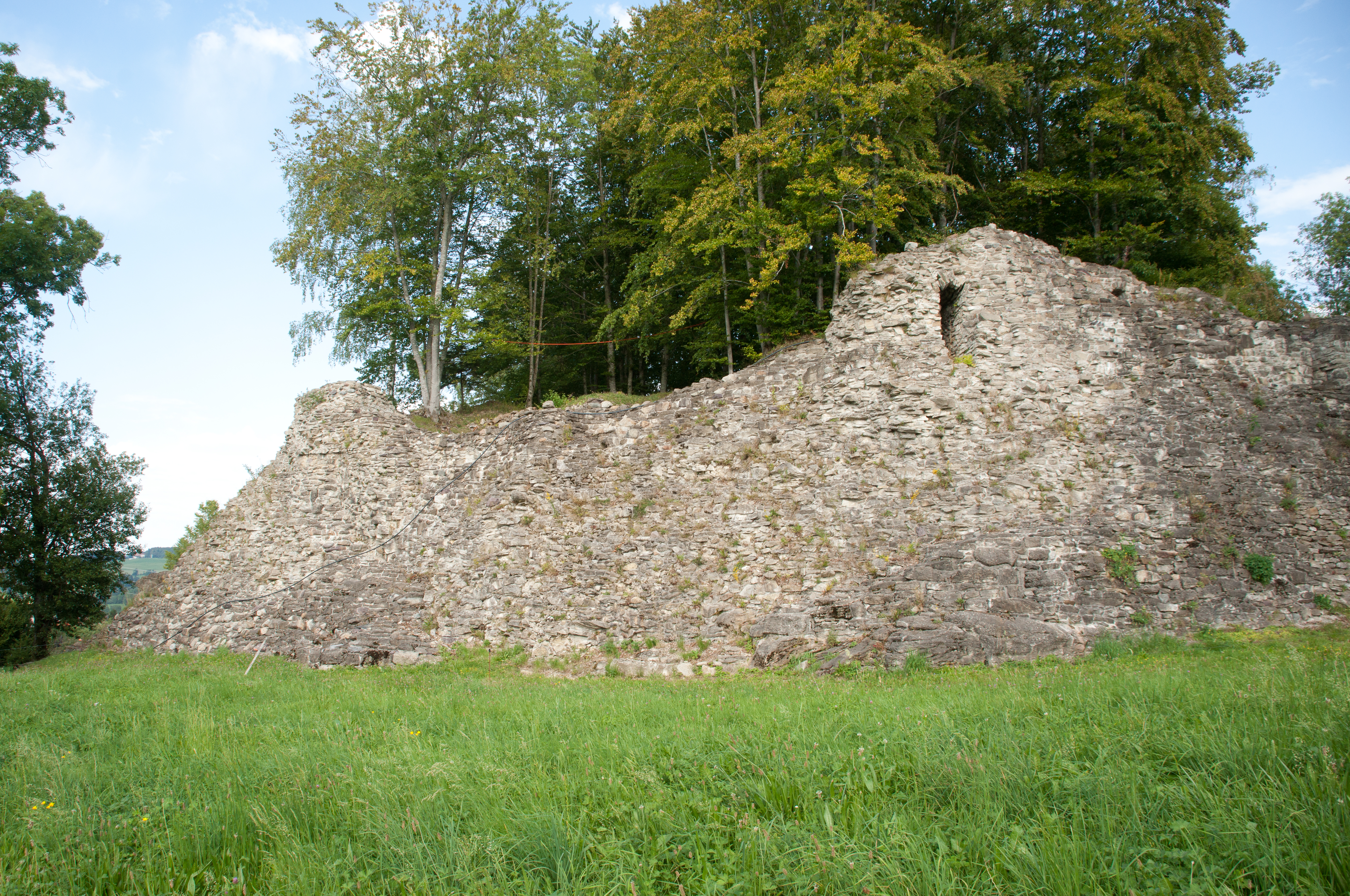
Ruins of the castle

The Ruins of the Château Et Du Bour is listed as a Swiss heritage site of national significance. This lies on the outskirts of the town, entering from Attalens, in a wooded area. A stream runs through this wood around the village.

== Activities ==
There is a nearby sports facility which includes squash, tennis and football. The town itself is centered around a small shopping center which includes the Swiss shopping chain Denner, a bakery and a hair dressing salon.

== Politics ==
In the 2011 federal election the most popular party was the SPS which received 34.9% of the vote. The next three most popular parties were the SVP (21.3%), the CVP (15.4%) and the Green Liberal Party (6.0%).

The SPS improved their position in Bossonnens rising to first, from second in 2007 (with 27.9%) The SVP moved from first in 2007 (with 28.6%) to second in 2011, the CVP retained about the same popularity (18.4% in 2007) and the Grünliberale moved from below fourth place in 2007 to fourth. A total of 297 votes were cast in this election, of which 7 or 2.4% were invalid.

== Economy ==
Surrounded mostly by farmland Bossonnens is mostly a farming village, with many people working in nearby Vevey, Montreux or Lausanne.

As of 2010, Bossonnens had an unemployment rate of 2.5%. As of 2008, there were 19 people employed in the primary economic sector and about 9 businesses involved in this sector. 136 people were employed in the secondary sector and there were 8 businesses in this sector. 102 people were employed in the tertiary sector, with 27 businesses in this sector. There were 549 residents of the municipality who were employed in some capacity, of which females made up 43.7% of the workforce.

In 2008 the total number of full-time equivalent jobs was 224. The number of jobs in the primary sector was 16, all of which were in agriculture. The number of jobs in the secondary sector was 128 of which 57 or (44.5%) were in manufacturing and 71 (55.5%) were in construction. The number of jobs in the tertiary sector was 80. In the tertiary sector; 28 or 35.0% were in wholesale or retail sales or the repair of motor vehicles, 11 or 13.8% were in the movement and storage of goods, 10 or 12.5% were in a hotel or restaurant, 13 or 16.3% were technical professionals or scientists, 8 or 10.0% were in education and 7 or 8.8% were in health care.

In 2000, there were 132 workers who commuted into the municipality and 419 workers who commuted away. The municipality is a net exporter of workers, with about 3.2 workers leaving the municipality for every one entering. Of the working population, 16.2% used public transportation to get to work, and 68.9% used a private car.

== Religion ==
From the 2000 census, 688 or 66.1% were Roman Catholic, while 191 or 18.3% belonged to the Swiss Reformed Church. Of the rest of the population, there were 7 members of an Orthodox church (or about 0.67% of the population), and there were 33 individuals (or about 3.17% of the population) who belonged to another Christian church. There were 23 (or about 2.21% of the population) who were Islamic. There were 2 individuals who were Buddhist and 1 individual who belonged to another church. 81 (or about 7.78% of the population) belonged to no church, are agnostic or atheist, and 31 individuals (or about 2.98% of the population) did not answer the question.

== Education ==
In Bossonnens about 388 or (37.3%) of the population have completed non-mandatory upper secondary education, and 89 or (8.5%) have completed additional higher education (either university or a Fachhochschule). Of the 89 who completed tertiary schooling, 61.8% were Swiss men, 23.6% were Swiss women, 5.6% were non-Swiss men and 9.0% were non-Swiss women.

The Canton of Fribourg school system provides one year of non-obligatory Kindergarten, followed by six years of Primary school. This is followed by three years of obligatory lower Secondary school where the students are separated according to ability and aptitude. Following the lower Secondary students may attend a three or four year optional upper Secondary school. The upper Secondary school is divided into gymnasium (university preparatory) and vocational programs. After they finish the upper Secondary program, students may choose to attend a Tertiary school or continue their apprenticeship.

During the 2010-11 school year, there were a total of 150 students attending 8 classes in Bossonnens. A total of 267 students from the municipality attended any school, either in the municipality or outside of it. There were 2 kindergarten classes with a total of 43 students in the municipality. The municipality had 6 primary classes and 107 students. During the same year, there were no lower secondary classes in the municipality, but 64 students attended lower secondary school in a neighboring municipality. There were no upper Secondary classes or vocational classes, but there were 29 upper Secondary students and 17 upper Secondary vocational students who attended classes in another municipality. The municipality had no non-university Tertiary classes, but there was one non-university Tertiary student and 5 specialized Tertiary students who attended classes in another municipality.

As of 2000, there were 71 students from Bossonnens who attended schools outside the municipality.

== Transportation ==
Bossonnens is quite accessible with the number 213 bus line from Vevey going every hour from 6:05 until 21:38. There is also a train station, with trains in one direction to the town of Palézieux, which is a major transport link, and in the other direction from Châtel-Saint-Denis, Bulle all the way to Montbovon.
