= Victoria Curzon-Price =

Swiss economist

Victoria Curzon-Price (born 1942) is a professor of economics.

== Career ==
She became a professor of economics at the University of Geneva in 1982, and was director of the university's now-defunct Institut universitaire d'études européennes from 1994 to 1998. Her academic work has encompassed international trade, economic integration, institutional competition and political economy. She has been involved with organizations that defend classical liberalism, namely as president of the Mont Pelerin Society from 2004 to 2006, board member of the Liberales Institut and president of the Institut Constant de Rebecque.

Curzon-Price was an elected member of the Grand Council of Geneva from 2008 to 2009.

She obtained a PhD in 1974 from the Geneva Graduate Institute where she studied under Harry Gordon Johnson.
