= Pedro Schwartz =

Spanish economist and politician (born 1935)

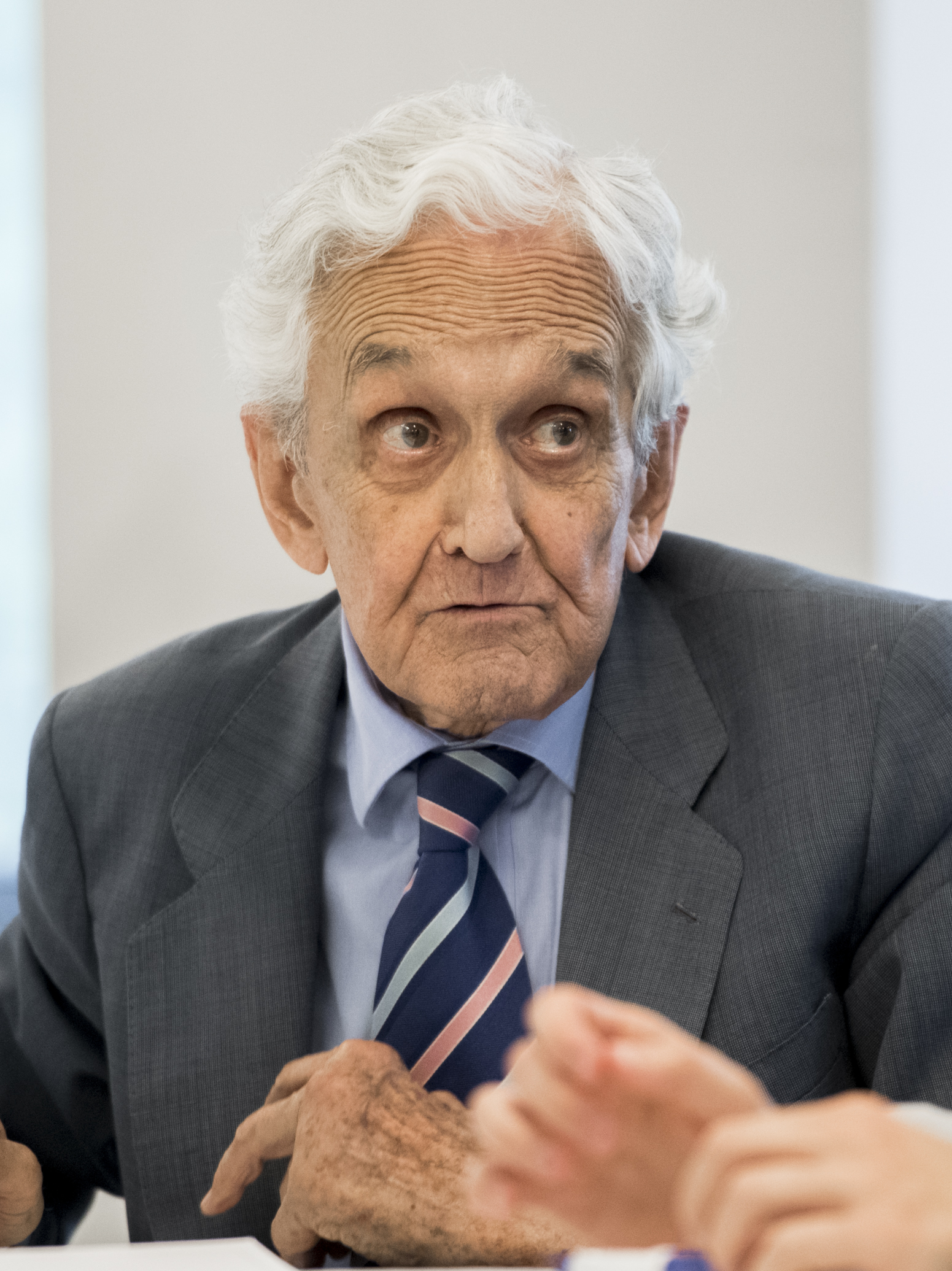
- Pedro Schwartz in May 2019
- Born: 30 January 1935 (age 91); Madrid
- Education: Complutense University of Madrid; London School of Economics; University of Buckingham
- Occupations: Economist, politician
- Spouse(s): Mercedes Juste Werner (after 1966) Ana Maria Bravo Zabalgoitia
- Children: 4

Pedro Schwartz Girón OBE (born 1935) is a Spanish economist and former politician.

== Early life ==
Schwartz was born on 30 January 1935 in Madrid. His father was Juan Schwartz Díaz-Flores, a diplomat who served as Spanish ambassador in Austria and contributed to the salvation of Jews during the Holocaust.

Schwartz graduated from the Complutense University of Madrid, where he received Bachelor of Arts and doctorate of law degrees. He received a master's degree and a PhD in economics from the London School of Economics.

== Career ==
Schwartz is the Fundación Rafael del Pino Research Professor of Economics at CEU San Pablo University. He is also a visiting lecturer in economics at the University of Buckingham. He serves as an adjunct scholar at the Cato Institute.

Schwartz joined the Mont Pelerin Society in 1977.

He was a member of the 2nd Congress of Deputies (1982–1986).

Schwartz became a member of the Real Academia de Ciencias Morales y Políticas on 22 February 2005.

He served as president of the Mont Pelerin Society between 2014 and 2016.

Schwartz was made Honorary Officer of the Order of the British Empire in 1990.

== Personal life ==
Schwartz married his first wife, Mercedes Juste Werner in 1966, and had one child. He has three children with his second wife Ana Maria Bravo Zabalgoitia (born 1945).
