= Ernst-Joachim Mestmäcker =

German lawyer (1926–2024)

Ernst-Joachim Mestmäcker (25 September 1926 – 22 April 2024) was a German lawyer. He was professor of private law at Georgetown University, Saarland University, University of Münster, Bielefeld University, University of Hamburg, and University of Michigan, Ann Arbor. From 1984 to 1990 he was director of the German Max Planck Society. He was on the editorial board of the academic journal ORDO and member of the European Academy of Sciences and Arts. He was a member of the Mont Pelerin Society. Mestmäcker died on 21 April 2024, at the age of 97.

== Awards ==
Mestmäcker was awarded the German Federal Cross of Merit, First Class, in 1981 as well as the order Pour le Mérite for accomplishments in the arts and sciences in 1997.

== Selected publications ==
- Mestmäcker, Ernst-Joachim (2007). A Legal Theory Without Law - Posner v. Hayek on Economic Analysis of Law. Mohr Siebeck. doi:10.1628/978-3-16-151072-4. ISBN 978-3-16-151072-4.
