= Warren Coats =

American economist (born 1942)

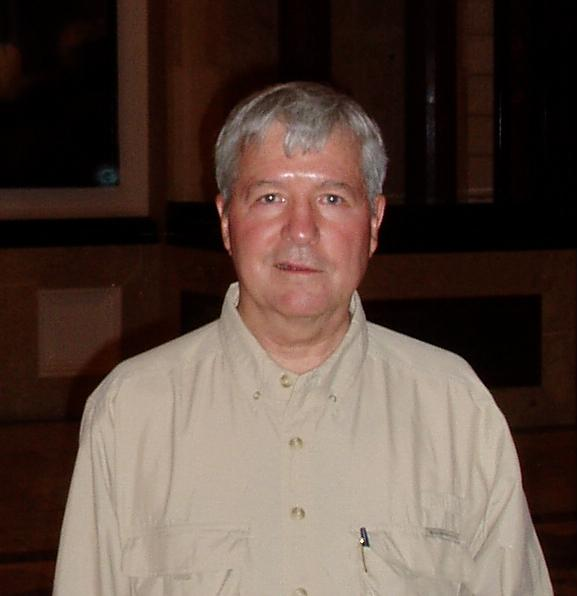
- Born: May 19, 1942 (age 84); Bakersfield, California
- Spouses: Louise Wilkinson (m. 1968; div. 1976) Victorino Briones (m. 2000)

Academic background
- Education: University of Chicago (PhD); University of California at Berkeley (BA)

Academic work
- Discipline: Monetary economics
- Institutions: University of Hawaiʻi; Illinois Institute of Technology; University of Virginia; International Monetary Fund; Cayman Islands Monetary Authority

Warren L. Coats Jr. (born May 19, 1942), is an economist specializing in monetary policy. He retired from the International Monetary Fund in May 2003 to join the board of directors of the Cayman Islands Monetary Authority. He is president of Economic Consulting, providing technical assistance to central banks, and until recently was adviser to the central banks of Afghanistan (for the IMF) and Kazakhstan (for the government of Kazakhstan).

== Early life ==
Coats was born and raised in Bakersfield, California, where he graduated from Bakersfield High School in 1960 in absentia while spending his senior year abroad with the International Christian Youth Exchange in the German village of Rasdorf. While in Germany he lived with the family of Albert Martin for a year and attended the Gymnasium in Hünfeld near Fulda.

From 1960 to 1962, Coats attended Bakersfield College, where he co-founded and edited the Weekly Blatt, an underground weekly campus newspaper dedicated to presenting conservative and libertarian political perspectives on current events.

During 1962–66 Coats attended the University of California at Berkeley and received a B.A. in economics in June 1966. At Berkeley, he served as president of several organizations, including the University Young Republicans (UYR), the University Conservatives, and his fraternity, Alpha Tau Omega. As president of the UYR, he was a member of the Free Speech Movement coordinating committee and allied with the presidents of the University Young Democrats, University Conservatives, and the Young People's Socialist League in an effort to restore free speech to the campus without violence.

In 1966–70 Coats studied economics at the University of Chicago. His doctoral dissertation was on The September 1968 Changes in 'Regulation D' and Their Implications for Monetary Supply Control, with Milton Friedman heading his dissertation committee. His Ph.D. was granted in 1972. While studying at Chicago, Coats taught part-time at the Illinois Institute of Technology (1966–1967 and 1968–1970). In 1968 he took a leave of absence to join Louise Wilkinson at the University of Hawaii in Honolulu, where both were assistant professors. They married in Hawaii before returning to Chicago to resume their graduate studies. Coats has two children, seven grandchildren, and three great-grandchildren. His partner for the last 20+ years is Dr Ito Briones, a physician and artist.

== Career ==
Coats was an assistant professor of economics at the University of Virginia from 1970 to 1975 and assistant chairman of the economics department in 1975. He joined the IMF at the beginning of 1976 and became chief of the Special Drawing Rights (SDR) division in the finance department in 1983. He is author of two books and editor or co-editor of three books on money and banking topics and more than two dozen articles on the SDR and other monetary topics.

In January 1992, Coats rejoined what is now the Monetary and Capital Markets Department (MCM) in the IMF to lead a technical assistance mission to Bulgaria followed by back-to-back missions to Kazakhstan and Kyrgyzstan. His career focused on an intensive program of developing new central banks and currencies that lasted beyond his retirement. He has led more than 70 missions that have provided practical advice and assistance to central banks around the globe often under crisis conditions. These include missions to Afghanistan, Albania, Bosnia and Herzegovina, Bangladesh, Bulgaria, Croatia, Czech Republic, Egypt, Hungary, Iraq, Israel, Kazakhstan, Kosovo, Kyrgyz Republic, Malta, Moldova, Nigeria, Slovak Republic, Slovenia, South Sudan, Turkey, the West Bank and Gaza Strip and the Federal Republic of Yugoslavia. He supervised the establishment of new central banks in Bosnia and Herzegovina and the West Bank and Gaza Strip, and the reestablishment, transformation, and development of the payment and banking systems in Kosovo, and helped Kazakhstan, Kyrgyzstan, and later Bosnia and Herzegovina and South Sudan introduce their own currencies.

Coats’ work on banking sector issues in Moldova, Bulgaria, Croatia, Turkey and Yugoslavia has provided him with the practical experience reflected in his several articles on banking sector soundness issues (including several papers on Bank Insolvency Law). He has also written on various monetary theory and policy issues, including digital money and inflation targeting. He edited a book on Inflation Targeting in Transition Economies published by the IMF and the Czech National Bank and co-edited a book on the same subject published by the Czech National Bank in 2003. The difficult negotiations he led for the IMF to establish a new central bank following the end of the civil war in Bosnia and Herzegovina are chronicled in his book, One Currency for Bosnia: Creating the Central Bank of Bosnia and Herzegovina, published in August, 2007, by Jameson Books.

Coats’ monetary advice has not always been trouble free. At a widely attended press conference in Kabul in January 2002, Coats was asked by Mark Landler, a New York Times reporter whether the IMF was recommending that Afghanistan replace the existing currency with U.S. dollars. He responded that dollarization was one of the options under consideration. When he failed to explain that if the policy to dollarize were adopted then the existing currency would be redeemed for dollars, the Afghani immediately depreciated about 25%. The next day acting central bank governor Abdul Fitrat detailed more fully how the adoption of dollarization (which was rejected in any event), would work and the exchange rate recovered fully within a day.

At the time he retired from the IMF in May, 2003, to become a Director of the Cayman Islands Monetary Authority (CIMA), Coats was the assistant director of the Monetary and Capital Markets Department (MCM). Coats was a visiting economist at the Board of Governors of the Federal Reserve System in 1979 and was seconded to the World Bank for one year to help write the 1989 World Development Report on the Financial System.

Following his IMF retirement, he continued providing technical assistance to central banks as a consultant with the IMF, BearingPoint, the Asian Development Bank, the U.S. Treasury, Overseas Development Institute, and Deloitte Consulting. His consulting assignments have included Afghanistan, Albania, Iraq, Kenya, Zimbabwe, Yemen, and South Sudan.

Coats is a member of Alpha Tau Omega (past president of Berkeley chapter), American Economic Association, The Mont Pelerin Society, Order of the Golden Bear, The Philadelphia Society (past member of board of directors), and the Western Economic Association International, (past member of the executive committee).

His honors include Kyrgyzstan's Certificate of Honor, presented by President Askar Akaev in Bishkek in 1997, in recognition of his work to prepare Kyrgyzstan to introduce its own currency, and he was inducted into Confrérie de la Chaîne des Rôtisseurs in Sofia, Bulgaria, in 1999. He has been a fellow of Johns Hopkins Zanvyl Krieger School of Arts and Sciences, Institute for Applied Economics, Global Health, and the Study of Business Enterprise since 2018. He received the 2019 Central Banking Award for Outstanding Contribution for Central Bank Capacity Building.

=== Recent employment ===
Coats ended seven years on CIMA in 2010 and joined the editorial board of the Cayman Financial Review soon thereafter. He provided technical assistance to the central bank of Afghanistan and was part of the IMF country team as a consultant, negotiating a program with Afghanistan that can be supported with an IMF Extended Credit Facility, including the resolution of Kabul Bank from 2005 to 2013. He was part of a Deloitte team financed by United States Agency for International Development helping the new government of South Sudan prepare for independence by establishing a new central bank and issuing a new currency from 2009 to 2011. Under contract with USAID, Coats served as the U.S. Treasury’s representative to the Coalition Provisional Authority during its final two months in Iraq (May–June 2004) and as an adviser to the Central Bank of Iraq.

Coats currently serves as director of the Africa Youth Peace Call (AYPC), and Universal Trading & Investment Co., Inc., and President of Reform International, which helped support Mohamad Machine-Chian and liberal thought in Iran. He is a visiting scholar in the Institute for Capacity Development Department of the International Monetary Fund (February 20, 2018 through April 30, 2019), and an Overseas Development Institute advisor to the UN OCHA on Yemen, October 2018 to March 2019.

Coats presented proposals for a hard SDR issued by a global currency board (Real SDR Currency Board) at a G20 High Level Seminar on the Reform of the International Monetary System in Nanjing, China, on March 30 of 2011, on May 4, 2011, in Astana, Kazakhstan, on July 1, 2011, in Buenos Aires, Argentina and at the May 20, 2019 Fort Worth, Texas, Mont Pelerin Society meeting.

== Books ==
- The Life of Warren C.: From the River to the Sea, All should be Free, August 13, 2024.
- My Travels To Kosovo (Warren's Travels Book 5), July 21, 2023.
- Palestine: The Oslo Accords Before and After – My Travels to Jerusalem (Warren's Travels Book 4), January 19, 2021.
- FSU: Building Market Economy Monetary Systems – My Travels in the Former Soviet Union (Warren's Travels Book 3), September 30, 2020.
- Afghanistan: Rebuilding the Central Bank after 9/11 – My Travels to Kabul (Warren's Travels Book 2), September 11, 2020.
- Iraq: An American Tragedy – My Travels to Baghdad (Warren's Travels Book 1), October 6, 2020.
- One Currency for Bosnia: Creating the Central Bank of Bosnia and Herzegovina, (Ottawa, Ill., Jameson Books), 2007.
- with Douglas Laxton, and David Rose, eds., The Czech National Bank's Forecasting and Policy Analysis System, (Prague: Czech National Bank), 2003.
- Ed., Inflation Targeting in Transition Economies: The Case of the Czech Republic, (Prague: Czech National Bank and Washington DC: International Monetary Fund), 2000.
- Special Drawing Rights – Operations and Role in Development Finance, Indian Council for Research on International Economic Relations, (New Delhi, Allied Publishers, LTD), 1990.
- with D.R. Khatkhate, eds., Money and Monetary Policy in Less Developed Countries: Survey of Issues and Evidence, (Oxford, England: Pergammon Press), 1980.

== Selected articles ==
- "Modern Monetary Theory: A Critique," Cato Journal, Vol. 39, No. 3, Sept. 30, 2019.
- "The IMF should adopt a 'real SDR'," Central Banking, Vol XXX, No 1, Sept., 2019.
- "Free Banking in the Digital Age," Banking and Finance Law Review, Issue 1, Volume 33.2 (2018).
- "Kazakhstan’s long path to inflation targeting", Central Banking, Feb. 28, 2017.
- "Real SDR Currency Board", Central Banking Journal, XXII.2 (2011).
- "Monetary Policy Issues in Post Conflict Economies," Peace and the Public Purse: Economic Policies for Postwar Statebuilding, eds. James K. Boyce and Madalene O’Donnell, (London: Rienner), 2007.
- with Marko Skreb, "Central Banking in Transition: An Overview of Main Issues Ten Years After," Revue D’Economie Financiere, 2002.
- "The Central Bank of Bosnia and Herzegovina: Its History and Its Issues," Central Banking, Monetary Policies, and the Implications for Transition Economies, ed. by Mario I. Blejer and Marko Škreb (Boston: Kluwer Academic Publishers, 1999).
- with Henry Schiffman, "Key Issues in the Reform of Central Bank Legislation," IMF Working Papers, 1995.
- "In Search of a Monetary Anchor: A 'New' Monetary Standard," International Center for Economic Growth, 1994.
- "The Weekend Eurodollar Game," Journal of Finance, Vol. XXXVI, No. 3 (June 1981).
- "Lagged Reserve Accounting and the Money Supply Mechanism," Journal of Money, Credit, and Banking, May 1976.
