= Harold Luhnow =

American businessman (1895–1978)

Harold W. Luhnow (September 25, 1895 – August 1978) was an American businessman, philanthropist, and political activist. He is most well known for his management of the influential William Volker Fund during the period between 1947 and 1964 in the United States. A staunch anti-New Deal conservative, Luhnow and a dedicated group of staffers directed the fund to support libertarian and conservative intellectuals and academics.

== Early life and work with the William Volker & Co. ==
Luhnow was a second-generation German-American born in Chicago, Illinois in 1895. He graduated from Kansas State University with degrees in agriculture and animal husbandry, and served in the U.S. Army before moving to Kansas City, Missouri in 1919. In Kansas City, Luhnow began working for his uncle, William Volker, a home furnishing manufacturer. Luhnow slowly worked his way through the ranks of the William Volker & Co. until he became president in 1937 following his uncle's retirement. During this period, Luhnow also increasingly took control of his uncle's charitable operations by directing more and more of the monies of the William Volker Fund to libertarian and conservative causes.

== Early political activism ==
During the 1930s, Luhnow became an active opponent of Kansas City's Pendergast political machine, and was exposed to libertarian thought through fellow reformer Loren Miller. Miller introduced Luhnow to intellectual heavyweights and public figures who shared the businessmen's hostility to machine politics. Luhnow began reading F.A. Hayek's influential book The Road to Serfdom and developed into a classical liberal. As his familiarity with and commitment to liberal economic ideas grew, Luhnow began using more and more of his influence over his uncle's charitable fund to give sizable contributions to libertarian and conservative causes.

== The William Volker Fund ==
When William Volker died in 1947, his will added $15 million of his assets to the already sizable William Volker Charities Fund. Luhnow took primary control of the trust. He also took control of William Volker & Co. In 1952, Luhnow moved the headquarters of the fund and the company to Burlingame, California.

Luhnow used Volker Fund assets to support bringing schools associated with the Austrian School of economics to U.S. institutions. He "paid [Ludwig von] Mises's salary at New York University; he paid F. A. Hayek's salary at the University of Chicago; he funded lectures that Milton and Rose Friedman turned into Capitalism and Freedom and he approved the grant that enabled Murray Rothbard to write Man, Economy and State. As early as 1946, Luhnow earmarked Volker Fund money to support Leonard Read and agreed to fund the establishment the Foundation for Economic Education, which became the first major post-war libertarian think tank. The following year he funded the founding conference of the Mont Pelerin Society. By the late 1950s, Luhnow had led the Fund to provide critical support for a host of political groups, including the Intercollegiate Studies Institute and the Institute for Humane Studies. In the 1960s Luhnow's leadership of the Fund became more and more erratic until he eventually fired most of its staff and much of the Volker Fund's remaining assets were given to the Hoover Institution at Stanford University. he died in August 1978
