= William Volker =

American philanthropist (1859–1947)

William Volker (/ˈvoʊlkər/; German: [ˈfɔlkɐ]; April 1, 1859 – November 4, 1947) was an entrepreneur who turned a picture frame business into a multimillion-dollar empire and who then gave away his fortune to shape much of Kansas City, Missouri, both through the William Volker Fund and anonymously, earning him the nickname of "Mr. Anonymous."

== Biography ==
Volker was one of six children born to Frederick and Dorothea Volker in Hanover, Kingdom of Hanover. He moved with his family to Chicago in 1871 and at age 14 took a job as a clerk at a dry goods store. Wanting to further his education, he began studying accounting at Professor J. Dyhrenfurt's business college in Chicago, where he was hired a few months later as a junior teacher. In 1876, he left the college and took a position as a bookkeeper for a large picture frame company owned by another German born immigrant, Charles Brachvogel. According to Volker, this was the turning point in his business career. When Brachvogel was killed in a buggy accident three years later, Volker helped the family keep the business running. But wanting to start his own picture frame business, he took his savings and relocated to Kansas City in 1882, founding the William Volker & Company at 6th and Delaware.

His picture frame wholesale business boomed, expanding to include a popular line of window shades and a large selection of home furnishings. Eventually, he would open branches in other major cities.

Although one of Kansas City's wealthiest residents by his mid 40s, Volker remained humble and unassuming. He lived on a modest house at 3717 Bell, earning him the moniker of "Mr. Anonymous of Bell Street."

Volker remained a bachelor until marrying Rose Roebke in 1911 at age 52. Returning from his honeymoon he announced he had put $1 million in his wife's name and that he planned to give away his remaining fortune.

He was to spend the rest of his life giving millions to various philanthropic ventures, often anonymously. Among his donations was 40 acres (160,000 m^{2}) and a house that was to start the University of Kansas City which became the University of Missouri-Kansas City. A majority of his wealth was left for the William Volker Fund, which would be administered by his nephew Harold Luhnow. He died in 1947 Volker is memorialized in Kansas City today at the William Volker Memorial Fountain.
