= Mont Pèlerin =

Mountain of the Swiss Plateau

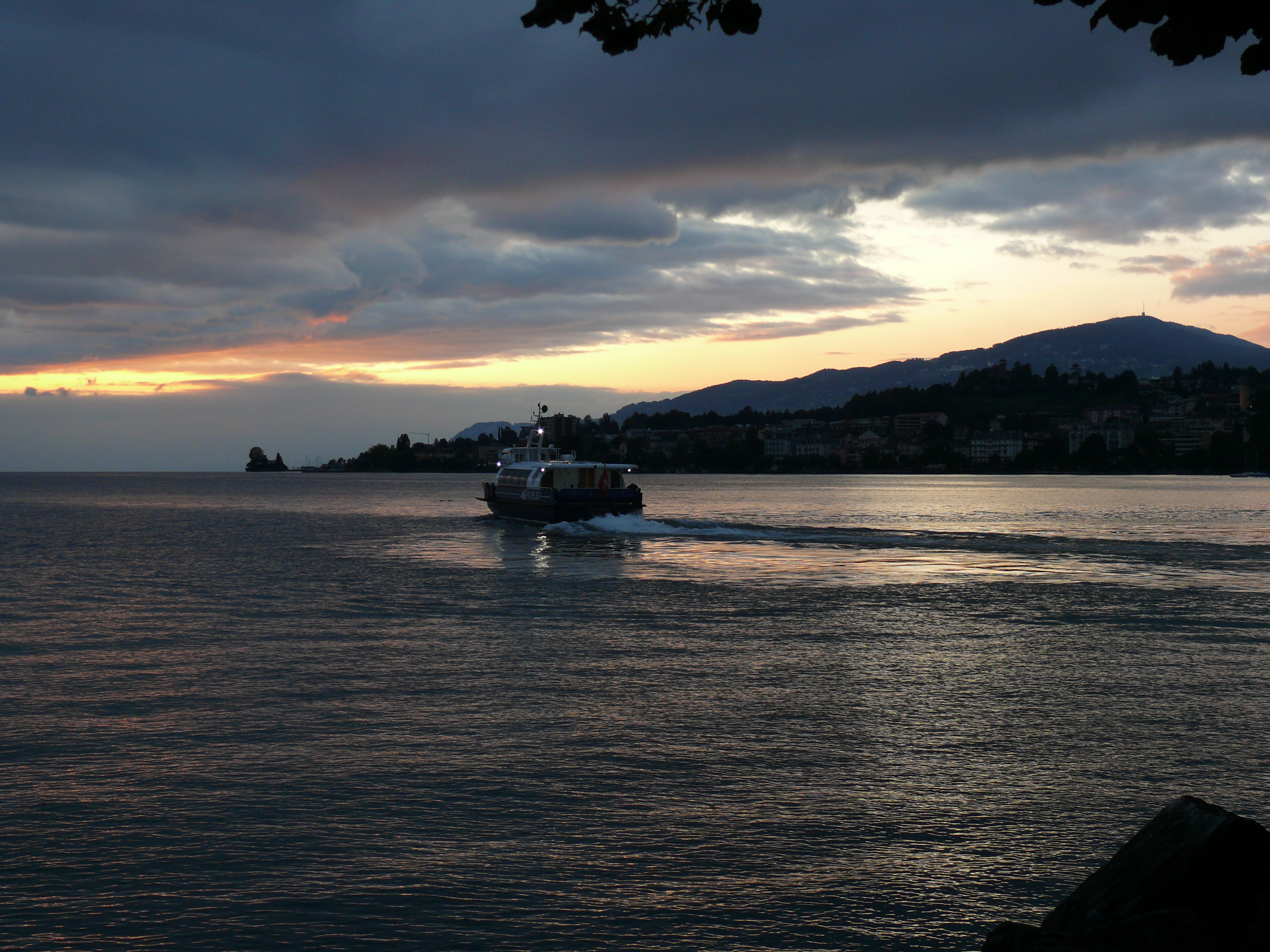
- View from Montreux (south side)

Highest point
- Elevation: 1,080 m (3,540 ft)
- Prominence: 327 m (1,073 ft)
- Coordinates: 46°29′49″N 6°49′09″E

Geography
- Location within Switzerland
- Location: Vaud, Switzerland
- Parent range: Swiss Plateau

Geology
- Mountain type: Puddingstone

Mont Pèlerin (/mɒnt ˈpɛlərɪn/; French: [mɔ̃ pɛlʁɛ̃]; 1,080 metres (3,540 ft)) is a mountain of the Swiss Plateau, overlooking Lake Geneva in the canton of Vaud. It lies north of Chardonne, over Vevey, the border with the canton of Fribourg running at the eastern foot of the mountain.

The Vevey–Chardonne–Mont Pèlerin funicular links Vevey and Mont Pèlerin. The Mont Pèlerin TV Tower is located on the wooded summit.

The Mont Pelerin Society was named after the resort, following its inception at a meeting there in 1947.
