= William Volker Fund =

Former charitable foundation

The William Volker Fund was a charitable foundation established in 1932 by Kansas City, Missouri, businessman and home-furnishings mogul William Volker. Volker founded the fund with the purposes of aiding the needy, reforming Kansas City's health care and educational systems, and combating the influence of machine politics in municipal governance. Following Volker's death in 1947, Volker's nephew Harold W. Luhnow continued the fund's previous mission, but also used the fund to promote and disseminate ideas on free-market economics. During Luhnow's tenure as the fund's primary manager, the William Volker Fund was one of the few libertarian organizations with significant amounts of money at its disposal, making it a key leader in developing the modern libertarian and conservative movements in the United States.

== William Volker and the establishment of the fund ==
William Volker was born in Hanover, Germany, in 1859, and his family immigrated to the United States in 1871 and settled in Chicago in October after the Great Fire destroyed portions of the city. According to his official biography, Volker "saw the operations of a vast spontaneous system of relief supported by charitable persons from every section of the world" (23). According to family tradition, the event convinced Volker of the power of private charity. Volker growing up as a German immigrant in Chicago was further motivated towards charity by the pietist Christianity passed on to him by his mother who stressed a passage from the Gospel of Matthew about anonymous giving.

As a young man, Volker moved to Kansas City, Missouri, where he started a home furnishings business, the William Volker & Co., which sold picture frames, blinds, and other home furnishings. In Kansas City he practiced daily giving – especially towards those whose needs were not met by organized charities. As his fortune increased in the early 1900s, he continued to increase the amount he gave to charity usually without taking any credit for the donations. Because of his secret charity, locals nicknamed Volker "Mr. Anonymous" and he became an important figure in Kansas City public life.

The Evangelical values Volker had been raised with favored hard work and frugality, assisting the needy but rejecting the concept of handouts. Welfare networks in Volker's native Germany, developing from guild traditions, provided a collective means for alleviating poverty where relief was traded for short work projects or was issued as short-term loans rather than a direct payment of unearned money. As a member of St. Peter's German Evangelical Church, Volker influenced by his religious upbringing lobbied city government for municipally operated relief agencies similar to ones operating in Germany.

Volker soon applied his organizational knowledge to his cause and created an efficient charitable operation. His civic agenda broadened to working towards progressive reform in Kansas City's government by using cooperative public/private social welfare agencies. At the time he described himself as a "Progressive and Christian Socialist".

Starting in 1908 he joined with those creating a Board of Pardons and Paroles that formed to try and counter the mayor's domination of those legal processes which could be abused for political ends. By successfully lobbying the city's government Volker's group gained official standing and funding by ordinance. The Board held that it was less likely that criminals would re-offend if they were employed, so made having a job a requirement of receiving parole – with the Board devoting many resources to finding jobs for prisoners.

In 1909 Volker and his associates expanded their mandate and became the Board of Public Welfare in an effort to fight squalor and poverty. They would seek to end poverty by researching its causes and educating the populace against them. They would train social workers, provide free legal services, loan money to the poor, and even inspect business for safety and "moral decency". If the city's funding of the board fell short, Volker would quietly cover the cost of the Board's programs.

Despite years of success when focusing on criminality in Kansas City, when the board expanded its scope to take on corrupt machine politics it soon ran into difficulty – specifically from the Pendergast brothers. By providing the poor (consisting mostly of immigrants, Catholics, and unskilled laborers) in the West Bottoms area of Kansas City, with coal fuel and other financial assistance the Pendergast brothers were able to rely on their grateful support for political issues. This arrangement allowed the Pendergasts to enrich themselves by managing the West Bottoms (an industrial and entertainment district infamous for the availability of gambling and other vices). Due to the machinations of the Pendergast machine, West Bottoms largely disregarded Prohibition. Seeing Volker's Board as a threat, "Boss Tom" Pendergast used his political connections to have the city drop its funding. This shifted the groups financial needs onto Volker. Pendergast also used his influence to get his supporters appointed to the Board, until by 1918 it had become little more than an extension of his political machine. In 1925 Volker would support reforms to the city charter, but Pendergast was again able to turn this to his advantage and take full control over the city government. Volker became disgusted with the turn of events and his biographer claimed he recalled the period bitterly "I've learned something about government...Government must be restricted to those activities which can be entrusted to the worst citizens, not the best." Rather than take on the Pendergast machine, Volker withdrew back to private charity.

In 1932, Volker set aside half of his fortune into the William Volker Charities Fund. The fund's articles of incorporation claimed it would "care for the sick, aged and helpless"; "provide means and facilities for the physical, mental, moral and spiritual betterment of persons"; "improve living and working conditions"; and provide "education and educational facilities" (209–210).

== Harold Luhnow and post-Volker management ==
Volker's health began deteriorating in the mid-1930s and being childless he turned over most of the duties in running his company to Harold W. Luhnow, a nephew born to his sister Emma. Luhnow, born in Chicago, was a second-generation German-American with a vastly different temperament and political ambition from his uncle. He neither possessed his uncle's intimate association with the German immigrant community nor shared its community values. Before coming to Kansas City to work with his uncle in 1919, Luhnow had served in the U.S. Army and graduated from Kansas State University with degrees in agriculture and animal husbandry. He would say "he learned about people from cattle." He abandoned his uncle's St. Peter's Church to join First Baptist Church favored by the city's elites.

Luhnow was open and unwavering in his opposition to the Pendergast machine. With his uncle's blessing Luhnow spent large amounts of Volker's funds to call for the city to adapt the policies advocated by the Civic Research Institute (CRI) which Volker had long been a backer of. The CRI called for replacing patronage and corrupt boss rule with an administration of "college-educated, career-professional manager". Luhnow and other businessmen joined CRI in a major get-out-the-vote effort in March 1934 that was met by violence by pro-Pendergast supporters bent on voter suppression culminating in "Bloody Tuesday".

Accounts of the Kansas City municipal election of March 27, 1934 recall that "Cars were demolished, women beaten, trucks burned, ballot boxes stuffed" where "numerous sluggings and reported kidnappings were recorded before noon as voters went to the polls in unprecedented numbers." The choice was between the Pendergast endorsed Democratic candidates against the reformist Citizens-Fusion candidates (drawn from Republicans and those Democrats that opposed Pendergast). The Citizens-Fusion party was headed by Dr. Ross Hill, former president of the University of Missouri who accused Pendergast's Democratic Mayor Bryce E. Smith of wholesale graft, fraud, and allowing collusion of the police department with gangsters. Also backing the idea of reform was the National Youth Movement (a Kansas City founded group whose national goal was to bring pressure against Pendergast). By the end of the day four people were slain and eleven wounded.

Pendergast's men regularly worked elections by "Smoking up the Precincts" where gangs would ride in high-powered black cars through the wards and precincts looking to beat supporters of opposing factions with brass knuckles, baseball bats, gun butts, and clenched fists. Already by early that morning these roving gangs had demolished and burned several cars being used by the Citizens-Fusion campaigns. They had also beat a man into critical condition with a wrench. As the day went on things continued to escalate. At one polling place a carload of hoodlums burst in and grabbed the black Democratic election judge and began beating him while the Republican judge fled out the backdoor. William Findley, a black Democratic precinct captain rushed to intervene. When met with pistols he drew his own — in the exchange of gunfire he was slain. At another site hoodlums kidnapped an election judge early in the day then returned in the afternoon and beat several election workers and a police officer. A.S. Williams, a candidate for the Citizens-Fusion ticket was kidnapped, threatened, and then returned to the polls. When reporting the event to the police his assailants leisurely drove by which he pointed out. The police got into their car and drove after them at about 10 miles an hour. Other than in the Black ward and the Southwest and Southeast areas the reformers were not viewed as a serious threat to Pendergast. Still, there was a split in the Shannon wing of his Democratic machine. Deputy Sheriff Lee Flacy supported the L.C. "Doc" Johnson faction of the Shannon wing and was electioneering at a polling place when he went to a nearby café for coffee. Three cars pulled up to the polling place containing twelve men who asked for Flacy. They were pointed to the café. Entering the café, John Gadwood (a supporter of the Pete Kelly faction of the Shannon wing) was told Flacy was in the backroom, which he entered. A pistol shot rang out as Gadwood fired into Flacy's stomach. The twelve then fled the café before being pursued by a wounded Flacy with his own gun drawn. A fire-fight occurred with Flacy shooting ex-boxer Larry Cappo in the head. Flacy was then slain by a blast from a shotgun one of the men had under his coat. P.W. Oldham, a 78-year-old hardware store owner, while locking up his shop was struck by a stray bullet in the fire-fight between Flacy and his murderers. One of the assailants the three cars flipped over while racing to escape the murder scene. The occupants when pulled from the car would tell police they had no idea how Cappo got into their backseat. Nine hours later Oldham and Cappo would die in side-by-side hospital beds. Gadwood was later convicted of murdering Flacy and served three years in prison. Findley and Oldham's killers were never charged. One fusion candidate, Arthur H. Wells was beaten by thugs. Justin Bowersock, a Kansas City Star reporter had his car struck by another vehicle and then shot at by the thugs inside it – they then chased him back to the newspaper's building before he managed to escape. The chauffeur for the editor of the Star was also beaten by hoodlums. The Associated Press reported the outcome of the vote saying "Big Tom Pendergast's Democratic machine rode to overwhelming victory today after a blood-stained election marked by four killings, scores of sluggings and machine gun terrorism." The machine lost two council seats to the reformers but otherwise dominated, thereby enhancing Pendergast's image state-wide.

Despite the electoral set-back, Luhnow continued to press for political reform using Volker's financing to fight Pendergast's political machine. Luhnow would not have to wait very long. In June 1936 Pendergast suffered a coronary thrombosis, or blood clot, while attending the National Democratic convention in Philadelphia. By August he was suffering from an intestinal blockage that required a colostomy when he returned in September to Kansas City. In an effort to prove themselves during the uncertainty caused by the bosses illness, machine ward and precinct leaders delivered electoral majorities to machine endorsed candidates at ridiculously high levels – triggering Federal suspicions. For example, one Pendergast's candidate outpolled his primary opponent for a state office by 19,201 votes to 13. Pendergast's son would later recall that the machine workers "got carried away and voted the sick, the dying and the dead." Within weeks a Federal Grand jury was convened to examine the 1936 election, headed by U.S. Distrtrict Court Judge Albert Reeves who had previously been denied a political career due to the machinations of the machine. The FBI brought forward 95 examples of ballot tampering. Indictments followed and throughout 1937 into 1938 juries found 259 of 278 individuals guilty. Election officials struck 60,000 bogus names from the Kansas City voter registration files. With Pendergast's power slipping, Luhnow and CRI were able to achieve some success in backing political reformers for the Kansas City Council in the 1938 elections. By May 1939, Pendergast reported to Leavenworth Federal Penitentiary to begin serving a 15-month sentence for income tax evasion. (He was released on probation a year later with three months off for good behavior and would die in 1945).

Luhnow's partnership with the CRI in the cause against the Pendergast machine introduced him to a nationwide network of similar civic organizations opposing machine politics and also calling for government efficiency and transparency. Many of these groups also opposed the welfare programs and federal intervention in local politics that resulted from the New Deal. During this period Luhnow met Loren "Red" Miller from Detroit's Bureau of Government Research foundation. The philosophy advocated by Miller is the source of much of modern American libertarianism. Miller's ideology arose from witnessing abuses of local government power, leading him to conclude that good government equated to minimal government – where charities and business replaced state social welfare. In 1941 Luhnow hired Miller to run the CRI. During his three-year tenure at the CRI, Miller introduced Luhnow to other intellectuals deeply committed to opposition of government bureaucracy and economic intervention.

When William Volker died in 1947, Luhnow took control of William Volker & Co. and also became the head of the William Volker Charities Fund's board of directors.

Under Luhnow's administration the fund shifted its focus away from charities in the Kansas City area and began pursuing a number of strategies for increasing the acceptance of Old Right and Austrian economics thought in the United States. During this period, Luhnow read books like F.A. Hayek's The Road to Serfdom and became a proponent of classical liberalism.

Luhnow was interested in theories of political economy that are generally called "libertarian" or "classical liberal," but at various times have been called "Conservative," "neoliberal," "right-wing radical," "eighteenth- and nineteenth-century liberal," or Straussian. As Luhnow's commitment to these ideas grew, he used the Volker Fund to give sizable contributions to libertarian and conservative causes. The Fund was instrumental in bringing Friedrich Hayek to the University of Chicago. It also helped support many other classical liberal scholars who at the time could not obtain positions in American universities, such as Ludwig von Mises and Aaron Director. Through its subsidiary the National Book Foundation, the Volker Fund gave away books authored by libertarian and conservative academics to college libraries throughout the U.S. The National Book Foundation distributed books by wide range of influential authors, including Eugen von Böhm-Bawerk, Gordon H. Clark, Hayek, Mises, Roscoe Pound, Leo Strauss, Eric Voegelin, and many others.

Under Luhnow's management, the fund helped the then small minority of Old Right scholars to meet, discuss, and exchange ideas. Milton Friedman's Capitalism and Freedom, Bruno Leoni's Freedom and the Law, and Hayek's Constitution of Liberty were all influenced by the ideas discussed at such meetings. Among its most significant contributions to such academic conferences, the fund supported North American participation at the first Mont Pèlerin Society meeting in 1947.

Under the directorship of "master recruiter" F. A. Harper, the fund systematically recruited a number of young libertarian and conservative scholars. These researchers and staffers eventually became important figures in American right-wing. Notable staffers included a young Murray Rothbard who began working for the Volker Fund in 1951 and wrote book reviews for the Fund until 1962. Rose Wilder Lane also contributed book reviews. Prominent Christian Right pioneers Rousas John Rushdoony and Gary North also gained early notoriety because of their association with the fund.

In addition to its own activities, the Volker Fund also helped support the formation of various complementary institutions, including the Intercollegiate Society of Individualists (ISI), which was later renamed Intercollegiate Studies Institute, and the Foundation for Economic Education (FEE). It also worked closely with similar charitable endeavors, such as the Earhart Foundation and the Relm Foundation.

In the 1960s the Volker company and the Fund moved to Burlingame, California. The Fund was dissolved after Luhnow's death in 1978, and its assets distributed to local Kansas City charities and to the Hoover Institution of Stanford University.

== Controversy and collapse ==
In the early 1960s, Luhnow's management of the fund became increasingly inconsistent, and in early 1963 he suddenly fired most of his staff, including Harper and Rothbard. Harper continued the basic nature and spirit of his Volker Fund work by creating the Institute for Humane Studies. Luhnow hired Ivan R. Bierly, an ex-Foundation for Economic Education senior staffer. Luhnow reorganized the Volker Fund as the Center for American Studies and ended the fund's charitable commitments to Kansas City institutions. Bierly recruited William T. Couch, R. J. Rushdoony, and David Leslie Hoggan to run the new center. Rushdoony hired his future son-in-law, Gary North, as a summer intern in 1963.

Immediately, Rushdoony and Hoggan became lightning rods for controversy. Rushdoony, a conservative Presbyterian minister, alienated many of the fund's secular and non-Protestant supporters and was fired by Bierly. Hoggan was even more controversial for his explicitly pro-Hitler and pro-Nazi sympathies. He was fired shortly after Rushdoony.

The Rushdoony/Hoggan controversy left Bierly and Couch scrambling to find support for the center even as Luhnow grew old and sick and was no longer able to support the organization. They courted Stanford University and the Hoover Institution with several million dollars in remaining Volker money only to be rebuffed. The center proved short lived and closed late in 1964 when Couch and Birely failed to secure the support of Stanford and Hoover. A decade later, the remainder of the Volker Fund money, amounting to about seven million dollars, went to the Hoover Institution.
