= Leonard Liggio =

American libertarian author (1933–2014)

Leonard P. Liggio (July 5, 1933 – October 14, 2014) was a classical liberal author, research professor of law at George Mason University and executive vice president of the Atlas Network in Fairfax, Virginia.

== Career ==
In 1965, Liggio gave lectures with Russell Stetler on "Imperialism and Anti-Imperialism: The Ideological Question in Vietnam" for the newly founded Free University of New York. He provided editorial direction for Literature of Liberty: A Review of Contemporary Liberal Thought, a periodical published by the Cato Institute from 1978 to 1979, then by the Institute for Humane Studies from 1980 to 1982.

Liggio was a visiting professor of law at the Francisco Marroquin University in Guatemala City, at the Academia Istropolitana in Bratislava (Slovakia), at the Institute for Political and Economic Studies (Georgetown University) and at the University of Aix-en-Provence, France. He was executive director of the John Templeton Foundation Freedom Project at the Atlas Network, where he led the International Freedom Project from 1998 to 2003. He was a distinguished senior scholar with the Institute for Humane Studies, where he served as director of Programs in History and Social Theory from 1974 to 1977, as executive vice-president from 1979 to 1980 and then as president from 1980 to 1989. Liggio served the Humane Studies Foundation as chairman from 1980 to 1994, and then as vice-chairman from 1994 to 1998.

== International activities ==
Liggio had an international influence. In 1958, he attended his first meeting of the Mont Pelerin Society in the United States, held at Princeton University. He became a member of the program committee for the society's 1994 meeting at Cannes in 1992. In 1996, he became its treasurer until 2000 as well as a member of its Program and Planning Committee for the 1998 Society meeting in Washington, D.C., and of its board of directors until 2006. He became the chairman of its program committee for the 2002 meeting in London, England. He was then vice-president of the Mont Pelerin Society from 2000 to 2002 and its president from 2002 to 2004. He has been senior vice-president since 2004 and due to leave in 2006.

Liggio was a trustee with the Competitive Enterprise Institute since 1994 and the Institute for Economic Studies-Europe in Aix-en-Provence since 1999. From 1988 to 1998, he had been a trustee of the Philadelphia Society, of which he was president from 1992 to 1993 and from 1994 to 1995. He had been also a trustee with the Institute for Humane Studies-Europe in Paris from 1989 to 1999 and of the Acton Institute for the Study of Religion and Liberty from 1990 to 1999. He also served on the boards of a number of other think tanks:

Member of the international advisory council, The Social Affairs Unit, Morley House, London, since 1994;
Member, board of trustees, Liberty Fund;
Member, advisory council, Acton Institute, Rome, Italy;
Member, advisory council, Institut Tocqueville, Paris, France;
Member, advisory council, Hayek Institute, Vienna, Austria;
Member, scientific council, Institut Turgot, Paris, France;
Member of the honorary board of trustees, Fundación Burke, Spain;
Member, editorial board, Centro Interdisciplinar de Ética e Economia Personalista, Brazil.

As part of the circle of anti-state libertarians led by Murray Rothbard during the 1950s, he played an important role in the development of modern libertarian philosophy in the United States. He was also a member of the Philadelphia Society.

== Editorial activities ==
Liggio was a member of the editorial board at the Cato Journal since 1981, of the American Journal of Jurisprudence at Notre Dame Law School since 1995 and of Markets & Morality since 2000.

He was the editor of Literature of Liberty: A Review of Contemporary Liberal Thought from 1978 to 1982.

In 1965, with Murray Rothbard and George Resch, Liggio created Left and Right: A Journal of Libertarian Thought, a publication which emphasized "common philosophical bonds uniting the anarchism and isolationism of the Old Right, and the instinctive pacifistic anarchism characterizing the New Left in the middle sixties".

== Death ==
Liggio died on October 14, 2014. He was a Catholic.

== Bibliography ==
=== Articles by Leonard Liggio ===
- "The Heritage of the Spanish Scholastics", Religion and Liberty, January–February 2000.
- "Christianity, Classical Liberalism are Liberty's Foundations", Religion and Liberty, September–October 1996.
- "Freedom and Virtue", review of Freedom and Virtue: The Conservative/Libertarian Debate by George W. Carey (Ed.), Religion and Liberty, September–October 1998.
- Hamowy, Ronald, ed. (2008). "Taft, Robert A. (1889–1953)". The Encyclopedia of Libertarianism. Thousand Oaks, CA: Sage; Cato Institute. p. 499. doi:10.4135/9781412965811. ISBN 978-1412965804. OCLC 750831024.

=== Articles about Leonard Liggio ===
- Atlas Network
- Radicals for Capitalism: A Freewheeling History of the Modern American Libertarian Movement, by Brian Doherty, describes Liggio's role in the modern libertarian movement
