= Left and Right: A Journal of Libertarian Thought =

Libertarian journal

- Left and Right: A Journal of Libertarian Thought (Complete, 1965–1968)
- Founder: Murray N. Rothbard, George Resch, and Leonard P. Liggio
- First issue: 1965
- Country: United States
- Language: English

Left and Right: A Journal of Libertarian Thought was a libertarian journal published between 1965 and 1968. Founded by Murray N. Rothbard, George Resch, and Leonard P. Liggio, it was edited and largely written by Rothbard.

== History ==
In the 1960s, Rothbard began questioning the alliance between libertarians and conservatives, especially given the vast difference of opinion on such issues as the Vietnam War. Rothbard concluded that libertarianism had its roots in the political left, and therefore that libertarians of the Old Right would be better suited in alliance with the growing anti-authoritarianism of the New Left.

As Rothbard put it in the opening editorial of the journal: "Our title, Left and Right, reflects our concerns in several ways. It reveals our editorial concern with the ideological; and it also highlights our conviction that the present-day categories of *left* and *right* have become misleading and obsolete, and that the doctrine of liberty contains elements corresponding with both contemporary left and right. This means in no sense that we are middle-of-the-roaders, eclectically trying to combine, or step between, both poles; but rather that a consistent view of liberty includes concepts that have also become part of the rhetoric or program of right and of left. Hence a creative approach to liberty must transcend the confines of contemporary political shibboleths."

Following that editorial in the first issue, Rothbard's essay "Left and Right: The Prospects for Liberty" was made available to readers. It explained in detail the origin of libertarian thought as an extension of radical, left-wing liberalism and the origin and nature of the unholy alliance of libertarianism with the conservative right.

== Book ==
In 2007, the Ludwig von Mises Institute collected together and published as a book all issues of the journal. The 690-page book was titled Left and Right: A Journal of Libertarian Thought (Complete, 1965–1968). ISSN 0024-0311. OCLC 162539399, 741754456

== See also ==
- Anarcho-capitalism
- Left libertarianism
- Libertarian Forum, The
