= America's Great Depression =

Book by Murray Rothbard

- First edition
- Author: Murray Rothbard
- Language: English
- Subject: Economic history
- Publisher: Van Nostrand
- Publication date: 1963
- Publication place: United States
- Media type: Print
- Pages: 361
- OCLC: 173706

America's Great Depression is a 1963 treatise by Austrian School economist Murray Rothbard on the causes of the 1930s Great Depression. Drawing from the Austrian theory of the business cycle, Rothbard argues that Federal Reserve inflationary policy in the 1920s and Herbert Hoover's interventionist response to the crash, rather than laissez-faire capitalism or private speculation, created and prolonged the depression.

== Summary ==
Rothbard argues that it was Herbert Hoover's interventionist response, not laissez-faire inaction, that deepened and prolonged the Great Depression. Drawing from the Austrian theory of the business cycle, he argues that government manipulation of money supply creates the "boom-bust" cycle in modern economies through malinvestment. Thus, he contends the Federal Reserve's inflationary policies from 1921 to 1929 primed the crash, making the depression the product of government and central-bank interference rather than of unrestrained private speculation.

He also criticizes the Keynesian concept of the "liquidity trap" where Rothbard states,

"The Keynesians are here misled by their superficial treatment of the interest rate as simply the price of loan contracts. The crucial interest rate, as we have indicated, is the natural rate — the "profit spread" on the market. Since loans are simply a form of investment, the rate on loans is but a pale reflection of the natural rate."

== Publishing history ==
- 1st Edition: Princeton, N.J.: D. Van Nostrand, 1963. Hardcover. 361 pages.
- 2nd Edition: Menlo Park, California: Institute for Humane Studies, 1972. 361 pages. ISBN 0-8402-5003-7.
- 3rd Edition: New York: New York University Press. Co-sponsored by Institute for Humane Studies. 1975. Paperback. 361 pages. ISBN 0-8362-0647-9. Hardcover ISBN 0-8362-0634-7.
- 4th Edition: New York: Richardson & Snyder/E.P. Dutton. 1983. Hardcover. 361 pages. ISBN 0-943940-03-6.
- 5th Edition: Auburn, Ala.: Ludwig von Mises Institute, June 15, 2000. Hardcover. 368 pages. ISBN 0-945466-05-6. (With an introduction by Paul Johnson)
