= The Ethics of Liberty =

1982 book by Murray Rothbard

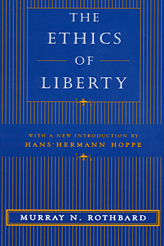
- Paperback cover
- Author: Murray N. Rothbard
- Language: English
- Subject: Liberty
- Published: 1982 (Humanities Press); 1998 (New York University Press)
- Publication place: United States
- Media type: Print (Hardcover & Paperback) & e-book, audio-CD
- Pages: 336 (Online e–book edition)
- ISBN: 0391023713 (Paperback edition)
- OCLC: 7813705
- Dewey Decimal: 323.44/01 19
- LC Class: JC585 .R69 1982

The Ethics of Liberty is a 1982 book by American philosopher and economist Murray N. Rothbard, in which the author expounds a libertarian political position. Rothbard's argument is based on a form of natural law ethics, and makes a case for anarcho-capitalism.

== Summary ==
The Ethics of Liberty is divided into five parts, although a previous edition lacked the fifth. Part I is an introduction, which explains the outlines of natural law theory in general and defends it briefly against some objections. Part II is the substance of the work itself, setting forth Rothbard's ethics regarding the use of force. Part III applies his ethical theories to the State, which he viewed as "the inherent enemy of liberty and, indeed, of genuine law". Part IV offers brief reviews of alternative political theories developed by Mises, Hayek, Berlin, and Nozick. Part V attempts to set forth a theory of strategy of how to move from the present system to a libertarian anarcho-capitalist society.

Hans-Hermann Hoppe's Introduction to the 1998 edition of the book says that it "explains the integration of economics and ethics via the joint concept of property; and based on the concept of property, and in conjunction with a few general empirical (biological and physical) observations or assumptions, Rothbard deduces the corpus of libertarian law, from the law of appropriation to that of contracts and punishment." Hoppe writes that The Ethics of Liberty was Rothbard's second magnum opus, the other being Man, Economy, and State (1962).

== Reception ==
Reception of the book has been positive in libertarian circles. Many praise the book for its incisive analysis of natural law and its practical applications. Libertarian commentator Sheldon Richman says: "The Ethics of Liberty is a great book that deserves the attention of anyone interested in the good society and human flourishing."

The philosopher Matt Zwolinski criticized the book, writing that "Rothbard's discussion of self-ownership in chapter six rests on a fundamental confusion between descriptive and normative claims."

The philosopher John Hospers wrote a critique containing his various thoughts and criticisms of the book immediately after its publication.

His ambiguous stance on the deceptions and frauds described in the book later gave rise to much debate.

One can also argue that whether the sale is a legal offense depends upon whether Ethan knew the truth and intentionally exaggerated the qualities of his product: did he intentionally lie, or did he make an honest mistake? Does it matter? Rothbard would probably say no. Consider again his remark: “Surely legality or illegality should depend not on the motivation of the actor, but on the objective nature of the act. If an action is objectively non-invasive, then it should be legal regardless of the benevolent or malicious intentions of the actor” (Rothbard 1982, p. 121).

— PAVEL SLUTSKIY(2016), FRAUDULENT ADVERTISING:, pp.112-113

== Release history ==
- Humanities Press. Atlantic Highlands, NJ: 1982. Hardcover. ISBN 0391023713.
- New York University Press. New York, 1998. Hardcover. ISBN 0814775063.
  - With a new introduction by Hans-Hermann Hoppe. Audiobook / full text available.
- New York University Press. New York, 2003. Paperback. ISBN 0814775594.
