= The Mystery of Banking =

Book by Murray Rothbard

- The first edition
- Author: Murray N. Rothbard
- Subject: Economics
- Genre: Non-fiction
- Publisher: Richardson & Snyder
- Publication date: 1983
- Publication place: United States
- Media type: Print
- Pages: 286 pp.
- ISBN: 0-943940-04-4
- OCLC: 10069727

The Mystery of Banking is Murray Rothbard's 1983 book explaining the modern fractional-reserve banking system and its origins. In his June 2008 preface to the 298-page second edition, Douglas E. French suggests the work also lays out the “...devastating effects [of fractional-reserve banking] on the lives of every man, woman, and child.”

Rothbard dedicated the book to Thomas Jefferson, Charles Holt Campbell, and Ludwig von Mises, all “Champions of Hard Money.”

== See also ==
- Austrian Business Cycle Theory
