= The Panic of 1819 (book) =

Book by Murray Rothbard

The Panic of 1819: Reactions and Policies
- Author: Murray Rothbard
- Language: English
- Subject: History
- Published: 1962
- Publisher: Columbia University Press
- Publication place: United States
- ISBN: 9780231939102
- OCLC: 468595119

The Panic of 1819: Reactions and Policies is a 1962 book by the economist Murray Rothbard, in which the author discusses what he calls the first great economic crisis of the United States. The book is based on his doctoral dissertation in economics at Columbia University during the mid-1950s.

== Summary ==
During the 19th century some observers believed that the panic originated within the economic system itself, since the event could not be readily attributed to any specific event, as had some previous crises. Rothbard, however, states that the Panic of 1819 arose from developments related to the War of 1812 and the postwar prosperity that followed. The outbreak of war stifled foreign trade and spurred the growth of domestic manufacturing, which grew to fill the demand previously met by imports. The government borrowed heavily to finance the war. Rothbard alleges that this led to a credit expansion which in turn led to rising prices. Rothbard's book provides a narrative of these events.

== Reception ==
The book had at least seven reviews which included both praise and criticism.

In a 1990 interview in The Austrian Economics Newsletter Rothbard was asked about the reception to the book and said it was well received, "In fact, much better than any other of my books. Maybe that's because I didn't analyze the causes. I only wrote about how people wanted to cure it."

== Publishing history ==
- New York: Columbia University Press, 1962.
- New York: AMS Press, 1973. ISBN 0-404-51605-X.
- Auburn, Alabama: Ludwig von Mises Institute, 2002. Web-based PDF file prepared by William Harshbarger.
- Auburn, Alabama: Ludwig von Mises Institute, 2007. ISBN 978-1-933550-08-4.
