= An Austrian Perspective on the History of Economic Thought =

Book by Murray N. Rothbard

An Austrian Perspective on the History of Economic Thought is two-volume non-fiction work written by Murray N. Rothbard. Rothbard said he originally intended to write a "standard Adam Smith-to-the-present moderately sized book"; but expanded the scope of the project to include economists who preceded Smith and to comprise a multi-volume series. Rothbard completed only the first two volumes, Economic Thought Before Adam Smith and Classical Economics.

== Release history ==
- An Austrian Perspective on the History of Economic Thought. Edward Elgar Publishing. 1995. ISBN 1-85278-962-X. OCLC 30156724
- An Austrian Perspective on the History of Economic Thought. Ludwig von Mises Institute. Auburn, Alabama. 2006. ISBN 0-945466-48-X (2 Volume Hardback totaling 1,084 pages). OCLC 64574138
