= Conceived in Liberty =

1975 book by Murray Rothbard

- Cover of volume one
- Author: Murray Rothbard
- Language: English
- Subject: History of the United States
- Publication date: 1975
- Publication place: United States
- Media type: Print

Conceived in Liberty is a five-volume narrative by Murray Rothbard on the history of the United States from the pre-colonial period through the American Revolution. It takes its name from a phrase used in the Gettysburg Address.

== Summary ==
In this work of nearly 1700 pages, Rothbard states that the history of the United States has been motivated by people's pursuit of liberty, which he believes is constantly being threatened by political power. Rothbard contrasts his views with what he claims are thinkers on the right who see the American Revolution as a "conservative" event, and other thinkers on the left who view it as some sort of proto-socialist uprising. Instead, Rothbard states that he views this period as a time of libertarian radicalism.

Rothbard stated that American Revolutionaries fell into two camps: The first camp was those who wanted to demolish the British Empire's state apparatus in the colonies. The other camp wanted to keep the empire, but have Americans run it. (The state apparatus could be defined as the centralized institution of the crown such as the army, taxation, church establishment, commercial regulations and trade barriers, control of land development, banking, government debt, etc.) The first camp, Rothbard opined was the more libertarian, anti-federalist camp associated with Jefferson and Jackson. The second camp was the more federalist centralizing camp, associated with Hamilton and later the Whigs. They felt that in the right hands, the power of the centralized state could serve the public interest, an interest which neatly coincided with their interests. The conflict between these two factions is another part of understanding the revolution, its outcome, and its conservative and radical aspects.

== Creation ==
Rothbard said in a 1990 interview: "After the Volker Fund collapsed, I got a grant from the Lilly Endowment to do a history of the U.S., which I worked on from 1962–66. The original idea was to take the regular facts and put a libertarian assessment on everything. But once I started to work on it, I found many facts that had been left out, like tax rebellions. So it got longer and longer. It turned into the five-volume Conceived in Liberty, covering the Colonial period to the Constitution. I don't like to completely chart out my research in advance. I go step by step and it always seems to get longer than anticipated. After Arlington House published volume four, they went out of business. Volume five, on the Constitution, was written in longhand and no one can read my handwriting."

According to Lew Rockwell, "indeed, Murray wrote the fifth volume, the most revisionist of all. He did it in longhand on legal yellow pads, and used a dictating machine a friend had given him. His wife Joey would use the recording to type the manuscript." Rockwell says of it that "The fifth volume completes Murray’s great work, lost for decades, yet as relevant as the day he finished it."

== "Lost" fifth volume ==
In the summer of 2013 Patrick Newman initially realized this was probably a complete work rather than disjointed notes as Mises Fellow. The tapes had been lost but the first sixty pages typed from them were available as were the scrawling, note and marginalia-filled, pages of longhand. Academic Vice-President of the Mises Institute Joseph Salerno approached him to possibly translate Rothbard's longhand notes and edit the fifth volume. After a week of attempting to read the longhand and using the helpful amounts of references included in the notes to interpret Rothbard's handwriting word-by-word, Patrick was able to start deciphering the text. He said it was "like learning a new language" and of the six weeks in June–July 2018 he was mostly doing this he said "I was going to sleep and I was seeing his words in my mind."

== First four volumes ==
- Volume One covers the discovery of the Americas and the colonies in the 17th century (531 pages, including index).
  - Audiobook of Volume One
- Volume Two covers the period of "salutary neglect" in the first half of the 18th century (294 pages, including index).
  - Audiobook of Volume Two
- Volume Three covers the advance to revolution, from 1760–1775 (373 pages, including index).
  - Audiobook of Volume Three
- Volume Four covers the political, military, and ideological history of the revolution and after (470 pages, including index).
  - Audiobook of Volume Four
  - Full text of Volumes One to Four in pdf and other formats
- Volume Five covers America after the immediate impacts of the rebellion from 1784–1791, including the Constitutional Convention to the ratification of the Bill of Rights. (Includes separate index)
  - Full text of Volume Five in pdf and other formats

== Excerpts ==
- Volume I, Chapter 55, Pennsylvania's Anarchist Experiment: 1681–1690, Full text (slightly edited)
- Volume II, Chapter 33, The Growth of Libertarian Thought in Colonial America. Full text
- Volume II, Chapter 40, The American Colonies and the War. Online text (slightly edited)

== Publishing history ==
- New Rochelle, NY: Arlington House Publishers:
  - Volume I. 1975. ISBN 0-87000-262-7.
  - Volume II. 1975. ISBN 0-87000-316-X.
  - Volume III. 1976. ISBN 0-87000-343-7.
  - Volume IV. 1979. ISBN 0-87000-352-6.
- Liberty Tree Press, 1989. Paperback. ISBN 0-945999-23-2.
- Auburn, Alabama: Ludwig von Mises Institute, 2019. Paperback. 332 pages. ISBN 978-1-61016-708-6.
  - Volume V
- Auburn, Alabama: Ludwig von Mises Institute, 2000. Hardcover. 1668 pages. ISBN 0-945466-26-9.
  - Volumes I–V
