= Title-transfer theory of contract =

Legal interpretation

The title-transfer theory of contract (TTToC) is a legal interpretation of contracts developed by economist Murray Rothbard and jurist Williamson Evers. The theory interprets all contractual obligations in terms of property rights, viewing a contract as a bundle of title transfers. According to Randy Barnett, the TTToC stands in opposition to most mainstream contract theories which view contractual obligations as the result of a binding promise. Proponents of the approach often claim it is superior on grounds of both consistency and ethical considerations. The TTToC is often supported by libertarians.

== Fraud ==
Under the TTToC breach of contract is only what can be interpreted as an act of theft. For example, if a specified condition for a conditional title transfer from party A to party B is not met, yet party B still captures possession of the property they are not entitled to, they have committed theft, whether the possession was taken by force, or by false representation of fact creating the impression the transfer conditions has been met.

If a service provider has failed to perform an act of service, he has not committed theft. In such cases provisions should be made in advance for the non-breaching party to be entitled to compensation, in the condition of a failure to provide the agreed upon service.

== Implications ==
Since the TTToC is based on property rights, it is compatible with the non-aggression principle. According to the proponents of the theory, the TTToC ensures ownership of every owned good is well defined at any point in time. Contracts regarding unalienable property titles are not binding. Some argue that since ownership of one's body is unalienable, voluntary slavery contracts are not binding under the TTToC. Promises that are not made with the intention of being legally binding are also non-enforceable under the TTToC.

== Criticism ==
In their 2022 paper, Contract Theory, Title Transfer, and Libertarianism, Dominiak and Fegley offer a critique of the Title Transfer Theory of contracts (TTT), libertarian theorists. They claim in the paper that TTT cannot consistently explain contract enforceability even on its own.

== See also ==
- Freedom of contract
- Bundle of rights
- Pacta sunt servanda
