= The Betrayal of the American Right =

2007 book by Murray Rothbard

- Author: Murray Rothbard
- Language: English
- Publisher: Ludwig von Mises Institute
- Publication date: 2007
- Publication place: United States
- Media type: Print
- Pages: 231
- ISBN: 978-1933550138
- OCLC: 717325638

The Betrayal of the American Right is a book by Murray Rothbard written in the early 1970s and published by the Ludwig von Mises Institute in 2007.

In it, Rothbard describes the development of the American political Old Right between the 1920s and 1950s, claiming that it died out in favor of a more interventionist political Right during the Cold War. It also describes Rothbard's own intellectual development during the period.

== Summary ==
Rothbard describes the transformation of the American right wing over the past two decades, from an opposition movement to an establishment-supporting one. As defined in Chapter 1, "Two Rights, Old and New", the Old Right, which existed from the mid-1920s to the mid-1950s, was a libertarian, anti-establishment movement that opposed the New Deal and American global intervention abroad; the New Right, which emerged in the 1960s, embraced the establishment and its power, becoming more statist and traditional conservative in its political philosophy. Rothbard emphasizes the irony of the fact that the term "Establishment," now used as a term of opprobrium by the Left, was first applied to America by Frank S. Meyer in the National Review, a right-wing publication, as a term of bitter criticism of the establishment by the Old Right.
