= Egalitarianism as a Revolt Against Nature and Other Essays =

Book by Murray Rothbard

- The first edition
- Author: Murray Rothbard
- Language: English
- Subject: Political philosophy
- Published: 1974
- Publication place: United States
- Media type: Print
- Pages: 352

Egalitarianism as a Revolt Against Nature and Other Essays is a 1974 book by economist Murray Rothbard.

The book's title comes from the lead essay, which argues that egalitarian theory always results in a politics of statist control because it is founded on revolt against the ontological structure of reality itself. According to Rothbard in this lead essay, statist intellectuals attempt to replace what exists with a Romantic image of an idealized primitive state of nature, an ideal which cannot and should not be achieved, according to Rothbard. The implications of this point are worked out on topics such as market economics, child rights, environmentalism, feminism, foreign policy, redistribution and others.

== Publishing history ==
- Washington, D.C.: Libertarian Review Press. June 1974.
- Auburn, Alabama: Ludwig von Mises Institute. 2000. Paperback. ISBN 0-945466-23-4.
