= Man, Economy, and State =

1962 book by Murray Rothbard

Man, Economy, and State with Power and Market
- First edition (volume I)
- Author: Murray Rothbard
- Original title: Man, Economy, and State: A treatise on economic principles volume I (Note: The original publisher deleted the final eight chapters from the original publication, so the 1962 book is effectively an abridged edition, although published instead as "Volume I". In 1970, the abridged chapters were published as the title Power and Market. The 2009 and later editions restore the chapters to a single volume, combining the discussion of both microeconomics and macroeconomics.)
- Language: English
- Subject: Economics
- Publisher: D. van Nostrand (1962), Institute for Humane Studies (1981), Ludwig von Mises Institute (1993, 2004)
- Publication date: 1962 (abridged); 1981, 1993, 2004 (full text)
- Publication place: United States
- Media type: print
- Pages: 987 (abridged); 1,506 (full text)
- ISBN: 0814753809
- OCLC: 339220
- See also Rothbard (1970) Power and Market.

Man, Economy, and State: A treatise on economic principles is a 1962 book of Austrian School economics by Murray Rothbard (orig. abridged ed.). It was originally intended as a textbook form of Human Action by Ludwig von Mises, but became its own treatise after he realized original work was needed to flesh out Mises' ideas.

According to Salerno, the book Power and Market: Government and the Economy "was originally written as the third volume of Man, Economy, and State, but was published separately eight years later". It was reunited with the 4th edition of Man, Economy, and State in 2004 in the volume sub-titled "The Scholar's Edition" from the Ludwig von Mises Institute. The author analyzes the negative effects of the various kinds of government intervention, and argues that the State is neither necessary nor useful.
