= Murray Rothbard =

American economist (1926–1995)

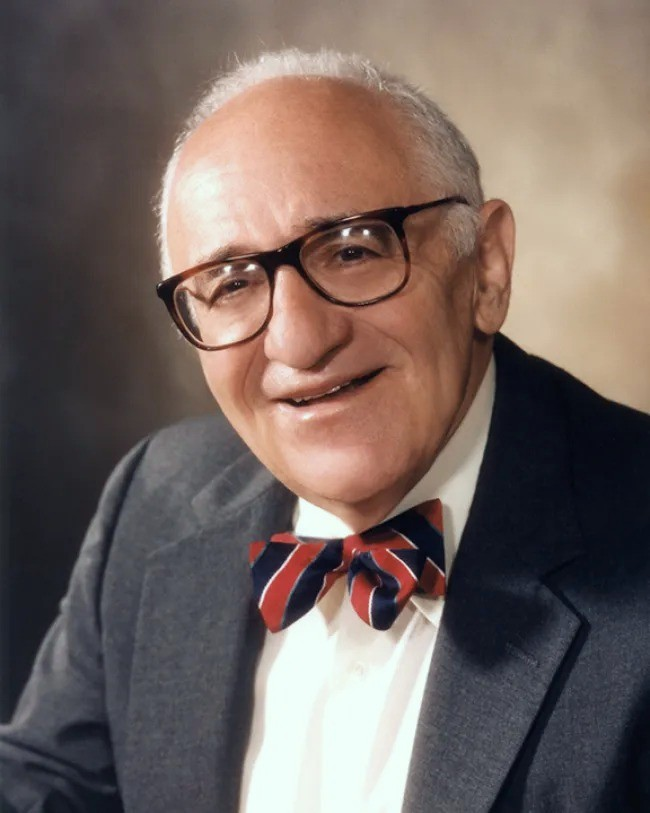
- Rothbard in the 1990s
- Born: Murray Newton Rothbard; March 2, 1926; New York City, U.S.
- Died: January 7, 1995 (aged 68); New York City, U.S.
- Resting place: Oakwood Cemetery, Unionville, Virginia, U.S.
- Organization(s): Center for Libertarian Studies; Cato Institute; Mises Institute
- Political party: Republican (before 1952); Peace and Freedom (1968–1974); Libertarian (1974–1989)
- Movement: American libertarianism

Academic background
- Education: Columbia University (BA, MA, PhD)
- Influences: Aristotle; Aquinas; Bastiat; Böhm-Bawerk; Cajetan; Cantillon; Chodorov; Condillac; Francis; Garrett; Grotius; Hazlitt; Locke; Mencken; Menger; Mises; Nock; Oppenheimer; Paterson; Spencer; Spooner; Thoreau; Tucker; Turgot; Vitoria

Academic work
- Discipline: Economic history Ethics; History of economic thought Legal philosophy Political philosophy Praxeology
- School or tradition: Austrian School
- Institutions: Brooklyn Polytechnic Institute; University of Nevada, Las Vegas
- Notable students: Walter Block; Hans-Hermann Hoppe; Samuel Edward Konkin III
- Notable ideas: Anarcho-capitalism; Historical revisionism Left-libertarianism; Paleolibertarianism; Right-libertarianism; Title-transfer theory of contract

Murray Newton Rothbard (US: /ˈrɔːθbɑːrd/; March 2, 1926 – January 7, 1995) was an American economist of the Austrian School, economic historian, political theorist, and activist. Rothbard was a central figure in the 20th-century American libertarian movement, particularly its right-wing strands, and was a founder and leading theoretician of anarcho-capitalism. He wrote over twenty books on political theory, history, economics, and other subjects.

Rothbard argued that all services provided by the "monopoly system of the corporate state" could be provided more efficiently by the private sector and wrote that the state is "the organization of robbery systematized and writ large". He called fractional-reserve banking a form of fraud and opposed central banking. He categorically opposed all military, political, and economic interventionism in the affairs of other nations.

Rothbard rejected mainstream economic methodologies and instead embraced the praxeology of Ludwig von Mises. Along with his writing and libertarian activism, he taught economics part-time at the Brooklyn Polytechnic Institute starting in 1966, and after 1986 in an endowed position at the University of Nevada, Las Vegas. Partnering with the oil billionaire Charles Koch, Rothbard was a founder of the Cato Institute and the Center for Libertarian Studies in the 1970s. He broke with Cato and Koch, and in 1982 joined Lew Rockwell and Burton Blumert to establish the Mises Institute in Alabama.

While he was a right-libertarian, Rothbard was a critic of Milton Friedman, Ayn Rand, and Adam Smith. Rothbard opposed egalitarianism and the civil rights movement, and blamed women's voting and activism for the growth of the welfare state. He promoted historical revisionism and befriended the Holocaust denier Harry Elmer Barnes. Later in his career, Rothbard advocated a libertarian alliance with paleoconservatism (which he called paleolibertarianism), favoring right-wing populism and describing David Duke and Joseph McCarthy as models for political strategy. In the 2010s, he received renewed attention as an influence on the alt-right.

== Life and work ==
=== Education ===
Rothbard's parents were David and Rae Rothbard, Jewish immigrants to the United States from Poland and Russia, respectively. David was a chemist. Rothbard attended Birch Wathen Lenox School, a private school in New York City. Rothbard later said he much preferred Birch Wathen to the "debasing and egalitarian public school system" he had attended in the Bronx.

Rothbard wrote of having grown up as an adherent of the "Old Right" among friends and neighbors who were "communists or fellow-travelers". He was a member of the New York Young Republican Club in his youth. Rothbard described his father as an individualist who embraced minimal government, free enterprise, private property and "a determination to rise by one's own merits ... [A]ll socialism seemed to me monstrously coercive and abhorrent." In 1952, his father was trapped during a labor strike at the Tide Water Oil Refinery in New Jersey which he managed, confirming their dislike of organized labor.

Rothbard attended Columbia University, receiving a Bachelor of Arts degree in mathematics in 1945 and a PhD in economics in 1956. The delay in receiving his PhD was due in part to conflict with his advisor, Joseph Dorfman, and in part to Arthur Burns's rejecting his dissertation. Burns was a longtime friend of the Rothbard family and their neighbor at their Manhattan apartment building. It was only after Burns went on leave from the Columbia faculty to head President Eisenhower's Council of Economic Advisers that Rothbard's thesis was accepted, and he received his doctorate.

His first political activism came during the 1948 presidential election, where Rothbard, "as a Jewish student at Columbia, horrified his peers by organizing a Students for Strom Thurmond chapter, so staunchly did he believe in states' rights". Rothbard later said of his time at Columbia that all his fellow students were extreme leftists and that he was one of the university's only two Republicans at the time.

=== Marriage, Volker Fund, and academia ===
During the 1940s, Rothbard vetted articles for Leonard Read at the Foundation for Economic Education think tank, became acquainted with Frank Chodorov, and read widely in libertarian-oriented works by Albert Jay Nock, Garet Garrett, Isabel Paterson, H. L. Mencken, and Austrian School economist Ludwig von Mises. Rothbard was greatly influenced by reading Mises's book Human Action in 1949. In the 1950s, when Mises was teaching in the Wall Street division of the New York University Stern School of Business, Rothbard attended his unofficial seminar. Rothbard wanted to promote libertarian activism; by the mid-1950s, he helped form the Circle Bastiat, a libertarian and anarchist social group in New York City. He also joined the Mont Pelerin Society in the 1950s.

Rothbard attracted the attention of the William Volker Fund, a group that provided financial backing to promote right-wing ideologies in the 1950s and early 1960s. The Volker Fund paid Rothbard to write a textbook to explain Human Action in a form that could be used to introduce college undergraduates to Mises's views; a sample chapter he wrote on money and credit won Mises's approval. For ten years, the Volker Fund paid him a retainer as a "senior analyst". As Rothbard continued his work, he enlarged the project. The result was his book Man, Economy, and State, published in 1962. Upon its publication, Mises praised Rothbard's work effusively. In contrast to Mises, who considered security the primary justification for the state, Rothbard in the 1950s began to argue for a privatized market for the military, police and judiciary. Rothbard's 1963 book America's Great Depression blamed government policy failures for the Great Depression, and challenged the widely held view that capitalism is unstable.

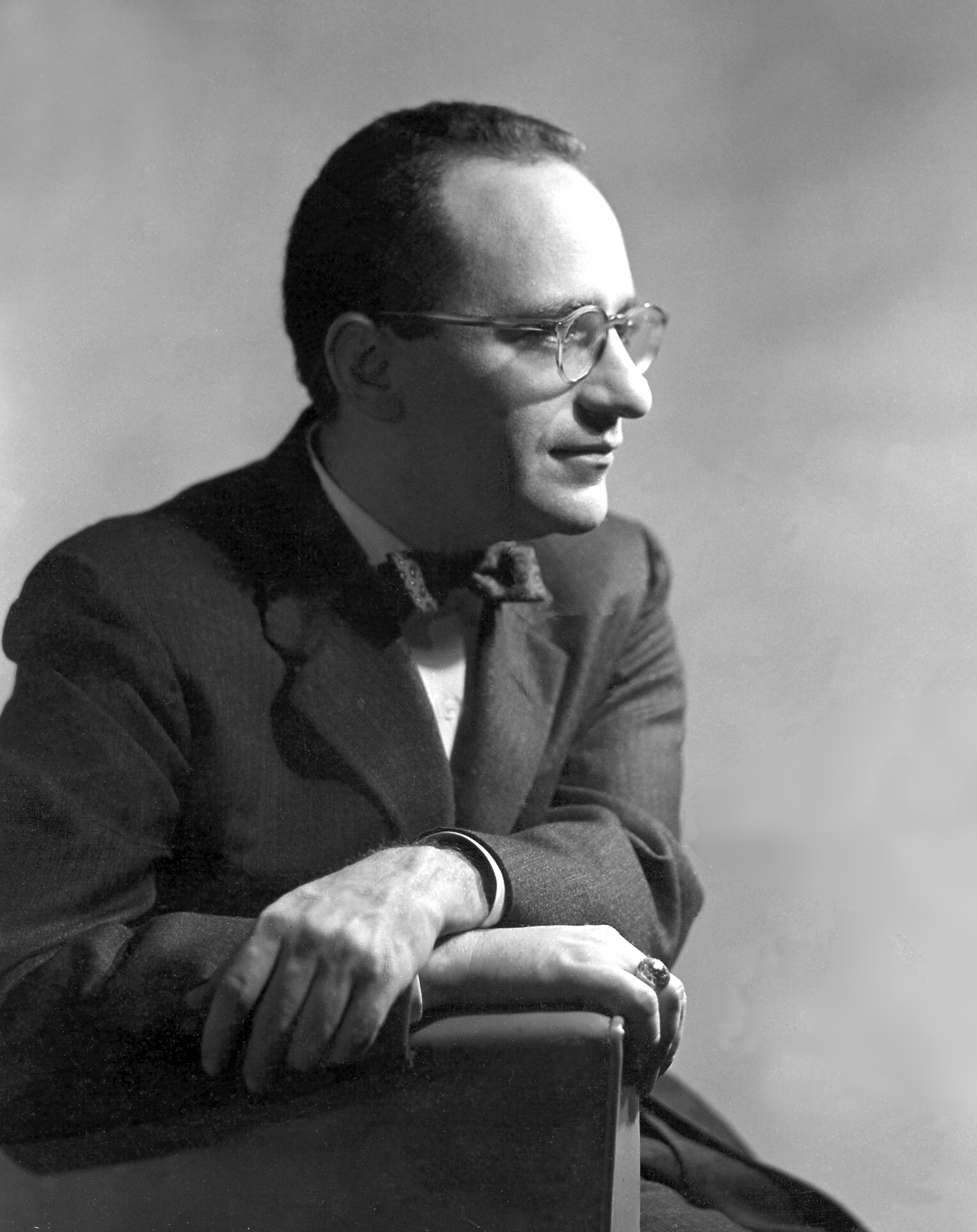
Rothbard in the mid-1950s

In 1953, Rothbard married JoAnn Beatrice Schumacher (1928–1999), whom he called Joey, in New York City. She was a historian, Rothbard's personal editor, and a close adviser as well as hostess of his Rothbard Salon. They enjoyed a loving marriage, and Rothbard often called her "the indispensable framework" of his life and achievements. According to her, the Volker Fund's patronage allowed Rothbard to work from home as a freelance theorist and pundit for the first 15 years of their marriage.

The Volker Fund collapsed in 1962, leading Rothbard to seek employment at various New York academic institutions. He was offered a part-time position teaching economics to engineering students at Brooklyn Polytechnic Institute in 1966 at age 40. The institution had no economics department or economics majors, and Rothbard derided its social science department as "Marxist". Justin Raimondo, his biographer, writes that Rothbard liked teaching at Brooklyn Polytechnic because working only two days a week gave him the freedom to contribute to developments in libertarian politics. Rothbard continued in this role until 1986. Then 60 years old, Rothbard left Brooklyn Polytechnic Institute for the Lee Business School at the University of Nevada, Las Vegas (UNLV), where he held the title of S.J. Hall Distinguished Professor of Economics, a chair endowed by a libertarian businessman.

According to Rothbard's friend, colleague, and fellow Misesian economist Hans-Hermann Hoppe, Rothbard led a "fringe existence" in academia, but he was able to attract a large number of "students and disciples" through his writings, thereby becoming "the creator and one of the principal agents of the contemporary libertarian movement". Libertarian economist Jeffrey Herbener, who called Rothbard his friend and "intellectual mentor", said in a memoriam that Rothbard received "only ostracism" from mainstream academia. Rothbard kept his position at UNLV from 1986 until his death.

=== Old Right ===
Throughout his life, Rothbard engaged in a number of different political movements to promote Old Right and libertarian principles. George Hawley writes that "unfortunately for Rothbard, the Old Right was ending as an intellectual and political force just as he was maturing as an intellectual", with the militantly anticommunist conservative movement exemplified by William F. Buckley Jr. supplanting the Old Right's isolationism.

Rothbard was an admirer of Senator Joseph McCarthy—not for McCarthy's Cold War views, but for his demagoguery, which Rothbard credited for disrupting the establishment consensus of what Rothbard called "corporate liberalism". Rothbard contributed many articles to Buckley's National Review, but his relations with Buckley and the magazine soured as he criticized the conservative movement for militarism. Specifically, Rothbard opposed how such militarism could justify and expand the state's power.

Rothbard befriended the Holocaust denier Harry Elmer Barnes in 1959. In a 1966 issue of Robert LeFevre's Rampart Journal of Individualist Thought devoted to historical revisionism, Rothbard argued that Western democracies had been to blame for starting World War I, World War II, and the Cold War. Rothbard published works by Barnes in his journals before and after Barnes died in 1968, including posthumously in the Cato Institute's journal.

=== Conflict with Ayn Rand ===
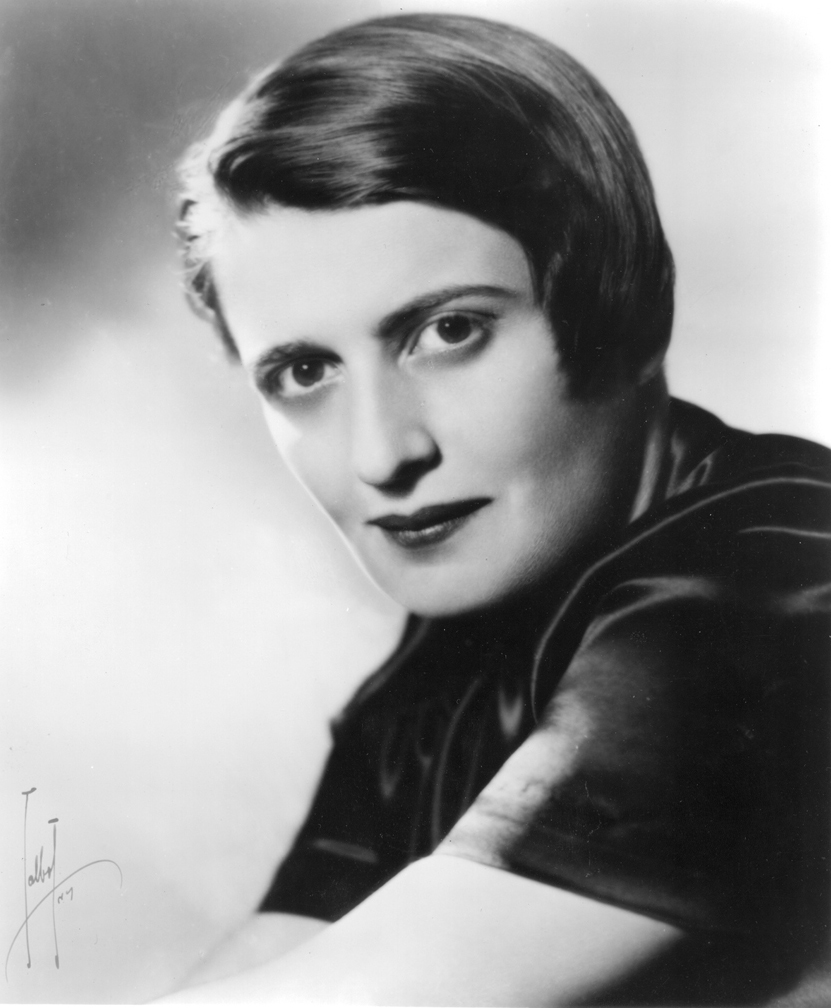
Ayn Rand, the founder of Objectivism

In 1954, Rothbard, along with several other attendees of Mises's seminar, joined the circle of novelist Ayn Rand, the founder of Objectivism. He soon parted from her, writing, among other things, that her ideas were not as original as she proclaimed but similar to those of Aristotle, Thomas Aquinas, and Herbert Spencer. In 1958, after the publication of Rand's novel Atlas Shrugged, Rothbard wrote her a "fan letter", calling the book "an infinite treasure house" and "not merely the greatest novel ever written, [but] one of the very greatest books ever written, fiction or nonfiction." He also wrote: "[Y]ou introduced me to the whole field of natural rights and natural law philosophy," prompting him to learn "the glorious natural rights tradition." Rothbard rejoined Rand's circle for a few months but soon broke with Rand again over various differences, including his defense of his interpretation of anarchism.

Rothbard later satirized Rand's acolytes in his unpublished one-act farce Mozart Was a Red and his essay "The Sociology of the Ayn Rand Cult". He characterized Rand's circle as a "dogmatic, personality cult". His play parodies Rand (through the character Carson Sand) and her friends and is set during a visit from Keith Hackley, a fan of Sand's novel The Brow of Zeus (a play on Atlas Shrugged).

=== New Left outreach ===
By the late 1960s, according to The American Conservative, Rothbard's "long and winding yet somehow consistent road had taken him from anti-New Deal and anti-interventionist Robert A. Taft supporter into friendship with the quasi-pacifist Nebraska Republican Congressman Howard Buffett (father of Warren Buffett) then over to the League of (Adlai) Stevensonian Democrats and, by 1968, into tentative comradeship with the anarchist factions of the New Left." Rothbard joined the Peace and Freedom Party and contributed writing to the New Left journal Ramparts.

Rothbard later criticized the New Left for supporting a "People's Republic"-style Egalitarianism as a Revolt Against Nature and Other Essays . It was during this phase that he associated with Karl Hess (a former Barry Goldwater speechwriter who had rejected conservatism) and founded Left and Right: A Journal of Libertarian Thought with Leonard Liggio and George Resch. Raimondo described Rothbard during this time as "a man of the Old Culture: he believed that it was possible to be a revolutionary, an anarchist, and lead a bourgeois life", and wrote that the "respectably dressed, if a bit rumpled" Rothbard was "immune to the blandishments of sixties youth culture". During this time, Rothbard proposed that black Americans should embrace racial separatism and secession. He was frustrated that blacks and whites in the New Left instead decided to work together for egalitarian goals. In the 1970s, Rothbard turned sharply against the left and described state-enforced equality as evil.

=== Libertarianism and Cato Institute ===
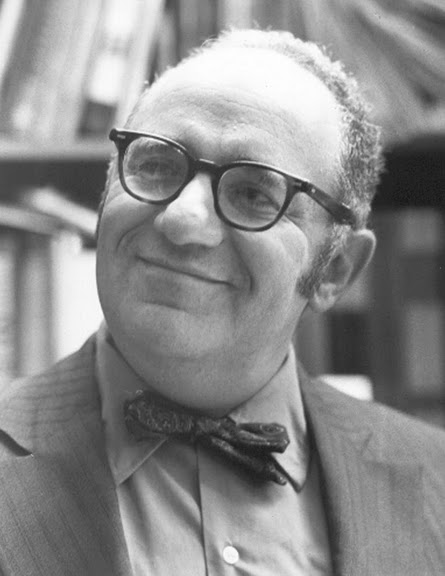
Rothbard in the 1970s

From 1969 to 1984, Rothbard edited The Libertarian Forum, also initially with Hess (although Hess's involvement ended in 1971). Despite its small readership, it engaged conservatives associated with the National Review in nationwide debate. Rothbard rejected the view that Ronald Reagan's 1980 presidential election was a victory for libertarian principles, and he attacked Reagan's economic program in a series of Libertarian Forum articles. In 1982, Rothbard called Reagan's claims of spending cuts a "fraud" and a "hoax" and accused Reaganites of doctoring the economic statistics to give a false impression that their policies successfully reduced inflation and unemployment. He further criticized the "myths of Reaganomics" in 1987.

Rothbard criticized the "frenzied nihilism" of left-wing libertarians but also criticized right-wing libertarians who were content to rely only on education to bring down the state; he believed that libertarians should adopt any moral tactic available to them to bring about liberty. Imbibing Randolph Bourne's idea that "war is the health of the state", Rothbard opposed all wars in his lifetime and engaged in anti-war activism.

During the 1970s and 1980s, Rothbard was active in the Libertarian Party. He was frequently involved in the party's internal politics. Rothbard founded the Center for Libertarian Studies in 1976 and the Journal of Libertarian Studies in 1977. He was one of the founders of the Cato Institute in 1977 (whose funding by Charles Koch was a major infusion of money for libertarianism) and "came up with the idea of naming this libertarian think tank after Cato's Letters, a powerful series of British newspaper essays by John Trenchard and Thomas Gordon which played a decisive influence upon America's Founding Fathers in fomenting the Revolution".

From 1978 to 1983, Rothbard was associated with the Libertarian Party Radical Caucus, allying himself with Justin Raimondo, Eric Garris and Williamson Evers. He opposed the "low-tax liberalism" espoused by 1980 Libertarian Party presidential candidate Ed Clark and Cato Institute president Edward H Crane III. According to Charles Burris, "Rothbard and Crane became bitter rivals after disputes emerging from the 1980 LP presidential campaign of Ed Clark carried over to strategic direction and management of Cato".

Janek Wasserman wrote, "The tempestuous tale of the Rothbard-Koch-Cato relationship has been told and retold because of its floridness." Rothbard sought to cultivate radical anarcho-capitalists, while Crane and Koch wanted a more reformist approach to influence government and gain political power. Rothbard was removed from Cato's board in 1981. Wasserman described the split as "the first of many examples of Austrian and libertarian schisms in the United States".

=== Mises Institute ===
In 1982, following his split with the Cato Institute, Rothbard co-founded the Ludwig von Mises Institute in Auburn, Alabama, (with Lew Rockwell and Burton Blumert) and was vice president of academic affairs until 1995. Rothbard also founded the institute's Review of Austrian Economics, a heterodox economics journal later renamed the Quarterly Journal of Austrian Economics, in 1987. Rothbard "worked closely with Lew Rockwell (joined later by his long-time friend Blumert) in nurturing the Mises Institute and the publication, The Rothbard-Rockwell Report; which after Rothbard's 1995 death evolved into the website, LewRockwell.com", according to the website.

Rothbard and other Mises Institute scholars criticized libertarian groups funded by the Koch brothers, referring to them as the "Kochtopus". In contrast to some other libertarian groups, the Mises Institute "pushed more politically marginal positions like the virtues of secession, the need for a return to the gold standard, and opposition to racial integration", according to historian Quinn Slobodian. Rothbard split with the Radical Caucus at the 1983 national convention over cultural issues and aligned himself with what he called the "right-wing populist" wing of the party, notably Lew Rockwell and Ron Paul, who ran for president on the Libertarian Party ticket in 1988.

=== Paleolibertarianism ===
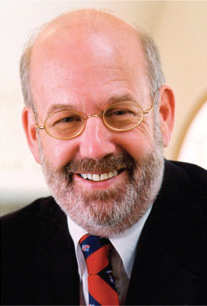
Lew Rockwell

In 1989, Rothbard left the Libertarian Party and began building bridges to the post-Cold War anti-interventionist right, calling himself a paleolibertarian, a conservative reaction against the cultural liberalism of mainstream libertarianism. Paleolibertarianism sought to appeal to disaffected working-class whites through a synthesis of cultural conservatism and libertarian economics. According to Reason, Rothbard advocated right-wing populism in part because he was frustrated that mainstream thinkers were not adopting the libertarian view and suggested that former Ku Klux Klan Grand Wizard David Duke, as well as Wisconsin Senator Joseph McCarthy, were models for an "Outreach to the Rednecks" effort that a broad libertarian/paleoconservative coalition could use. Working together, the coalition would expose the "unholy alliance of 'corporate liberal' Big Business and media elites, who, through big government, have privileged and caused to rise up a parasitic Underclass". Rothbard blamed this "underclass" for "looting and oppressing the bulk of the middle and working classes in America". Regarding Duke's political program, Rothbard asserted that there was "nothing" in it that "could not also be embraced by paleoconservatives or paleolibertarians; lower taxes, dismantling the bureaucracy, slashing the welfare system, attacking affirmative action and racial set-asides, calling for equal rights for all Americans, including whites". He also praised the "racialist science" in Charles Murray's controversial book The Bell Curve.

Rothbard co-founded and became a key figure in the John Randolph Club, which was an alliance between the Mises Institute and the paleoconservative Rockford Institute. He supported the presidential campaign of Pat Buchanan in 1992, writing that "with Pat Buchanan as our leader, we shall break the clock of social democracy". When Buchanan dropped out of the Republican primary race, Rothbard then shifted his interest and support to Ross Perot, who Rothbard wrote had "brought an excitement, a verve, a sense of dynamics and of open possibilities to what had threatened to be a dreary race". Rothbard eventually withdrew his support from Perot, and endorsed George H. W. Bush in the 1992 election. Like Buchanan, Rothbard opposed the North American Free Trade Agreement (NAFTA); however, he had become disillusioned with Buchanan by 1995, believing that the latter's "commitment to protectionism was mutating into an all-round faith in economic planning and the nation state".

=== Personal life ===
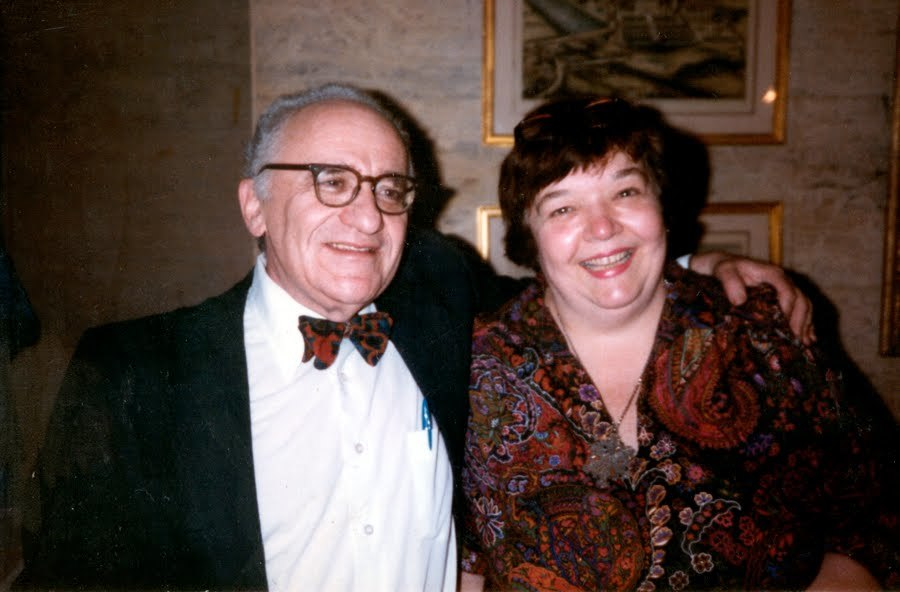
Rothbard with his wife Joey

Joey Rothbard said in a memoriam that her husband had a happy and bright spirit and that Rothbard, a night owl, "managed to make a living for 40 years without having to get up before noon. This was important to him." She said Rothbard would begin every day with a phone conversation with his colleague Lew Rockwell: "Gales of laughter would shake the house or apartment, as they checked in with each other. Murray thought it was the best possible way to start a day".

Rothbard was irreligious and agnostic about God, describing himself as a "mixture of an agnostic and a Reform Jew". Despite identifying as an agnostic and an atheist, he was critical of the "left-libertarian hostility to religion". In Rothbard's later years, many of his friends anticipated that he would convert to Catholicism, but he never did.

=== Death ===
Rothbard died of a heart attack on January 7, 1995, in St. Luke's-Roosevelt Hospital Center in Manhattan, at the age of 68. The New York Times obituary called Rothbard "an economist and social philosopher who fiercely defended individual freedom against government intervention". Lew Rockwell, president of the Mises Institute, told The New York Times that Rothbard was "the founder of right-wing anarchism". William F. Buckley Jr. wrote a critical obituary in the National Review, criticizing Rothbard's "defective judgment" and views on the Cold War. Hoppe, Rockwell, and Rothbard's other colleagues at the Mises Institute took a different view, arguing that he was one of the most important philosophers in history.

== Views ==
=== Austrian economics ===
Rothbard was an advocate and practitioner of the Austrian School tradition of his teacher Ludwig von Mises. Like Mises, Rothbard rejected the application of the scientific method to economics and dismissed econometrics, empirical and statistical analysis, and other tools of mainstream social science as outside the field (economic history might use those tools, but not Economics proper). He instead embraced praxeology, the strictly a priori methodology of Mises. Praxeology conceives of economic laws as akin to geometric or mathematical axioms: fixed, unchanging, objective, and discernible through logical reasoning.

According to Misesian economist Hans-Hermann Hoppe, eschewing the scientific method and empiricism distinguishes the Misesian approach "from all other current economic schools", which dismiss the Misesian approach as "dogmatic and unscientific." Mark Skousen of Chapman University and the Foundation for Economic Education, a critic of mainstream economics, praises Rothbard as brilliant, his writing style persuasive, his economic arguments nuanced and logically rigorous and his Misesian methodology sound. But Skousen concedes that Rothbard was effectively "outside the discipline" of mainstream economics and that his work "fell on deaf ears" outside his ideological circles. Rothbard wrote extensively on Austrian business cycle theory and, as part of this approach, strongly opposed central banking, fiat money, and fractional-reserve banking, advocating a gold standard and a 100% reserve requirement for banks.

==== Polemics against mainstream economics ====
Rothbard wrote a series of polemics in which he deprecated a number of leading modern economists. He vilified Adam Smith, calling him a "shameless plagiarist" who set economics off track, ultimately leading to the rise of Marxism. Rothbard praised Smith's contemporaries, including Richard Cantillon, Anne Robert Jacques Turgot and Étienne Bonnot de Condillac, for developing the subjective theory of value. In response to Rothbard's charge that Smith's The Wealth of Nations was largely plagiarized, David D. Friedman castigated Rothbard's scholarship and character, saying that he "was [either] deliberately dishonest or never really read the book he was criticizing". Tony Endres called Rothbard's treatment of Smith a "travesty".

Rothbard was equally scathing in his criticism of John Maynard Keynes, calling him weak on economic theory and a shallow political opportunist. Rothbard also wrote more generally that Keynesian-style governmental regulation of money and credit created a "dismal monetary and banking situation". He called John Stuart Mill a "wooly man of mush" and speculated that Mill's "soft" personality led his economic thought astray. Rothbard was critical of monetarist economist Milton Friedman. In his polemic "Milton Friedman Unraveled", he called Friedman a "statist", a "favorite of the establishment", a friend of and an "apologist" for Richard Nixon, and a "pernicious influence" on public policy. Rothbard said that libertarians should scorn rather than celebrate Friedman's academic prestige and political influence. Noting that Rothbard has "been nasty to me and my work", Friedman responded to Rothbard's criticism by calling him a "cult builder and a dogmatist".

In a memorial volume published by the Mises Institute, Rothbard's protégé and libertarian theorist Hans-Hermann Hoppe wrote that Man, Economy, and State "presented a blistering refutation of all variants of mathematical economics" and included it among Rothbard's "almost mind-boggling achievements". Hoppe lamented that, like Mises, Rothbard died without winning the Nobel Prize and, while acknowledging that Rothbard and his work were largely ignored by academia, called him an "intellectual giant" comparable to Aristotle, John Locke, and Immanuel Kant.

==== Disputes with other Austrian economists ====
Georgetown Professor Randy Barnett says, regarding Rothbard's "insistence on complete ideological purity", that "[a]lmost every intellectual who entered his orbit was eventually spun off, or self-emancipated, for some deviation or another. For this reason, the circle around Rothbard was always small." Although he self-identified as an Austrian economist, Rothbard's methodology was at odds with that of many other Austrians. In 1956, Rothbard deprecated the views of Austrian economist Fritz Machlup, stating that Machlup was no praxeologist and calling him instead a "positivist" who failed to represent the views of Ludwig von Mises. Rothbard noted that, in fact, Machlup shared the opposing positivist view associated with economist Milton Friedman. Mises and Machlup had been colleagues in 1920s Vienna before each relocated to the United States, and Mises later urged his American protege Israel Kirzner to pursue his PhD studies with Machlup at Johns Hopkins University.

According to libertarian economists Tyler Cowen and Richard Fink, Rothbard wrote that the term evenly rotating economy (ERE) could be used to analyze complexity in a world of change. Mises introduced ERE as an alternative nomenclature for the mainstream economic method of static equilibrium and general equilibrium analysis. Cowen and Fink found "serious inconsistencies in both the nature of the ERE and its suggested uses". With the sole exception of Rothbard, no other economist adopted Mises' term, and the concept continued to be called "equilibrium analysis".

In a 2011 article critical of Rothbard's "reflexive opposition" to inflation, The Economist noted that his views were increasingly gaining influence among politicians and laypeople on the right. The article contrasted Rothbard's categorical rejection of inflationary policies with the monetary views of "sophisticated Austrian-school monetary economists such as George Selgin and Lawrence H. White", [who] follow Hayek in treating stability of nominal spending as a monetary ideal—a position "not all that different from Mr [Scott] Sumner's". According to economist Peter Boettke, Rothbard is better described as a property rights economist than as an Austrian economist. In 1988, Boettke noted that Rothbard "vehemently attacked all of the books of the younger Austrians".

=== Ethics ===
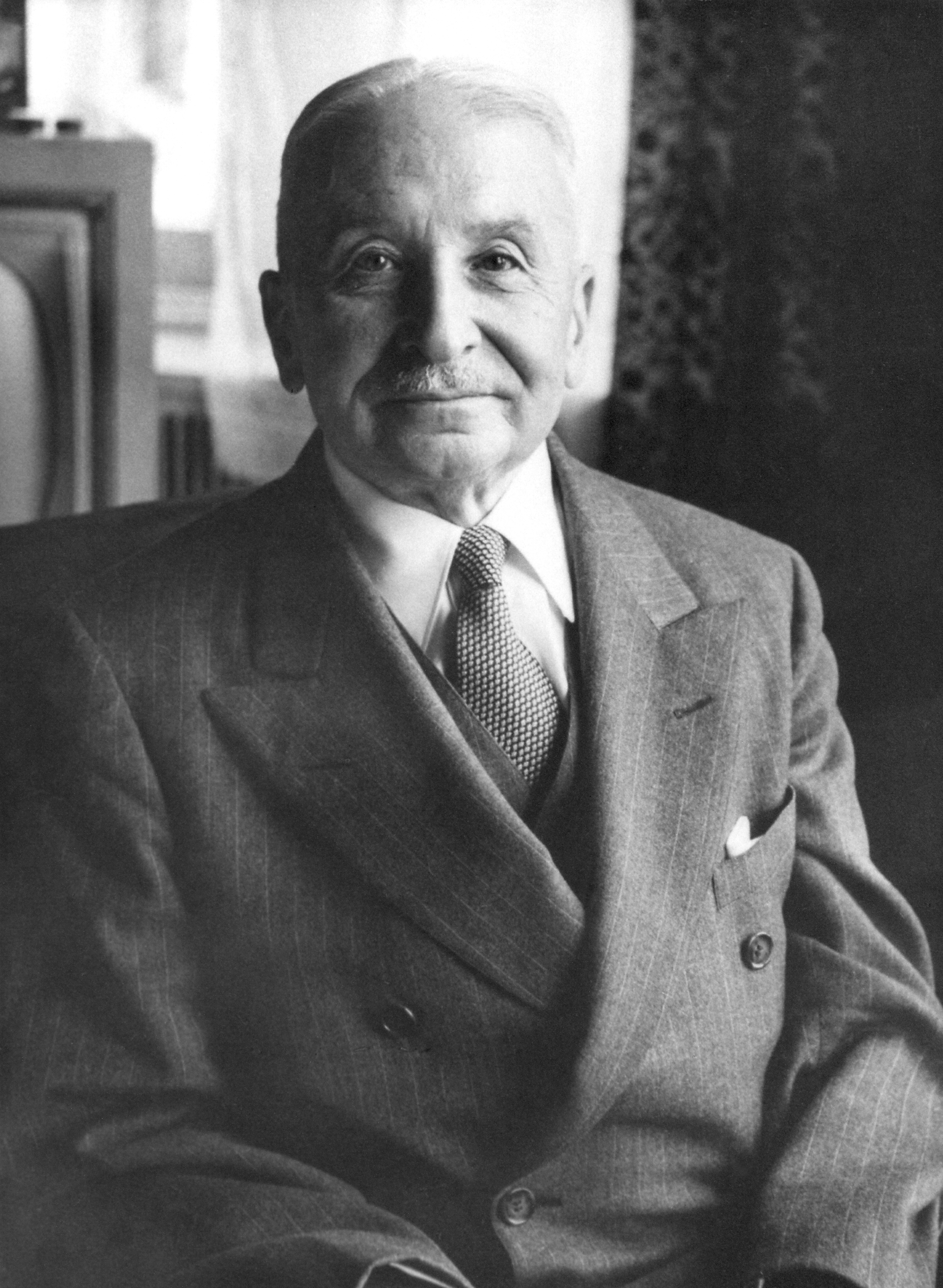
Ludwig von Mises

Although Rothbard adopted Ludwig von Mises' deductive methodology for his social theory and economics, he parted with Mises on the question of ethics. Specifically, he rejected Mises' conviction that ethical values remain subjective and opposed utilitarianism in favor of principle-based, natural law reasoning. In defense of his free-market views, Mises employed utilitarian economic arguments to contend that interventionist policies worsened society. Rothbard countered that interventionist policies do, in fact, benefit some people, including certain government employees and beneficiaries of social programs. Therefore, unlike Mises, Rothbard argued for an objective, natural-law basis for the free market. He called this principle "self-ownership", loosely basing the idea on the writings of John Locke and also borrowing concepts from classical liberalism and the anti-imperialism of the Old Right.

Rothbard accepted the labor theory of property for original appropriation but rejected the Lockean proviso, arguing that if an individual mixes his labor with unowned land, then he becomes the proper owner eternally and that after that time, it is private property which may change hands only by trade or gift. Rothbard was a strong critic of egalitarianism. The title essay of Rothbard's 1974 book Egalitarianism as a Revolt Against Nature and Other Essays held: "Equality is not in the natural order of things, and the crusade to make everyone equal in every respect (except before the law) is certain to have disastrous consequences." In it, Rothbard wrote: "At the heart of the egalitarian left is the pathological belief that there is no structure of reality; that all the world is a tabula rasa that can be changed at any moment in any desired direction by the mere exercise of human will." Rothbard argued that enforced egalitarianism violates the natural rights to self-ownership and property derived from classical liberal thinkers like John Locke, inevitably requiring state coercion that undermines individual liberty and leads to economic inefficiency and social conflict. He contrasted this with equality before the law as the only just form of equality compatible with a free society.

Noam Chomsky critiqued Rothbard's ideal society as "a world so full of hate that no human being would want to live in it ... First of all, it couldn't function for a second—and if it could, all you'd want to do is get out, or commit suicide or something." The philosopher James. W. Child has even questioned whether Rothbard and other similar libertarians can sustain a standard of fraud.

=== Anarcho-capitalism ===
According to anarcho-capitalists, various theorists have espoused legal philosophies similar to anarcho-capitalism; however, Rothbard was credited with coining the terms "anarcho-capitalist" and "anarch-capitalism" in 1971 (though "anarchocapitalism [sic]" had been attested earliest in Karl Hess's 1969 essay The Death of Politics). He synthesized elements from the Austrian School of economics, classical liberalism and 19th-century American individualist anarchists into a right-wing form of anarchism. According to his protégé Hans-Hermann Hoppe, "[t]here would be no anarcho-capitalist movement to speak of without Rothbard". Lew Rockwell in a memoriam called Rothbard the "conscience" of all the various strains of what he described as "libertarian anarchism", and said their advocates had often been personally inspired by his example.

During his years at graduate school in the late 1940s, Rothbard considered whether strict adherence to libertarian and laissez-faire principles required the abolition of the state altogether. He visited Baldy Harper, a founder of the Foundation for Economic Education, who doubted the need for any government whatsoever. Rothbard said that during this period, he was influenced by 19th-century American individualist anarchists like Lysander Spooner and Benjamin Tucker and the Belgian economist Gustave de Molinari who wrote about how such a system could work. Thus, he "combined the laissez-faire economics of Mises with the absolutist views of human rights and rejection of the state" from individualist anarchists. Edward Stringham opined that: "In the late 1940s, Murray Rothbard decided that that [sic] private-property anarchism was the logical conclusion of free-market thinking [...]."

Rothbard began to consider himself a "private property anarchist" and published works about private property anarchism in 1954; later, in 1971, he began to use "anarcho-capitalist" to describe his political ideology. In his anarcho-capitalist model, the system of private property is upheld by private firms, such as hypothesized protection agencies, which compete in a free market and are voluntarily supported by consumers who choose to use their protective and judicial services. Anarcho-capitalists describe this as "the end of the state monopoly on force". In this way, Rothbard differed from Mises, who favored a state to uphold markets.

In an unpublished article, Rothbard wrote that economically speaking, individualist anarchism differs from anarcho-capitalism and jokingly pondered whether libertarians should adopt the term nonarchist. Rothbard concluded the article by affirming that he is neither an anarchist nor an "archist" but a middle-of-the-roader on the archy question. In Man, Economy, and State, Rothbard divides the various kinds of state intervention into three categories: "autistic intervention" (interference with private non-economic activities), "binary intervention", (exchange between individuals and the state); and "triangular intervention" (state-mandated exchange between individuals). Sanford Ikeda wrote that Rothbard's typology "eliminates the gaps and inconsistencies that appear in Mises's original formulation". Rothbard writes in Power and Market that the role of the economist in a free market is limited, but it is much larger in a government that solicits economic policy recommendations. Rothbard argues that self-interest, therefore, prejudices the views of many economists in favor of increased government intervention.

=== Race, gender, and civil rights ===
Michael O'Malley, associate professor of history at George Mason University, describes Rothbard's tone toward the civil rights movement and the women's suffrage movement as "contemptuous and hostile". Rothbard criticized women's rights activists, attributing the growth of the welfare state to politically active spinsters "whose busybody inclinations were not fettered by the responsibilities of home and hearth". Rothbard argued that varieties of progressivism during the Progressive Era and after, which he regarded as a noxious influence on the United States, was spearheaded by a coalition of Yankee Protestants (people from the six New England states and upstate New York who were Protestants of English descent), Jewish women and "lesbian spinsters".

Rothbard, still on the theme of feminism, wrote that "too many American men live in a matriarchy, dominated first by Momism, then by female teachers, and then by their wives", and that women were advantaged because they were supported by their husbands. Rothbard's negative view of feminism can also be found in the 1991 article The Great Thomas & Hill Show: Stopping The Monstrous Regiment, where he wrote "At the risk of alienating my atheist libertarian friends, I think it increasingly clear that conservatives are right: that some religion is going to be dominant in every society. And that if Christianity, for example, is scorned and tossed out, some horrendous form of religion is going to take its place: whether it be Communism, New Age occultism, feminism, or Left-Puritanism. There is no getting around this basic truth of human nature."

Rothbard called for the elimination of "the entire 'civil rights' structure," which he said "tramples on the property rights of every American." He consistently favored repeal of the 1964 Civil Rights Act, including Title VII regarding employment discrimination, and called for overturning the Brown v. Board of Education decision on the grounds that state-mandated integration of schools violated libertarian principles. In an essay called "Right-wing Populism", Rothbard proposed a set of measures to "reach out" to the "middle and working classes", which included urging the police to crack down on "street criminals", writing that "cops must be unleashed" and "allowed to administer instant punishment, subject of course to liability when they are in error". He also advocated that the police "clear the streets of bums and vagrants."

Rothbard held strong opinions about many leaders of the civil rights movement. He considered black separatist Malcolm X to be a "great black leader" and integrationist Martin Luther King Jr. to be favored by whites because he "was the major restraining force on the developing Negro revolution". Jacob Jensen writes that Rothbard's commentary from the 1960s, approving of both "black power" and "white power" in separated communities, amounted to support for racial segregation. In 1993, Rothbard rejected the vision of a "separate black nation", asking, "Does anyone really believe that ... New Africa would be content to strike out on its own, with no massive "foreign aid" from the U.S.A.?" Rothbard also suggested that opposition to Martin Luther King Jr., whom he demeaned as a "coercive integrationist", should be a litmus test for members of his "paleolibertarian" political movement.

Rothbard is described by the historian John P. Jackson Jr. as espousing antisemitism despite Rothbard's own background as a secular Jew. One former student described Rothbard as privately using the anti-Jewish slur "kikes" repeatedly. Rothbard also befriended the Holocaust deniers Willis Carto and Harry Elmer Barnes.

=== Views on war ===
Like Randolph Bourne, Rothbard believed that "war is the health of the state". According to David Gordon, this was the reason for Rothbard's opposition to aggressive foreign policy. Rothbard believed that stopping new wars was necessary and that knowing how the government had led citizens into earlier wars was important. Two essays expanded on these views: "War, Peace, and the State" and "Anatomy of the State". Rothbard used insights from Vilfredo Pareto, Gaetano Mosca, and Robert Michels to build a model of state personnel, goals, and ideology.

Rothbard's colleague Joseph Stromberg notes that Rothbard made two exceptions to his general condemnation of war: "the American Revolution and the War for Southern Independence, as viewed from the Confederate side", referring to the American Civil War. Rothbard condemned the "Northern war against slavery", saying it was inspired by "fanatical" religious faith and characterized by "a cheerful willingness to uproot institutions, to commit mayhem and mass murder, to plunder and loot and destroy, all in the name of high moral principle". He celebrated Jefferson Davis, Robert E. Lee, and other prominent Confederates as heroes while denouncing Abraham Lincoln, Ulysses S. Grant, and other Union leaders, who he said had "opened the Pandora's Box of genocide and the extermination of civilians". Rothbard saw secession movements as a tool for undermining and disintegrating the state, according to historian Quinn Slobodian, who wrote that "Rothbard's life was marked by a search for signs of potential secession" and that "When he found them, he did his best to deepen them."

=== Historical revisionism ===
Rothbard embraced "historical revisionism" as an antidote to what he perceived to be the dominant influence exerted by corrupt "court intellectuals" over mainstream historical narratives. His friend Harry Elmer Barnes, the Holocaust-denying historian, used similar language, "court historians". Rothbard wrote that these mainstream intellectuals distorted the historical record in favor of "the state" in exchange for "wealth, power, and prestige" from the state. Rothbard characterized the revisionist task as "penetrating the fog of lies and deception of the State and its Court Intellectuals, and to present to the public the true history".

Rothbard worked with antisemitic writers in developing an isolationist revisionist history of World War II. He was influenced by and called a champion of Barnes. Rothbard favorably cited Barnes' view that "the murder of Germans and Japanese was the overriding aim of World War II". In an obituary for Barnes, Rothbard wrote: "Our entry into World War II was the crucial act in foisting a permanent militarization upon the economy and society, in bringing to the country a permanent garrison state, an overweening military–industrial complex, a permanent system of conscription. It was the crucial act in creating a mixed economy run by Big Government, a system of state monopoly capitalism run by the central government in collaboration with Big Business and Big Unionism." Besides broadly supporting his historical views, Rothbard promoted Barnes as an influence for future revisionists.

Rothbard's endorsement of World War II revisionism and his association with Barnes and other Holocaust deniers have drawn criticism. Kevin D. Williamson wrote an opinion piece published by National Review which condemned Rothbard for "making common cause with the 'revisionist' historians of the Third Reich", a term he used to describe American Holocaust deniers associated with Rothbard, such as James J. Martin of the Institute for Historical Review. The piece also characterized "Rothbard and his faction" as being "culpably indulgent" of Holocaust denial, the view which "specifically denies that the Holocaust actually happened or holds that it was in some way exaggerated". In an article for Rothbard's 50th birthday, Rothbard's friend and Buffalo State College historian Ralph Raico stated that Rothbard "is the main reason that revisionism has become a crucial part of the whole libertarian position".

Rothbard was sympathetic to "6mm revisionism" (a euphemism for Holocaust denial disputing the six million figure of Jewish victims).

=== Middle East conflict ===
Rothbard's The Libertarian Forum blamed the Middle East conflict on Israeli aggression "fueled by American arms and money". Rothbard warned that the Middle East conflict would draw the United States into a world war. He was anti-Zionist and opposed United States involvement in the Middle East. Rothbard said the Camp David Accords betrayed Palestinian aspirations and opposed Israel's 1982 invasion of Lebanon.

In his essay, "War Guilt in the Middle East", Rothbard wrote that Israel refused "to let these refugees return and reclaim the property taken from them," and took negative views of a two-state solution for the Israeli–Palestinian conflict. He wrote: "On the one hand there are the Palestinian Arabs, who have tilled the soil or otherwise used the land of Palestine for centuries; and on the other, there are a group of external fanatics, who come from all over the world, and who claim the entire land area as 'given' to them as a collective religion or tribe at some remote or legendary time in the past. There is no way the two claims can be resolved to the satisfaction of both parties. There can be no genuine settlement, no 'peace' in the face of this irrepressible conflict; there can only be either a war to the death, or an uneasy practical compromise which can satisfy no one."

=== Children's rights and parental obligations ===
In the Ethics of Liberty, Rothbard explores issues regarding children's rights regarding self-ownership and contract. These include support for a woman's right to abortion, condemnation of parents showing aggression towards children and opposition to the state forcing parents to care for children. He also holds children have the right to run away from parents and seek new guardians as soon as they are able to choose to do so. He argued that parents have the right to put a child out for adoption or sell the rights to the child in a voluntary contract in what Rothbard suggests will be a "flourishing free market in children". He believes that selling children as consumer goods in accord with market forces—while "superficially monstrous"—will benefit "everyone" involved in the market: "the natural parents, the children, and the foster parents purchasing".

In Rothbard's view of parenthood, "the parent should not have a legal obligation to feed, clothe, or educate his children, since such obligations would entail positive acts coerced upon the parent and depriving the parent of his rights." Thus, Rothbard stated that parents should have the legal right to let any infant die by starvation and should be free to engage in other forms of child neglect. However, according to Rothbard, "the purely free society will have a flourishing free market in children". In a fully libertarian society, he wrote, "the existence of a free baby market will bring such 'neglect' down to a minimum". Economist Gene Callahan of Cardiff University, formerly a scholar at the Rothbard-affiliated Mises Institute, wrote that Rothbard allowed "the logical elegance of his legal theory" to "trump any arguments based on the moral reprehensibility of a parent idly watching her six-month-old child slowly starve to death in its crib".

=== Retributive theory of criminal justice ===
In The Ethics of Liberty, Rothbard advocates for a "frankly retributive theory of punishment" or a system of "a tooth (or two teeth) for a tooth". Rothbard emphasizes that all punishment must be proportional, stating that "the criminal, or invader, loses his rights to the extent that he deprived another man of his". Applying his retributive theory, Rothbard states that a thief "must pay double the extent of theft". Rothbard gives the example of a thief who stole $15,000 and says he must return the stolen money and provide the victim an additional $15,000, money to which the thief has forfeited his right. The thief would be "put in a [temporary] state of enslavement to his victim" if he is unable to pay him immediately. Rothbard also applies his theory to justify beating and torturing violent criminals, although the beatings are required to be proportional to the crime.

==== Torture of criminal suspects ====
In chapter twelve of Ethics, Rothbard turns his attention to suspects arrested by the police. He argues that police should be able to torture certain types of criminal suspects, including accused murderers, for information related to their alleged crimes. Writes Rothbard: "Suppose... police beat and torture a suspected murderer to find information (not to wring a confession, since obviously a coerced confession could never be considered valid). If the suspect turns out to be guilty, then the police should be exonerated, for then they have only ladled out to the murderer a parcel of what he deserves in return; his rights had already been forfeited by more than that extent. But if the suspect is not convicted, then that means that the police have beaten and tortured an innocent man, and that they in turn must be put into the dock for criminal assault". Gene Callahan examines this position and concludes that Rothbard rejects the widely held belief that torture is inherently wrong, no matter who the victim. Callahan goes on to state that Rothbard's scheme gives the police a strong motive to frame the suspect after having tortured him or her.

=== Science and scientism ===
In an essay condemning "scientism in the study of man", Rothbard rejected the application of causal determinism to human beings, arguing that the actions of human beings—as opposed to those of everything else in nature—are not determined by prior causes, but by "free will". He argued that "determinism as applied to man, is a self-contradictory thesis, since the man who employs it relies implicitly on the existence of free will". Rothbard opposed what he considered the overspecialization of the academy and sought to fuse the disciplines of economics, history, ethics and political science to create a "science of liberty". Rothbard described the moral basis for his anarcho-capitalist position in two of his books: For a New Liberty, published in 1973; and The Ethics of Liberty, published in 1982. In his Power and Market (1970), Rothbard describes how a stateless economy might function.

== Works ==
=== Books ===
- Man, Economy, and State. D. Van Nostrand (1962). full text.

2nd ed. (Scholar's Ed.) published in Auburn, AL: Ludwig von Mises Institute (2004). ISBN 0-945466-30-7. Full text.

- The Panic of 1819: Reactions and Policies. New York: Columbia University Press (1962). Full text.

Republished, Auburn, AL: Ludwig von Mises Institute (2004). ISBN 1-933550-08-2.

- America's Great Depression. D. Van Nostrand (1963). Full text.

5th ed. published in Auburn, AL: Ludwig von Mises Institute (2005). ISBN 0-945466-05-6.

- Power and Market: Government and the Economy. Sheed Andrews and McMeel (1970). full text.

Republished, Auburn, AL: Ludwig von Mises Institute (2004). ISBN 0-945466-30-7.

- For a New Liberty: The Libertarian Manifesto. Collier Books (1973). Full text; audiobook. Auburn, AL: Ludwig von Mises Institute. ISBN 0-945466-47-1.
- Anatomy of the State. Auburn, AL: Ludwig von Mises Institute (1974). Full text.; audiobook.

Republished in Auburn, AL: Ludwig von Mises Institute (2009). ISBN 978-1-933550-48-0.

- Egalitarianism as a Revolt Against Nature and Other Essays. Libertarian Review Press (1974). Full text.

2nd ed., Auburn, AL: Ludwig von Mises Institute (2000). ISBN 0-945466-23-4.

- Conceived in Liberty (4 vol.). New Rochelle, New York: Arlington House (1975–1979). Full text.

Republished, Auburn, AL: Ludwig von Mises Institute (2012). ISBN 0-945466-26-9.

- The Logic of Action (2 vol.). Edward Elgar Publications (1997). ISBN 1-85898-015-1, 1-85898-570-6. Full text.

Reprinted as Economic Controversies. Auburn, AL: Ludwig von Mises Institute (2011).

- The Ethics of Liberty. Humanities Press (1982). New York University Press (1998). Full text; audiobook. Auburn, AL: Ludwig von Mises Institute. ISBN 0-8147-7506-3.
- The Mystery of Banking. Richardson and Snyder, Dutton (1983). Full text.

Republished in Auburn, AL: Ludwig von Mises Institute (2007). ISBN 978-1-105-52878-1.

- The Case Against the Fed. Auburn, AL: Ludwig von Mises Institute (1994). Full text.

Republished in Auburn, AL: Ludwig von Mises Institute (2007). ISBN 0-945466-17-X.

- America's Great Depression [5th ed.]. Auburn, AL: Ludwig von Mises Institute (2000).
- An Austrian Perspective on the History of Economic Thought (2 vol.). Edward Elgar Publishers (1995). ISBN 0-945466-48-X.
  - Vol. 1: Economic Thought Before Adam Smith. Republished in Auburn, AL: Ludwig von Mises Institute (2009).
  - Vol. 2: Classical Economics. Republished in Auburn, AL: Ludwig von Mises Institute (2009).
- Making Economic Sense. Auburn, Alab: Ludwig von Mises Institute (2007). ISBN 0-945466-18-8. Full text.
- The Betrayal of the American Right. Auburn, Alab: Ludwig von Mises Institute (2007). ISBN 978-1-933550-13-8. Full text and audiobook, narrated by Ian Temple.

Despite posthumous publication in 2007, it appears in print virtually unchanged from the manuscript untouched since the 1970s.

- The Progressive Era. Auburn, AL: Ludwig von Mises Institute (2017). ISBN 978-1-61016-674-4. Full text.

=== Book contributions ===
- Introduction to Capital, Interest, and Rent: Essays in the Theory of Distribution, by Frank A. Fetter. Kansas City: Sheed Andrews and McMeel (1977).
- Foreword to The Theory of Money and Credit, by Ludwig von Mises. Liberty Fund (1981). Full text .
- "Bramble Minibook" (1973). In: The Essential von Mises. Auburn, AL: Ludwig von Mises Institute (1988). Full text.

=== Monographs ===
- Wall Street, Banks, and American Foreign Policy. World Market Perspective (1984); Center for Libertarian Studies (1995); Ludwig von Mises Institute (2005). Spanish translation.

=== Selected articles ===
- Primary anthology of [selected] essays by Murray N. Rothbard: "THE IRREPRESSIBLE ROTHBARD; Essays of Murray N. Rothbard / Edited with an introduction by Llewellyn H. Rockwell, Jr. / Preface by JoAnn Rothbard"
- The Individualist (Apr., Jul.–Aug. 1971); Revised and republished by the Center for Independent Education (1979). OCLC 3710568.
- "Soviet Foreign Policy: A Revisionist Perspective." Libertarian Review (Apr. 1978), pp. 23–27.
- "His Only Crime Was Against the Old Guard: Milken." Los Angeles Times (March 3, 1992).
- "Anti-Buchanania: A Mini-Encyclopedia." Rothbard-Rockwell Report (May 1992), pp. 1–13.
- "Saint Hillary and the Religious Left." (Dec. 1994).
- "The Other Side of the Coin: Free Banking in Chile." Austrian Economics Newsletter, vol. 10, no. 2.

== Interviews ==
- "Interview with Murray Rothbard on Man, Economy, and State, Mises, and the Future of the Austrian School" (Summer 1990). Austrian Economics Newsletter.

== See also ==
- American philosophy
- Alt-right#Influences
- Anarcho-capitalism
- Criticism of the Federal Reserve
- Libertarianism in the United States
- List of American philosophers
- List of peace activists
