= Austrian Economics Newsletter =

Newsletter published by the Mises Institute

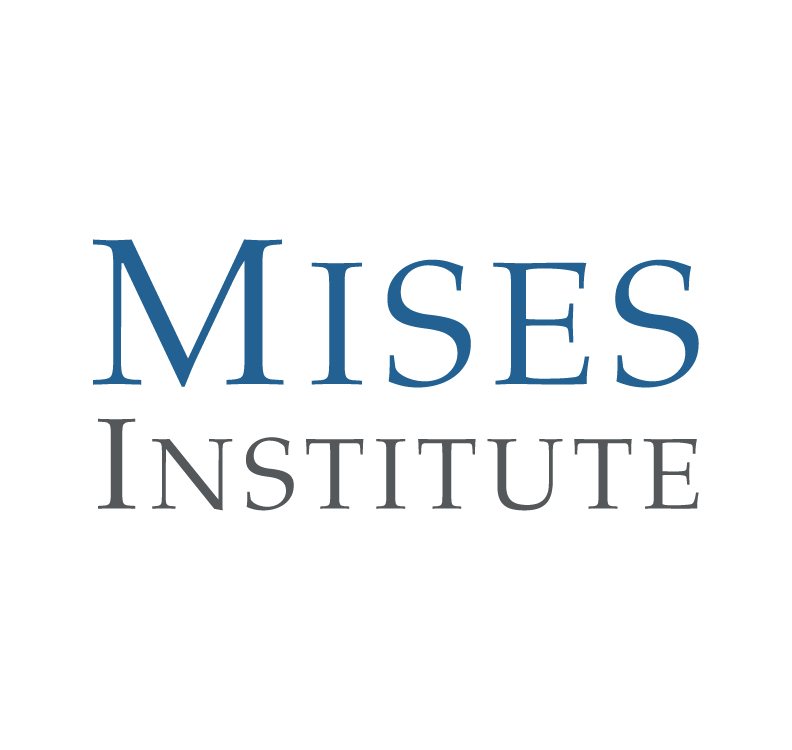
- Type: Newsletter
- Format: Print (original), PDF (online archives)
- Owner: Ludwig von Mises Institute
- Publisher: Ludwig von Mises Institute, Center for Libertarian Studies(1977-1984)
- Founded: Fall of 1977
- Language: English
- Headquarters: 518 West Magnolia Avenue; Auburn, Alabama 36832-4528; United States
- ISSN: 1045-3288
- Website: mises.org/library/periodical/austrian-economics-newsletter

Austrian Economics Newsletter is a newsletter that was published quarterly by the Ludwig von Mises Institute until Winter 2003. It was established in the fall of 1977 and published by the Center for Libertarian Studies, but moved to the Mises Institute in 1984. The newsletter covers economics from the Austrian school perspective.

On its official website, there are quarterly newsletters and various presentations of the views of Austrian economists, such as academic books and journals, events, videos, blogs, and podcasts. Scholars and experts visiting various fields are published in each issue.

The point of the newsletter page is that they interviewed many experts and scholars at the same time through the author's interview, then can guess more different content through their conversation, especially for the "future trend" of Austrians. For people, this newsletter analyzes the comparison of the past and future of the Austrian school for the economy, and summarize and analyze the differences and similarities. The data provided by several academic experts in their field can be compared with their interview data from a long time ago, therefore, it may draw interesting comparisons.

Through the newsletter published every quarter, we can understand the friction between theory, environment and scholars from different schools. Austrian economics letter uses different theories and cases to compare and discuss from the traditional economic concept of the Austrian school and different schools in each period, and each view is based on the traditional 19th century theory. The Austrian school is to continue the thought of the economic school in the 15th century, therefore, it will fall behind many economic schools in terms of theory, relevant views and ideas, such as the difference between the Austrian school and Keynesian economics.

== History ==
The Austrian Economics Newsletter was first published in the Center for Liberal Studies (CLS) from 1977 to 1984. The purpose of this organization is an American non-profit organization dominated by Anarchic capitalism and liberalism. It was founded by Murray Rothbard and Burton Blumert in 1976. This organization was developed from the liberal conference, headquartered in New York, and most of the early meetings were held in New York, but later the organization moved to Burlingame, California. The Libertarian Research Center held conferences, seminars, dinners and other meetings, etc.

In 1982, Rothbard and Blumert, together with Lew Rockwell, founded a free attention non-profit Mises Institute, which is a liberal non-profit Institute. The founding motivation of this institute involved promoting the specific contribution of Ludwig von Mises. Many scholars worried that his research results would be ignored by liberal institutions funded by other scholars, therefore they founded the Institute on the premise of ensuring and continuing his achievements. The philosophy defined by this research institute is practice and economics. It develops inferences through deduction. The conclusions obtained according to these statements will be more objective and universal for the analysis of human behavior, however, there is a lot of space for the discussion of this inferential form of economics.

Center for Liberal Studies published and sponsored many newsletters, papers, periodicals, articles and special topics, etc. from 1977 to 2000, including not only scholars, but also students and scholars who have studied in this field, and even the Journal of libertarian studies, which was evaluated by academic scholars in the same field. It was founded by Murray and was based on non interventionism, liberalism, etc, And other political positions as the promotion place of the primary principle. Now it is also published by Ludwig von Mises Institute, and continues to promote the papers published by political scholars of various sects.

Due to the early environment, there were only paper-based newsletters at the beginning, so most readers only have experts, scholars and students who are interested in or have research in this field. However, with the change of time and environment, the original paper release has been transferred to electronic online. Therefore, in the era of promotion and information connection, readers span more and read more conveniently. Furthermore, at the beginning, only discussed the school of Austrian economics. Most of the articles are about the differences between this school and other schools or the discussion of new theories. From a neutral perspective, you will feel that the early words are too subjective and biased towards Austrian economics, Although the original creation of this newsletter is to promote and discuss Austrian economics, or explore each other through philosophy and economics. For example, in the early articles published in 1990, the whole article mainly discusses the problem "apriorism" in the field of philosophy. The author completes the whole article through the central theoretical thought of Mises Institute. Therefore, it will appear more subjective under the reading and understanding of supporters of other sects. Although there is no absolute right or wrong in the field of philosophy, and the supporters of each side are with more subjective arguments, the progress and new discoveries will be made only when theories collide or oppose each other, and each side has its own supporters.

With the development of time, environment and technology, the current Australian economics newsletter is published online.

=== Austrian Economics vs. Keynesian Economics ===
The classical school of economics emphasizes the atmosphere of laissez faire. They believe that when businesses want to produce a product, there must be a reason. They will not produce an unproductive product for no reason, that is to say, every commodity will be created only when there is demand. Their main proposition is "Say's law", which believes that the government should rule by inaction without being responsible for the market, because just like the most basic ethics of supply and demand in economics, someone will make up for the lack of supply and goods, and the price, cost and profit of all goods will return to the original line. Therefore, this equilibrium will also be in everyone's interests on the premise that no one knows and according to the self-interest pursued by each businessman, customer and operator.

Keynesian economics began to rise after 1930. They believed that the government needed to make some intervention to give the economy a chance to take off and wake up. At that time, this theory was also adopted by former US President Roosevelt. Keynes believed that because the effective demand is not enough, he believed that the government should intervene and participate in economic activities. Only through the government's policies could the market be effectively stimulated, resulting in the increase of market demand, which is associated with the increase of productivity and employment levels of the population at that time. They believe that it is because the national employment rate has decreased and the number of unemployed has increased. The decline of national income has led to the shortage of national consumption and the decline of consumption level., when the economy is declining, the government needs to join in to increase and stimulate market demand. There only when the government takes the lead in increasing expenditure and driving the employment rate can we improve people's income. Although the government's funds may become scarlet letters, it can stimulate people's economy and improve people's income in a short time.

== Comparison of articles in different periods ==
Interviewing experts in the field lets readers understand the opinions of different scholars and displays the diversity of the field.

In 1996, the newsletter was still published on paper, so the content of the interview was presented in transcript. Because of the words, the whole article was a verbatim record of the Austrian Economics Newsletter’s editor and James grant.

With the change of time, AEN has gradually changed from printing to online web pages. The presentation of the interview includes not only the complete version of the text, but also the videos taken during the interview are put on the web page, therefore, people can listen to the experts' views more vividly. Even some proper nouns or experts' names on the web page are attached with hyperlink, to let readers search more quickly.

Moreover, by 2022, according to the living habits of modern people, people are used to listening to music or podcasts on vehicles or when walking. AEN also released a podcast of this article at the same time of publishing an article, so that more people can learn about new knowledge in this field in their lives.

== Features and Operations ==
1. Austrian School Topics - As the topics of writing are becoming more diversified, articles, podcasts and videos about economy are all classified here.
2. Austrian Economics Overview
3. Business Cycles
4. Calculation and Knowledge
5. Cantillon
6. Capital and Interest Theory - By explaining these two terms and analyzing current events, readers can understand the market.
7. Entrepreneurship - Teach the precautions and basic instructions for entrepreneurship in combination with local legal knowledge.
8. Fiscal Theory - Understand the trend of the country by analyzing the current financial reports of the government.
9. Gold Standard
10. History of the Austrian School of Economics
11. Interventionism
12. Monetary Theory
13. Money and Banking
14. Money Supply
15. Monopoly and Competition
16. Other schools of Thought
17. Philosophy and Methodology
18. Political Theory
19. Praxeology
20. Prices
21. Private Property
22. Production Theory
23. Subjectivism
24. Value and Exchange

== See also ==
- Ludwig von Mises Institute
- Center for Libertarian Studies
