= Old Right (United States) =

Branch of American conservatism (c. 1910–1950s)

The Old Right, also called the Old Guard, is an informal designation used for a branch of American conservatism that was most prominent from 1910 to the mid-1950s. However, it never became an organized movement. Most members were Republicans, although there was a conservative Democratic element based largely in the Southern United States. They are termed the "Old Right" to distinguish them from their New Right successors who came to prominence in the 1960s, 1970s, and 1980s.

Most were unified by their defense of authority, tradition, morality, religion, limited government, rule of law, civic nationalism, capitalism, social conservatism, anti-Communism, anti-socialism, anti-Zionism, and anti-imperialism, as well as their skepticism of egalitarianism and democracy and the growing power of Washington. The Old Right typically favored laissez-faire classical liberalism; some were free market conservatives; others were ex-radical leftists who moved sharply to the right, such as the novelist John Dos Passos. Still others, such as the Democrat Southern Agrarians, were traditionalists who dreamed of restoring a pre-modern communal society. Above all, Murray Rothbard wrote, the Old Right were unified by opposition to what they saw as the danger of "domestic dictatorship" by Democratic President Franklin Roosevelt and his New Deal program.

The Old Right has de facto faded as an organized movement, but many similar ideas are found among paleoconservatives and paleolibertarians.

== History and views ==
The Old Right came into being when the Republican Party (GOP) split in 1910, and was influential within that party into the 1940s. They pushed Theodore Roosevelt and his progressive followers out in 1912. From 1933, many Democrats became associated with the Old Right through their opposition to Franklin D. Roosevelt (FDR) and his New Deal Coalition, and with the Republicans formed the Conservative Coalition to block its initiatives. Conservatives disagreed on foreign policy, and the Old Right favored non-interventionist policies on Europe at the start of World War II. After the war, they opposed President Harry Truman's domestic and foreign policies. The last major battle was led by Ohio Senator Robert A. Taft, who was defeated by Dwight D Eisenhower for the presidential nomination in 1952. The new conservative movement later led by William F. Buckley, Jr., Barry Goldwater and Ronald Reagan adopted much of the domestic anti-New Deal conservatism of the Old Right, but broke with it by demanding free trade and an aggressive, internationalist, interventionist, and anti-communist foreign policy.

Historian George H. Nash argues:

Unlike the "moderate", internationalist, largely eastern bloc of Republicans who accepted (or at least acquiesced in) some of the "Roosevelt Revolution" and the essential premises of President Truman's foreign policy, the Republican Right at heart was counter-revolutionary. Anti-collectivist, anti-Communist, anti-New Deal, passionately committed to limited government, free market economics, and congressional (as opposed to executive) prerogatives, the G.O.P. conservatives were obliged to wage a constant two-front war: against liberal Democrats from without and "me-too" Republicans from within.

The Old Right emerged in opposition to the New Deal and to FDR personally; it drew from multiple sources. Hoff says, "moderate Republicans and leftover Republican Progressives like Hoover composed the bulk of the Old Right by 1940, with a sprinkling of former members of the Farmer–Labor party, Non-Partisan League, and even a few midwestern prairie Socialists."

By 1937, partisans of the Old Right had formed a Conservative coalition that controlled Congress until 1964. They were consistently non-interventionist and opposed entering World War II, a position exemplified by the America First Committee. Later, most opposed U.S. entry into NATO and intervention in the Korean War. "In addition to being staunch opponents of war and militarism, the Old Right of the postwar period had a rugged and near-libertarian honesty in domestic affairs as well."

This anti-New Deal movement was a coalition of multiple groups: business Republicans like Robert A. Taft and Raymond E. Baldwin; conservative Democrats like Josiah Bailey, Al Smith and John W. Davis; libertarians like H. L. Mencken and Garet Garrett and mass media tycoons like William Randolph Hearst and Colonel Robert R. McCormick.

In his 1986 book Conservatism: Dream and Reality, Robert Nisbet noted the traditional hostility of the right to interventionism and to increases in military expenditure:

Of all the misascriptions of the word 'conservative' during the last four years, the most amusing, in an historical light, is surely the application of 'conservative' to the last-named. For in America throughout the twentieth century, and including four substantial wars abroad, conservatives had been steadfastly the voices of non-inflationary military budgets, and of an emphasis on trade in the world instead of American nationalism. In the two World Wars, in Korea, and in Viet Nam, the leaders of American entry into war were such renowned liberal-progressives as Woodrow Wilson, Franklin Roosevelt, Harry Truman and John F. Kennedy. In all four episodes conservatives, both in the national government and in the rank and file, were largely hostile to intervention; were isolationists indeed.

Jeff Riggenbach argues that some members of the Old Right were actually classical liberals and "were accepted members of the 'Left' before 1933. Yet, without changing any of their fundamental views, all of them, over the next decade, came to be thought of as exemplars of the political 'Right'."

== Internal differences ==
While outsiders thought Taft was the epitome of the conservative wing of the Republican Party, inside the party he was repeatedly criticized by hard-liners who were alarmed by his sponsorship of New Deal-like programs, especially federal housing for the poor, and federal aid to public schools. The real estate lobby was especially fearful about public housing. Senator Kenneth Wherry discerned a "touch of socialism" in Taft, while his Ohio colleague Senator John Bricker speculated that perhaps the "socialists have gotten to Bob Taft". This distrust on the right hurt Taft's 1948 presidential ambitions.

The Southern Agrarian wing drew on some of the values and anxieties being articulated on the anti-modern right, including the desire to retain the social authority and defend the autonomy of the American states and regions, especially the South. Donald Davidson was one of the most politically active of the agrarians, especially in his criticisms of the TVA in his native Tennessee. The Southern Agrarians articulated old values of Jeffersonian Democracy. Paul V. Murphy explains that they "called for a return to the small-scale economy of rural America as a means to preserve the cultural amenities of the society they knew." Instead of science and efficiency, they preferred to rely on religion to uphold social order and values.

== Notable figures ==
- President William Howard Taft
- President Warren G. Harding
- President Calvin Coolidge
- President Herbert Hoover
- Senator Bennett Champ Clark, of Missouri
- Senator Josiah Bailey, of North Carolina
- Senator Harry F. Byrd, of Virginia
- Senator John W. Bricker, of Ohio
- Representative Howard Buffett, of Nebraska
- Representative Hamilton Fish III, of New York
- John T. Flynn
- William Randolph Hearst
- Raymond C. Hoiles
- Albert Jay Nock
- John J. Raskob
- Representative Eugene Siler, of Kentucky
- Governor Al Smith, of New York
- Senator Robert A. Taft, of Ohio
- Senator William E. Jenner, of Indiana
- Senator Kenneth S. Wherry, of Nebraska
- General Robert E. Wood

== Legacy ==
Paleoconservatives and paleolibertarians are often considered the successors and torchbearers of the Old Right view in the late-20th century and the 21st century. Both of these groups often rally behind Old Right slogans such as "America First" while sharing similar views to the Old Right opposition to the New Deal and involvement in World War II (including Old Right objections to economic programs and loans of naval equipment to supply England, through the famous 'Blitz' of 1940–41 'Britain's Finest Hour', viewing such aid as likely to involve the US further). Recently, it has been suggested that some of the ideas of the Old Right have seen a resurgence in the 2008 and 2012 presidential campaigns of Ron Paul and the 2016 and 2020 presidential campaigns of Donald Trump.

== See also ==
- Libertarian conservatism
- Old Left

== General references ==
- Robert Morse Crunden (1999). The superfluous men. Isi Books. ISBN 978-1882926305.
- Cole, Wayne S. America First; The Battle Against Intervention, 1940–41 (1953)
- Doenecke, Justus D. "American Isolationism, 1939–1941", Journal of Libertarian Studies, Summer/Fall 1982, 6(3), pp. 201–216. online version
- Doenecke, Justus D. "Literature of Isolationism, 1972–1983: A Bibliographic Guide" Journal of Libertarian Studies, Spring 1983, 7(1), pp. 157–184. online version
- Frohnen, Bruce; Beer, Jeremy; and Nelson, Jeffery O., eds. American Conservatism: An Encyclopedia (2006)
- Murphy, Paul V. The Rebuke of History: The Southern Agrarians and American Conservative Thought (2001)
- Radosh, Ronald. Prophets on the right: Profiles of conservative critics of American globalism (1978)
- Raimondo, Justin. An Enemy of the State: The Life of Murray N. Rothbard (2000)
- Raimondo, Justin (1993). Reclaiming the American Right: The Lost Legacy of the Conservative Movement. Burlingame, CA: Center for Libertarian Studies. ISBN 9781883959005.
- Ribuffo, Leo. The Old Christian Right: The Protestant Far Right from the Great Depression to the Cold War. Temple University Press (1983)
- Rothbard, Murray. The Betrayal of the American Right (2007)
- Schneider, Gregory L. ed. Conservatism in America Since 1930: A Reader (2003)
- Schneider, Gregory L. The Conservative Century: From Reaction to Revolution (2009) pp. 1–38
- Scotchie, Joseph. The Paleoconservatives: New Voices of the Old Right (1999)
