= Austrian business cycle theory =

Economic theory

The Austrian business cycle theory (ABCT) is an economic theory developed by the Austrian School of economics. It seeks to explain the recurrent booms and busts (i.e., business cycles) as consequences of central banks intervention in the credit markets, primarily by fixing interest rates, arguably the most important price in the economy.

The theory views business cycles as the consequence of excessive growth in bank credit due to artificially low interest rates set by a central bank or fractional reserve banks. The Austrian business cycle theory has its roots in the 19th-century work of Eugen von Böhm-Bawerk on capital theory. It was later developed by Ludwig von Mises and Friedrich Hayek. Hayek won the Nobel Prize in Economics in 1974 (shared with Gunnar Myrdal) in part for his work on this theory.

According to Mises and Hayek, an expansion of bank credit, not backed by prior savings, pushes the market rate of interest below the "natural rate" that would coordinate savings and investments. This happens because capital is a highly disaggregated and specialized set of factors of production, and dedicating capital to different stages of production takes time and resources. The price of capital is interest rates, which reveal time preferences of money, and coordinate inter-temporal investments by entrepreneurs, who borrow from savers to make capital investments for producing output in the future.

Given the important role of interest rates, an artificial lowering of interest rates affects the market for loanable funds. As central banks try to inject liquidity into the economy, interest rates fall below their natural rate, affecting savings and investment and rendering the plans of savers and entrepreneurs inconsistent. Austrians argue that a credit-driven boom results in widespread malinvestment, as lower interest rates signal to businesses to borrow and invest to produce for the future, while consumers lower their savings and prefer to consume earlier, thereby reducing future consumption. A correction or credit crunch, commonly called a "recession" or "bust", occurs when the credit creation has run its course. The money supply then contracts (or its growth slows), causing a curative recession and eventually allowing resources to be reallocated efficiently.

The Austrian explanation of the business cycle differs significantly from mainstream understanding of business cycles and is generally rejected by mainstream economists. Austrian School theorists have continued to contest these conclusions. Several scholars have affirmed empirical evidence supporting the Austrian business cycle theory. Several noted economists, including former US Treasure Secretary and Chief Economist of the World Bank Lawrence Summers, who shared a similar perspective in his speech at the World Economic Forum in 2001, (Note: Reported as follows; "This expansion, he (Summers) argued, has been more like pre-war cycles, or like that in Japan in the late 1980s: that is, driven by credit. The absence of rising inflation has allowed the expansion to go on for longer, but at the cost of a greater accumulation of debt. Others have pointed to the similarity to credit and asset-price booms in Britain and Sweden in the late 1980s. The unwinding of excesses was accompanied by severe recession.") and had a similar expression for the 2008 financial crisis. The Economist noted in 2009 that "central bankers seemed to be coming around to Mr Summers' view of things—that low inflation and interest rates were enabling damaging bubbles and financial crises." Some have conceded that the wholesale rejection of Austrian ideas in the post-war era went too far.

== Mechanism ==
=== Malinvestment and boom ===
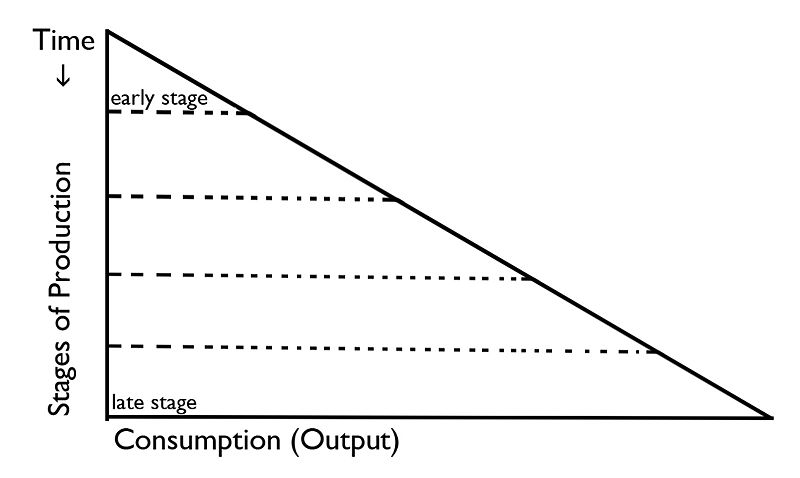
The Hayekian triangle diagram is used to illustrate the roundaboutness of capital structures.

According to ABCT, in a genuinely free market random bankruptcies and business failures will always occur at the margins of an economy, but should not "cluster" unless there is a widespread mispricing problem in the economy that triggers simultaneous and cascading business failures. According to the theory a period of widespread and synchronized "malinvestment" is caused by mis-pricing of interest rates thereby causing a period of widespread and excessive business lending by banks, and this credit expansion is later followed by a sharp contraction and period of distressed asset sales (liquidation) which were purchased with overleveraged debt. The initial expansion is believed to be caused by fractional reserve banking encouraging excessive lending and borrowing at interest rates below what full reserve banks would demand. Due to the availability of relatively inexpensive funds, entrepreneurs invest in capital goods for more roundabout, "longer process of production" technologies such as “high tech” industries. Borrowers take their newly acquired funds and purchase new capital goods, thereby causing an increase in the proportion of aggregate spending allocated to “high tech” capital goods rather than basic consumer goods such as food. However, such a shift is inevitably unsustainable over time due to mispricing caused by excessive credit creation by the banks and must reverse itself eventually as it is always unsustainable. The longer this distorting dislocation continues, the more violent and disruptive will be the necessary re-adjustment process.

Austrian School theorists argue that a boom taking place under these circumstances is actually a period of wasteful malinvestment. "Real" savings would have required higher interest rates to encourage depositors to save their money in term deposits to invest in longer-term projects under a stable money supply. The artificial stimulus caused by bank lending causes a generalized speculative investment bubble which is not justified by the long-term factors of the market.

=== Bust ===
The "crisis" (or "credit crunch") arrives when the consumers come to reestablish their desired allocation of saving and consumption at prevailing interest rates. The "recession" or "depression" is actually the process by which the economy adjusts to the wastes and errors of the monetary boom, and reestablishes efficient service of sustainable consumer desires.

Continually expanding bank credit can keep the artificial credit-fueled boom alive (with the help of successively lower interest rates from the central bank). This postpones the "day of reckoning" and defers the collapse of unsustainably inflated asset prices.

The monetary boom ends when bank credit expansion finally stops, i.e. when no further investments can be found which provide adequate returns for speculative borrowers at prevailing interest rates. The longer the "false" monetary boom goes on, the bigger and more speculative the borrowing, the more wasteful the errors committed and the longer and more severe will be the necessary bankruptcies, foreclosures, and depression readjustment.

=== Government policy error ===
Austrian business cycle theory does not argue that fiscal restraint or "austerity" will necessarily increase economic growth or result in immediate recovery. Rather, they argue that the alternatives (generally involving central government bailing out banks and companies and individuals favoured by the government of the day) will make eventual recovery more difficult and unbalanced. All attempts by central governments to prop up asset prices, bail out insolvent banks, or "stimulate" the economy with deficit spending will only make the misallocations and malinvestments more acute and the economic distortions more pronounced, prolonging the depression and adjustment necessary to return to stable growth, especially if those stimulus measures substantially increase government debt and the long term debt load of the economy. Austrians argue the policy error rests in the government's (and central bank's) weakness or negligence in allowing the "false" unsustainable credit-fueled boom to begin in the first place, not in having it end with fiscal and monetary "austerity". Debt liquidation and debt reduction is therefore the only solution to a debt-fueled problem. The opposite – getting even further into debt to spend the economy's way out of crisis – cannot logically be a solution to a crisis caused by too much debt. More government or private debt solving a debt-related problem is logically impossible.

According to Ludwig von Mises, "[t]here is no means of avoiding the final collapse of a boom brought about by credit expansion. The alternative is only whether the crisis should come sooner as a result of the voluntary abandonment of further credit expansion, or later as a final and total catastrophe of the currency system involved".

== The role of central banks ==
Austrian School theorists generally argue that inherently damaging and ineffective central bank policies, including unsustainable expansion of bank credit through fractional reserve banking, are the predominant cause of most business cycles, as they tend to set artificial interest rates too low for too long, resulting in excessive credit creation, speculative "bubbles", and artificially low savings. Under fiat monetary systems, a central bank creates new money when it lends to member banks, and this money is multiplied many times over through the money creation process of the private banks. This new bank-created money enters the loan market and provides a lower rate of interest than that which would prevail if the money supply were stable.

== History ==
A similar theory appeared in the last few pages of Mises's The Theory of Money and Credit (1912). This early development of Austrian business cycle theory was a direct manifestation of Mises's rejection of the concept of neutral money and emerged as an almost incidental by-product of his exploration of the theory of banking. David Laidler has observed in a chapter on the theory that the origins lie in the ideas of Knut Wicksell.

Friedrich Hayek's presentation of the theory in the 1930s was criticized by many economists, including John Maynard Keynes, Piero Sraffa and Nicholas Kaldor. In 1932, Piero Sraffa argued that Hayek's theory did not explain why "forced savings" induced by inflation would generate investments in capital that were inherently less sustainable than those induced by voluntary savings. Sraffa also argued that Hayek's theory failed to define a single "natural" rate of interest that might prevent a period of growth from leading to a crisis. Others who responded critically to Hayek's work on the business cycle included John Hicks, Frank Knight and Gunnar Myrdal. Hayek reformulated his theory in response to those objections.

Austrian School economist Roger Garrison explains the origins of the theory:

Grounded in the economic theory set out in Carl Menger's Principles of Economics and built on the vision of a capital-using production process developed in Eugen von Böhm-Bawerk's Capital and Interest, the Austrian theory of the business cycle remains sufficiently distinct to justify its national identification. But even in its earliest rendition in Mises's Theory of Money and Credit and in subsequent exposition and extension in F. A. Hayek's Prices and Production, the theory incorporated important elements from Swedish and British economics. Knut Wicksell's Interest and Prices, which showed how prices respond to a discrepancy between the bank rate and the real rate of interest, provided the basis for the Austrian account of the misallocation of capital during the boom. The market process that eventually reveals the intertemporal misallocation and turns boom into bust resembles an analogous process described by the British Currency School, in which international misallocations induced by credit expansion are subsequently eliminated by changes in the terms of trade and hence in specie flow.

Ludwig von Mises and Friedrich Hayek were two of the few economists who gave warning of a major economic crisis before the great crash of 1929. In February 1929, Hayek warned that a coming financial crisis was an unavoidable consequence of reckless monetary expansion.

Austrian School economist Peter J. Boettke argued in the wake of the Great Recession that the Federal Reserve was making a mistake by not allowing consumer prices to fall. According to him, the Fed's policy of reducing interest rates to below-market-level when there was a chance of deflation in the early 2000s together with government policy of subsidizing homeownership resulted in unwanted asset inflation. Financial institutions leveraged up to increase their returns in the environment of below market interest rates. Boettke further argues that government regulation through credit rating agencies enabled financial institutions to act irresponsibly and invest in securities that would perform only if the prices in the housing market continued to rise. However, once the interest rates went back up to the market level, prices in the housing market began to fall and soon afterwards financial crisis ensued. Boettke attributed the failure to policy makers who assumed that they had the necessary knowledge to make positive interventions in the economy. The Austrian School view is that government attempts to influence markets prolong the process of needed adjustment and reallocation of resources to more productive uses. In this view bailouts serve only to distribute wealth to the well-connected, while long-term costs are borne out by the majority of the ill-informed public.

Economist Steve H. Hanke identifies the 2008 financial crisis as the direct outcome of the Federal Reserve Bank's interest rate policies as is predicted by the Austrian business cycle theory. Financial analyst Jerry Tempelman has also argued that the predictive and explanatory power of ABCT in relation to the 2008 financial crisis reaffirmed its status and perhaps cast into question the utility of mainstream theories and critiques.

== Empirical research ==
Empirical economic research findings are inconclusive, with different economic schools of thought arriving at different conclusions. In 1969, Nobel laureate Milton Friedman found the theory to be inconsistent with empirical evidence. Twenty five years later in 1993, he reanalyzed the question using newer data, and reached the same conclusion. However, in 2001, Austrian School economist James P. Keeler argued that the theory is consistent with empirical evidence. Economists Francis Bismans and Christelle Mougeot arrived at the same conclusion in 2009.

According to some economic historians, economies have experienced less severe boom-bust cycles after World War II, because governments have addressed the problem of economic recessions. Many have argued that this has especially been true since the 1980s because central banks were granted more independence and started using monetary policy to stabilize the business cycle, an event known as The Great Moderation. However, Austrian economists argue the opposite, that boom-bust cycles following the creation of the Federal Reserve have been more frequent and more severe than those prior to 1913.

== Reactions of economists and policymakers ==
According to Nicholas Kaldor, Hayek's work on the Austrian business cycle theory had at first "fascinated the academic world of economists" but attempts to fill in the gaps in theory led to the gaps appearing "larger, instead of smaller" until ultimately "one was driven to the conclusion that the basic hypothesis of the theory, that scarcity of capital causes crises, must be wrong".

Lionel Robbins, who had embraced the Austrian theory of the business cycle in The Great Depression (1934), later regretted having written that book and accepted many of the Keynesian counterarguments.

The Nobel Prize Winner Maurice Allais was a proponent of Austrian business cycle theory and their perspective on the Great Depression and often quoted Ludwig Von Mises and Murray N. Rothbard.

When, in 1937, the League of Nations examined the causes of and solutions to business cycles, the Austrian business cycle theory alongside the Keynesian and Marxian theory were the three main theories examined.

== Similar theories ==
The Austrian theory is considered one of the precursors to the modern credit cycle theory, which is emphasized by Post-Keynesian economists, economists at the Bank for International Settlements. These two emphasize asymmetric information and agency problems. Henry George, another precursor, emphasized the negative impact of speculative increases in the value of land, which places a heavy burden of mortgage payments on consumers and companies.

A different theory of credit cycles is the debt-deflation theory of Irving Fisher.

In 2003, Barry Eichengreen laid out a credit boom theory as a cycle in which loans increase as the economy expands, particularly where regulation is weak, and through these loans' money supply increases. However, inflation remains low because of either a pegged exchange rate or a supply shock, and thus the central bank does not tighten credit and money. Increasingly speculative loans are made as diminishing returns lead to reduced yields. Eventually inflation begins or the economy slows, and when asset prices decline, a bubble is pricked which encourages a macroeconomic bust.

In 2006, William White argued that "financial liberalization has increased the likelihood of boom-bust cycles of the Austrian sort" and he has later argued the "near complete dominance of Keynesian economics in the post-world war II era" stifled further debate and research in this area. While White conceded that the status quo policy had been successful in reducing the impacts of busts, he commented that the view on inflation should perhaps be longer term and that the excesses of the time seemed dangerous. In addition, White believes that the Austrian explanation of the business cycle might be relevant once again in an environment of excessively low interest rates. According to the theory, a sustained period of low interest rates and excessive credit creation results in a volatile and unstable imbalance between saving and investment.

== Related policy proposals ==
Economists Jeffrey Herbener, Joseph Salerno, Peter G. Klein and John P. Cochran have testified before Congressional Committee about the beneficial results of moving to either a free banking system or a free full-reserve banking system based on commodity money based on insights from Austrian business cycle theory.

== Criticisms ==
According to John Quiggin, most economists believe that the Austrian business cycle theory is incorrect because of its incompleteness and other problems. Economists such as Gottfried von Haberler and Milton Friedman, Gordon Tullock, Bryan Caplan, and Paul Krugman, have also criticized the theory.

=== Theoretical objections ===
Some economists argue that the Austrian business cycle theory requires bankers and investors to exhibit a kind of irrationality, because their theory requires bankers to be regularly fooled into making unprofitable investments by temporarily low interest rates. In response, historian Thomas Woods argues that few bankers and investors are familiar enough with the Austrian business cycle theory to consistently make sound investment decisions. Austrian School economists Anthony Carilli and Gregory Dempster argue that a banker or firm loses market share if it does not borrow or loan at a magnitude consistent with current interest rates, regardless of whether rates are below their natural levels. Thus businesses are forced to operate as though rates were set appropriately, because the consequence of a single entity deviating would be a loss of business. Austrian School economist Robert Murphy argues that it is difficult for bankers and investors to make sound business choices because they cannot know what the interest rate would be if it were set by the market. Austrian economist Sean Rosenthal argues that widespread knowledge of the Austrian business cycle theory increases the amount of malinvestment during periods of artificially low interest rates.

In a 1998 interview, Milton Friedman expressed dissatisfaction with the policy implications of the theory:

I think the Austrian business-cycle theory has done the world a great deal of harm. If you go back to the 1930s, which is a key point, here you had the Austrians sitting in London, Hayek and Lionel Robbins, and saying you just have to let the bottom drop out of the world. You’ve just got to let it cure itself. You can’t do anything about it. You will only make it worse. You have Rothbard saying it was a great mistake not to let the whole banking system collapse. I think by encouraging that kind of do-nothing policy both in Britain and in the United States, they did harm.

=== Empirical objections ===
Jeffery Rogers Hummel argues that the Austrian explanation of the business cycle fails on empirical grounds. In particular, he notes that investment spending remained positive in all recessions where there are data, except for the Great Depression. He argues that this casts doubt on the notion that recessions are caused by a reallocation of resources from industrial production to consumption, since he argues that the Austrian business cycle theory implies that net investment should be below zero during recessions. In response, Austrian School economist Walter Block argues that the misallocation during booms does not preclude the possibility of demand increasing overall.

In 1969, economist Milton Friedman, after examining the history of business cycles in the U.S., concluded that the Austrian Business Cycle was false. He analyzed the issue using newer data in 1993, and again reached the same conclusion. Austrian economist Jesus Huerta de Soto claims that Friedman has not proven his conclusion because he focuses on the contraction of GDP being as high as the previous contraction, but that the theory "establishes a correlation between credit expansion, microeconomic malinvestment and recession, not between economic expansion and recession, both of which are measured by an aggregate (GDP)" and that the empirical record shows strong correlation.

Referring to Friedman's discussion of the business cycle, Austrian economist Roger Garrison stated that "Friedman's empirical findings are broadly consistent with both Monetarist and Austrian views" and goes on to argue that although Friedman's model "describes the economy's performance at the highest level of aggregation; Austrian theory offers an insightful account of the market process that might underlie those aggregates".

== See also ==
- America's Great Depression by Murray Rothbard
- Criticism of the Federal Reserve
- Jesús Huerta de Soto
- Hayekian triangle
