= List of Auburn, Alabama people =

The following is a list of notable Auburnites, people who have lived or are currently living in Auburn, Alabama. Many on the list lived in the city while students at Auburn University.

== Academics ==
- Donald J. Boudreaux - economist, chairman of George Mason University Department of Economics
- Charles Curran - theologian
- John M. Darby - botanist
- Robert B. Ekelund, Jr. - economist, author
- Francis Ernest Lloyd - botanist
- Olav Kallenberg - mathematician
- Krystyna Kuperberg - mathematician
- Carolina Henriette Mac Gillavry - chemist, crystallographer
- Tibor R. Machan - philosopher, retired from Chapman University in 2014 and past research fellow at the Hoover Institution
- Samuel Mockbee - architect, founder of Auburn's Rural Studio, 2004 AIA Gold Medal
- Mike Reed - computer scientist, director United Nations University International Institute for Software Technology
- Frederick Chapman Robbins - pediatrician, virologist, Nobel Laureate in Medicine, 1956
- Paul Rudolph - architect, chairman of Yale Department of Architecture, 1958-1965
- Joseph T. Salerno - economist
- Mark Thornton - economist
- Thomas E. Woods, Jr. - historian, author of The Politically Incorrect Guide to American History, Meltdown: A Free-Market Look at Why the Stock Market Collapsed, the Economy Tanked, and Government Bailouts Will Make Things Worse and other books

== Art and literature ==
- Ace Atkins - author
- Tim Dorsey - author
- Bill Holbrook - cartoonist, "On The Fast Track", "Save Havens" and "Kevin & Kell"
- Jimmy Johnson - cartoonist, "Arlo and Janis"
- Madison Jones - author
- Bruce Larsen - artist
- Barry Moser - printmaker and illustrator
- Heberto Padilla - Cuban poet
- Lallah Miles Perry - artist
- Anne Rivers Siddons - author
- William Spratling - silversmith and artist, "father of Mexican silver"

== Astronautics ==
- Jan Davis - space shuttle astronaut, STS-47, STS-60
- Hank Hartsfield - space shuttle astronaut, STS-4, STS-41-D, STS-61-A
- Ken Mattingly - astronaut, Apollo 16, STS-4
- Kathryn C. Thornton - space shuttle astronaut, 2nd American woman in space, STS-33, STS-73
- Clifton Williams - astronaut, Project Gemini
- James S. Voss - space shuttle astronaut, STS-44, STS-53, STS-69, STS-101, ISS

== Athletics ==
- Charles Barkley - professional basketball player, All-Star
- Joe Beckwith - professional baseball player
- Brandon Boudreaux, professional Canadian football player
- Terry Bowden - football coach, sports commentator
- James Brooks - professional football player, All-Pro
- Ronnie Brown - professional football player
- Kirsty Coventry - swimmer, gold medalist 2004 Olympics
- Rashaan Evans - NFL linebacker and first-round pick of the Atlanta Falcons
- Al Del Greco - professional football player, radio sports personality
- Vince Dooley - football coach
- Jason Dufner - PGA Professional Golfer & former walk-on at Auburn University
- Rowdy Gaines - swimmer, gold medalist 1984 Olympics, world record holder, and television sports commentator
- Harvey Glance - athlete, gold medalist 1976 Olympics
- Jamie Hampton - professional tennis player
- John Heisman - football coach
- Tim Hudson - professional baseball player, All Star pitcher
- Stephen Huss - tennis player, 2005 Wimbledon Men's Doubles champion
- Bo Jackson - professional football and baseball player, All-Pro, All-Star, Heisman Trophy winner
- Ralph Jordan - football coach
- Bill Kazmaier - powerlifter, three-time World's Strongest Man
- Joanne P. McCallie - basketball coach
- Will Muschamp - Head Coach University of Florida
- Cam Newton - professional football player, Heisman Trophy winner in 2010, national champion
- Frank Sanders - professional football player
- Maurice Smith - decathlete
- Red Smith - professional baseball player, early 20th century
- Takeo Spikes - professional football player
- Pat Sullivan - professional football player, Heisman Trophy winner in 1971, current coach of Samford University
- Frank Thomas - professional baseball player, All-Star
- Tommy Tuberville - football coach and United States senator
- Osi Umenyiora - professional football player, All-Pro
- DeMarcus Ware - professional football player
- Marcus Washington - professional football player, All-Pro
- Joe Whitt Jr. - professional football coach
- Cadillac Williams - professional football player

== Business ==
- Timothy D. Cook – Apple Computer chief executive officer
- Joe Forehand – chairman, Accenture
- Kenneth R. Giddens – long-term director of Voice of America; TV/radio station founder.
- Samuel Ginn – wireless communications pioneer and former chairman, Vodafone, board of directors, Chevron – member of Auburn University's board of trustees
- Charles D. Griffin – president, CarboMedics Inc.
- John M. Harbert – founder and CEO Harbert Corporation 1949-1992
- Elmer Beseler Harris – former CEO Alabama Power
- Joel Hurt – engineer, Atlanta businessman
- Bobby Lowder – chairman and CEO of Colonial BancGroup
- Mark Spencer – president and CEO, Digium, creator of Asterisk PBX
- Alvin Vogtle – president, Southern Company; his escape from Stalag Luft III was portrayed in The Great Escape (1963)

== Entertainment ==
- Hot Rod Circuit - punk rock band
- Jimmy Buffett - entertainer
- Bobby Goldsboro - singer, composer
- Thom Gossom Jr. - actor, author, speaker
- Urbie Green - jazz trombonist
- Taylor Hicks - singer, American Idol winner
- Mitch Holleman - child actor
- Victoria Jackson - comedian
- Man or Astro-man? - surf/punk rock band
- Eliot Morris - singer
- Octavia Spencer - Academy Award winning actress
- Toni Tennille - singer, "The Captain & Tennille"
- Kate Higgins - voice actress, singer, musician

== Military ==
- Lloyd Austin - general, Chief of Staff United States Central Command
- James H. Lane - Confederate general
- James E. Livingston - general, United States Marine Corps, Medal of Honor recipient
- Richard Marcinko - founder SEAL Team SIX, author, talk radio host
- Forrest S. McCartney - Retired Air Force General
- Hal Moore - lieutenant general, portrayed by Mel Gibson in 'We Were Soldiers' (2002)
- Carl Epting Mundy, Jr. - Commandant of the United States Marine Corps, (1991-1995)
- Hugh Shelton - retired general, Chairman of the Joint Chiefs of Staff, 1997-2001
- Holland Smith - general, United States Marine Corps, "father of modern U.S. amphibious warfare"
- Johnny Micheal Spann - CIA agent and first American killed in combat in the U.S. invasion of Afghanistan

== Politics and government ==
- Spencer Bachus - US Representative, 1993–2015
- Jere Beasley - Governor of Alabama, 1972; Lieutenant Governor 1971-1979
- Sidney Johnston Catts - Governor of Florida, 1917-1921
- Lester Crawford - Commissioner of the FDA, 2005
- Robert Gibbs - 27th White House Press Secretary
- George Paul Harrison Jr., Confederate Army General and former U.S. Congressman for the 3rd District of Alabama
- James Thomas Heflin - US Congressman, Representative, 1904-1920; Senator, 1920-1932
- Fob James - Governor of Alabama, 1979-1983, 1995-1999
- John McDuffie - US Representative, 1919-1935, Majority Whip 1931-1933
- Harold Melton - Georgia Supreme Court Justice, 2005–present
- William Hall Milton - US Senator, 1908-1909
- Gordon Persons - Governor of Alabama, 1951-1955
- Wilton Persons - White House Chief of Staff, 1958-1961; major general, U.S. Army
- David Addison Reese - US Representative, 1853-1855
- William J. Samford - Governor of Alabama, 1900-1901
- Joe Turnham - chairman, Alabama Democratic Party
- Pete Turnham - former state representative

== Other ==
- Keith Black - director of neurosurgery, Cedars-Sinai Medical Center
- Lillian Gordy Carter - mother of president Jimmy Carter
- William Chen - poker player, World Series of Poker champion
- Elizabeth Caroline Dowdell - leader of women's patriotic and religious organizations
- Millard Fuller - founder of Habitat for Humanity
- Rheta Grimsley Johnson - syndicated newspaper columnist
- Lewis A. Pick - engineer, US Chief of Engineers 1949-1953
- Lew Rockwell - president of the Mises Institute
- Cynthia Tucker - syndicated columnist, editorial page editor for The Atlanta Journal-Constitution
- Jimmy Wales - co-founder of Wikipedia
- Eric Harshbarger - puzzle designer
