= Criticism of the Federal Reserve =

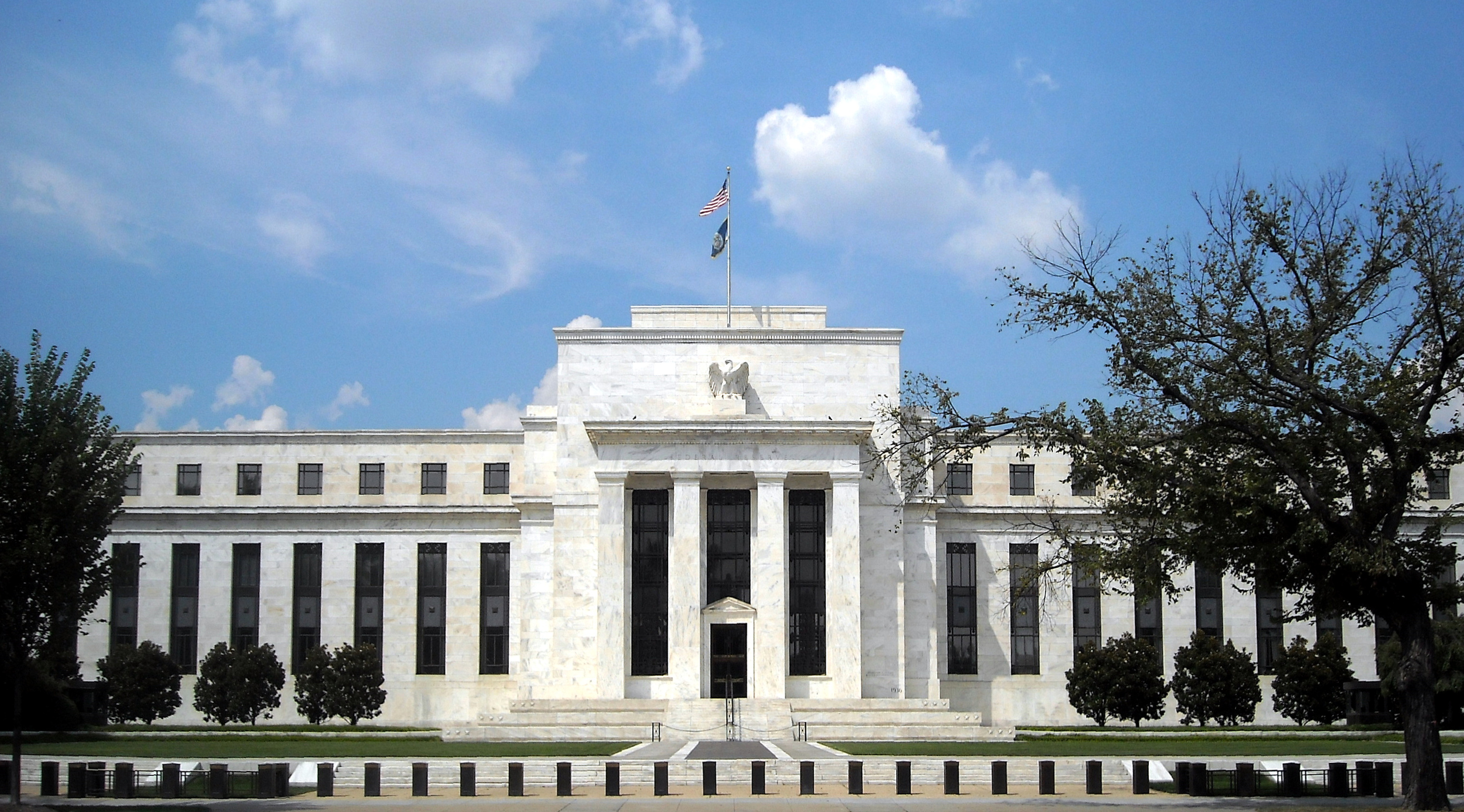
The Eccles Building, headquarters of the Federal Reserve

The Federal Reserve System, commonly known as "the Fed", has faced various criticisms since its establishment in 1913. Critics have questioned its effectiveness in managing inflation, regulating the banking system, and stabilizing the economy. Notable critics include Nobel laureate economist Milton Friedman and his fellow monetarist Anna Schwartz, who argued that the Fed's policies exacerbated the Great Depression. Libertarian figures such as Ron Paul and Rand Paul have called for greater transparency and accountability, with Ron Paul advocating for the Fed's abolition and a return to a gold standard.

Critics have also raised concerns about the Fed's role in fractional reserve banking, its contribution to economic cycles, and its transparency. Expansionary policies, such as lowering interest rates and increasing the money supply, have been blamed for creating asset bubbles, inflation, and other economic distortions. The Fed has been accused of causing economic downturns, including the 2008 financial crisis, and of being influenced by private interests. Its response to that crisis, particularly the bailing out of large financial institutions, has drawn criticism for creating moral hazard and disproportionately benefiting Wall Street at the expense of ordinary citizens. Despite these criticisms, the Federal Reserve remains a central institution in the United States' financial system, with ongoing debates about its role, policies, and the need for reform.

== Creation ==
An early version of the Federal Reserve Act was drafted in 1910 on Jekyll Island, Georgia, by Republican Senator Nelson Aldrich, chairman of the National Monetary Commission, and several Wall Street bankers. The final version, with provisions intended to improve public oversight and weaken the influence of the New York banking establishment, was drafted by Democratic Congressman Carter Glass of Virginia. The structure of the Fed was a compromise between the desire of the bankers for a central bank under their control and the desire of President Woodrow Wilson to create a decentralized structure under public control. The Federal Reserve Act was approved by Congress and signed by President Wilson in December 1913.

Economist Hans Sennholz called the Fed's creation, "the most tragic blunder ever committed by Congress. The day it was passed, old America died and a new era began. A new institution was born that was to cause, or greatly contribute to, the unprecedented economic instability in the decades to come."

== Inflation policy ==
In The Case Against the Fed, Murray Rothbard argued in 1994 that, although a supposed core function of the Federal Reserve is to maintain a low level of inflation, its policies (like those of other central banks) have actually aggravated inflation. This occurs when the Fed creates too much fiat money backed by nothing. He called the Fed policy of money creation "legalized counterfeiting" and favored a return to the gold standard. He wrote:

[I]t is undeniable that, ever since the Fed was visited upon us in 1914, our inflations have been more intense, and our depressions far deeper, than ever before. There is only one way to eliminate chronic inflation, as well as the booms and busts brought by that system of inflationary credit: and that is to eliminate the counterfeiting that constitutes and creates that inflation. And the only way to do that is to abolish legalized counterfeiting: that is, to abolish the Federal Reserve System, and return to the gold standard, to a monetary system where a market-produced metal, such as gold, serves as the standard money, and not paper tickets printed by the Federal Reserve.

The Federal Reserve has been criticized as not meeting its goals of greater stability and low inflation. This has led to a number of proposed changes including advocacy of different policy rules or dramatic restructuring of the system itself.

Milton Friedman concluded that governments do have a role in the monetary system, he was critical of the Federal Reserve due to its poor performance and felt it should be abolished. Friedman believed that the Federal Reserve System should ultimately be replaced with a computer program. He favored a system that would automatically buy and sell securities in response to changes in the money supply. This proposal has become known as Friedman's k-percent rule.

Others have proposed NGDP targeting as an alternative rule to guide and improve central bank policy. Prominent supporters include Scott Sumner, David Beckworth, and Tyler Cowen.

== Congress ==
Several members of Congress have criticized the Fed. Senator Robert Owen, whose name was on the Glass-Owen Federal Reserve Act, believed that the Fed was not performing as promised. He said:

The Federal Reserve Board was created to control, regulate and stabilize credit in the interest of all people. . . . The Federal Reserve Board is the most gigantic financial power in all the world. Instead of using this great power as the Federal Reserve Act intended that it should, the board . . . delegated this power to the banks.

Representative Louis T. McFadden, Chairman of the House Committee on Banking and Currency from 1920 to 1931, accused the Federal Reserve of deliberately causing the Great Depression. In several speeches made shortly after he lost the chairmanship of the committee, McFadden claimed that the Federal Reserve was run by Wall Street banks and their affiliated European banking houses. In one 1932 House speech (that has been criticized as bluster), he stated:

Mr. Chairman, we have in this country one of the most corrupt Institutions the world has ever known. I refer to the Federal Reserve Board and the Federal Reserve banks; . . . This evil institution has impoverished and ruined the people of the United States . . . through the corrupt practices of the moneyed vultures who control it.

Many members of Congress who have been involved in the House and Senate Banking and Currency Committees have been open critics of the Federal Reserve, including Chairmen Wright Patman, Henry Reuss, and Henry B. Gonzalez. Representative Ron Paul, Chairman of the Monetary Policy Subcommittee in 2011, is known as a staunch opponent of the Federal Reserve System. He routinely introduced bills to abolish the Federal Reserve System, three of which gained approval in the House but lost in the Senate.

Congressman Paul also introduced H.R. 459: Federal Reserve Transparency Act of 2011, This act required an audit of the Federal Reserve Board and the twelve regional banks, with particular attention to the valuation of its securities. His son, Senator Rand Paul, has introduced similar legislation in subsequent sessions of Congress.

== Great Depression (1929) ==
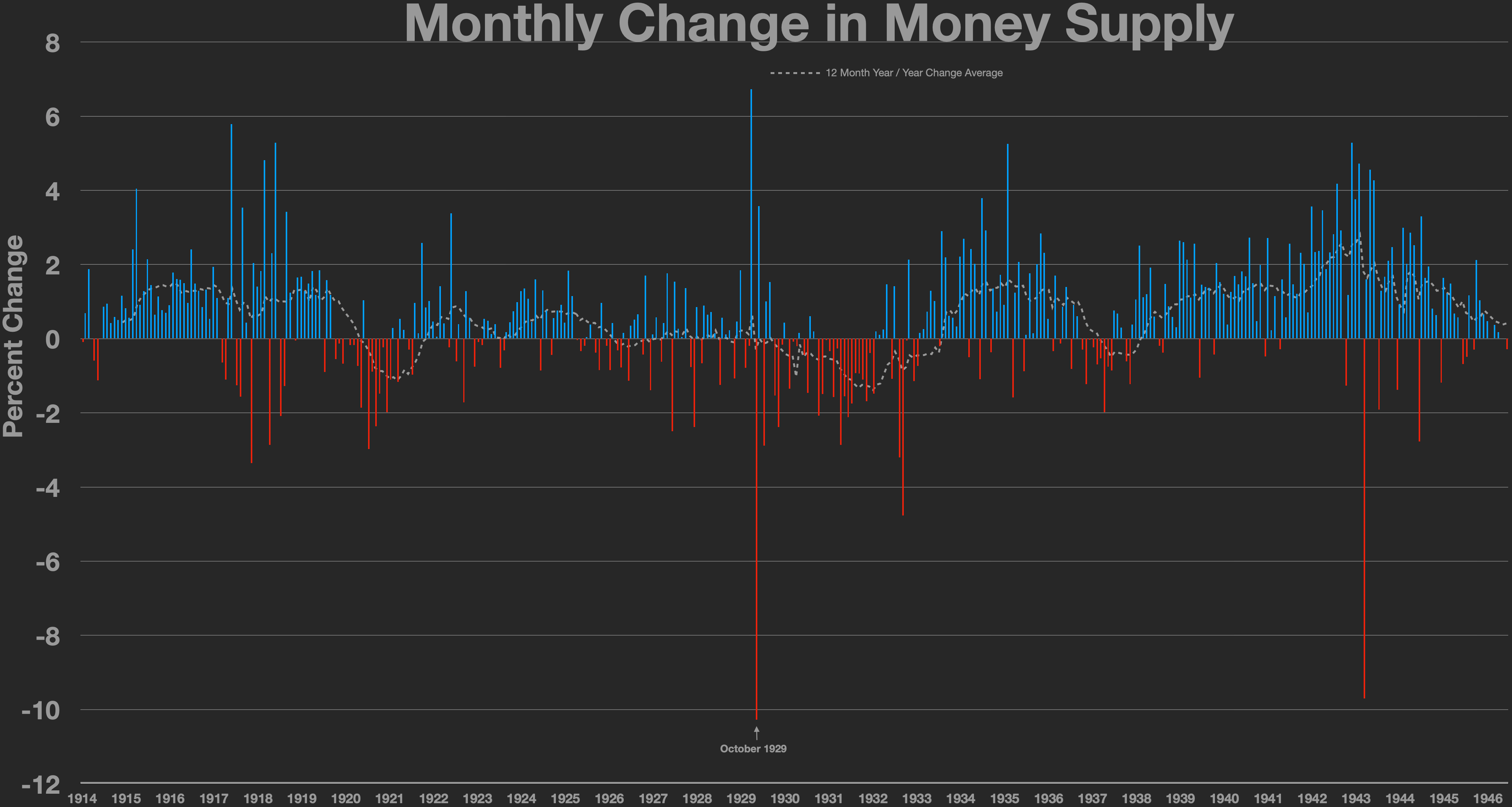
Total money supply contracted -10.28% in October 1929 and continued to contract for the next few years during Herbert Hoover's presidency

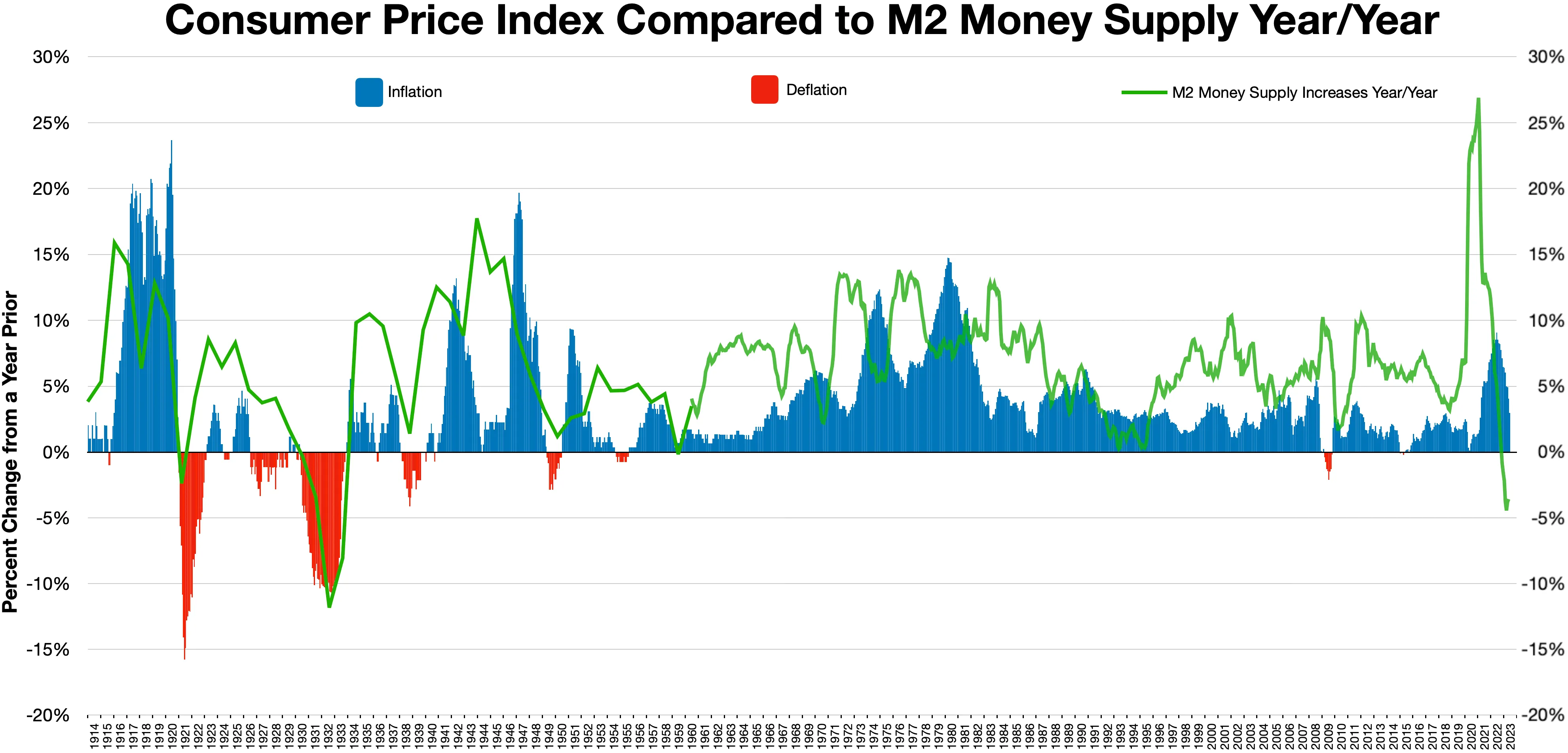
Inflation Deflation M2 money supply increases Year/Year

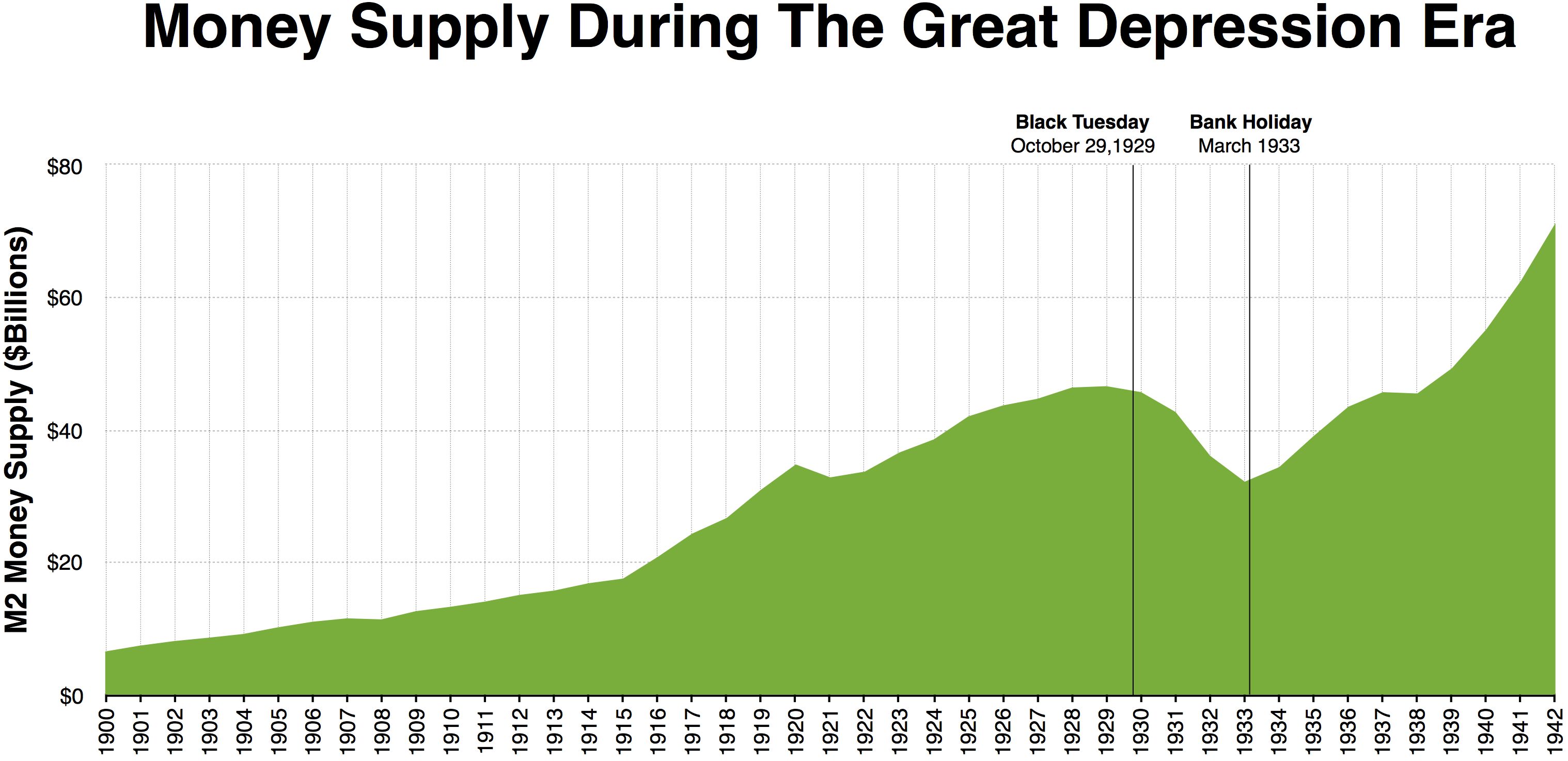
Money supply decreased significantly between Black Tuesday and the Bank Holiday in March 1933 when there were massive bank runs across the United States

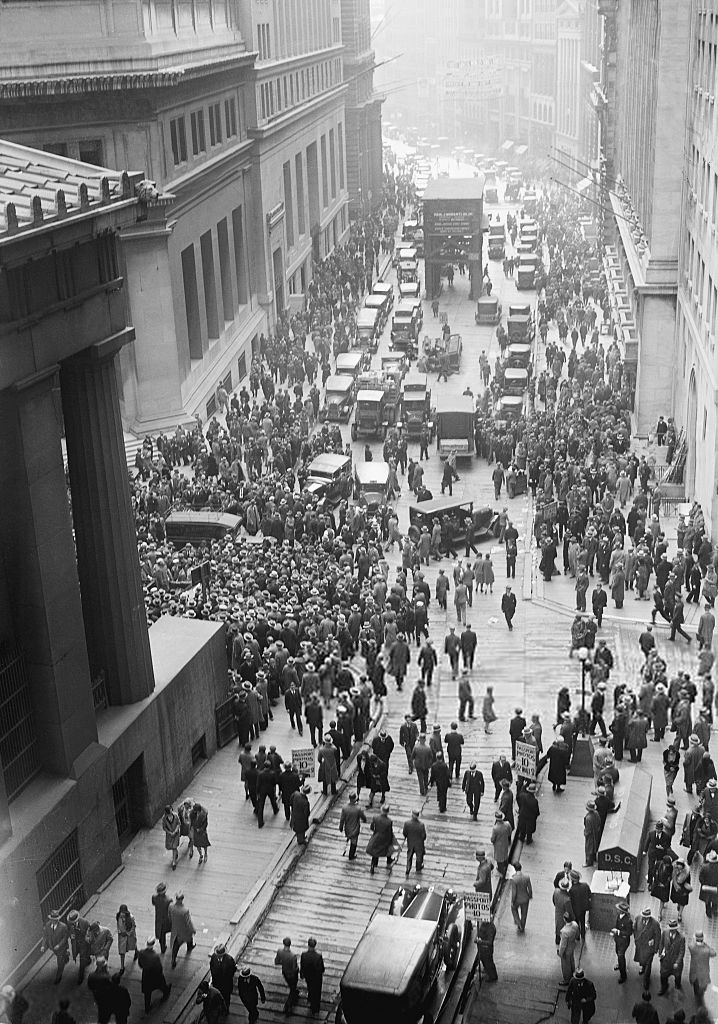
Crowd gathering on Wall Street after the 1929 crash.

Milton Friedman and Anna Schwartz stated that the Fed pursued an erroneously restrictive monetary policy, exacerbating the Great Depression. After the stock market crash in 1929, the Fed continued its contraction (decrease) of the money supply and refused to save banks that were struggling with bank runs. This mistake, critics charge, allowed what might have been a relatively mild recession to explode into catastrophe. Friedman and Schwartz believed that the depression was "a tragic testimonial to the importance of monetary forces." Before the establishment of the Federal Reserve, the banking system had dealt with periodic crises (such as in the Panic of 1907) by suspending the convertibility of deposits into currency. In 1907, the system nearly collapsed and there was an extraordinary intervention by an ad-hoc coalition assembled by J. P. Morgan. In the years 1910–1913, the bankers demanded a central bank to address this structural weakness. Friedman suggested that a similar intervention should have been followed during the banking panic at the end of 1930. This might have stopped the vicious circle of forced liquidation of assets at depressed prices, just as suspension of convertibility in 1893 and 1907 had quickly ended the liquidity crises at the time.

Essentially, in the monetarist view, the Great Depression was caused by the fall of the money supply. Friedman and Schwartz note that "[f]rom the cyclical peak in August 1929 to a cyclical trough in March 1933, the stock of money fell by over a third." The result was what Friedman calls "The Great Contraction"—a period of falling income, prices, and employment caused by the choking effects of a restricted money supply. The mechanism suggested by Friedman and Schwartz was that people wanted to hold more money than the Federal Reserve was supplying. People thus hoarded money by consuming less. This, in turn, caused a contraction in employment and production, since prices were not flexible enough to immediately fall. Friedman and Schwartz argued the Federal Reserve allowed the money supply to plummet because of ineptitude and poor leadership.

Many have since agreed with this theory, including Ben Bernanke, Chairman of the Federal Reserve from 2006 until 2014, who, in a speech honoring Friedman and Schwartz, said:

Let me end my talk by abusing slightly my status as an official representative of the Federal Reserve. I would like to say to Milton and Anna: Regarding the Great Depression, you're right. We did it. We're very sorry. But thanks to you, we won't do it again.

Friedman has said that ideally he would prefer to "abolish the Federal Reserve and replace it with a computer." He preferred a system that would increase the money supply at some fixed rate, and he thought that "leaving monetary and banking arrangements to the market would have produced a more satisfactory outcome than was actually achieved through government involvement".

In contrast to Friedman's argument that the Fed did too little to ease after the crisis, Murray Rothbard argued that the crisis was caused by the Fed being too loose in the 1920s in the book America's Great Depression.

== 2008 financial crisis ==
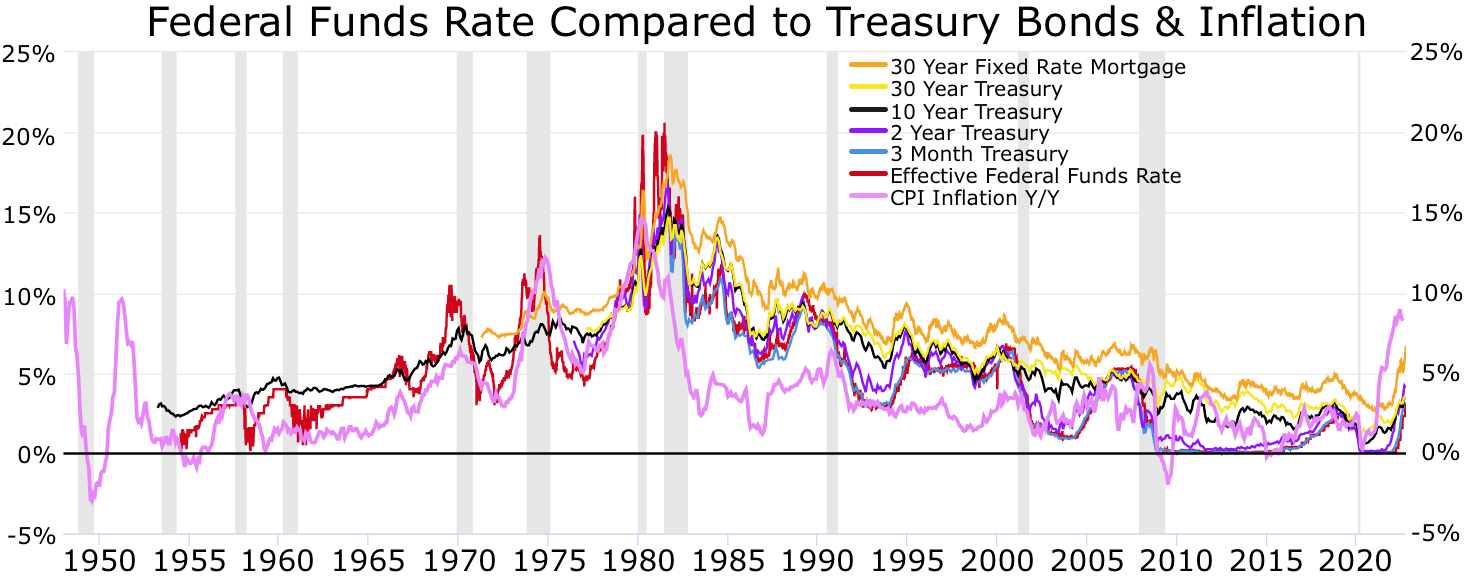
30 year mortgage average 30 Year Treasury Bond 10 Year Treasury Bond 2 Year Treasury Bond 3 month Treasury Bond Effective Federal Funds Rate CPI inflation year/year Recessions

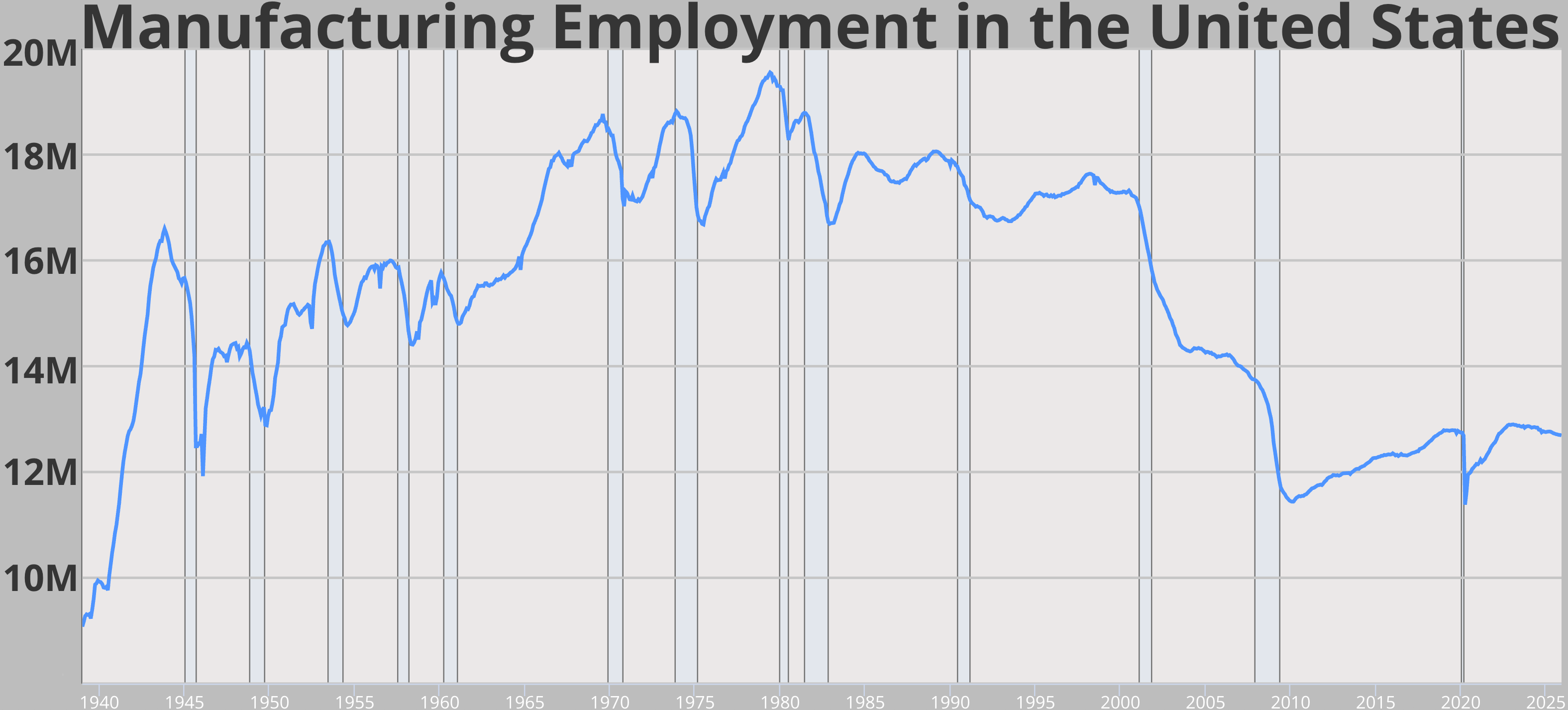
Recessions cause contractions in manufacturing employment, from a lack of demand.

Some economists, such as John B. Taylor, have asserted that the Fed was responsible, at least partially, for the United States housing bubble which occurred prior to the 2007 recession. They claim that the Fed kept interest rates too low following the 2001 recession. The housing bubble then led to the credit crunch. Other economists associated with the Austrian School of economics, including former U.S. Congressman Ron Paul and historian Tom Woods, have argued that the artificially low interest rates allowed for speculative investments and unsustainable levels of debt, particularly in housing. In Tom Woods' book Meltdown, Woods contends that Federal Reserve manipulation of the money supply and credit markets distorted normal price signals, leading to widespread malinvestment, resulting in an inevitable correction. Then-Chairman Alan Greenspan disputes this interpretation. He points out that the Fed's control over the long-term interest rates (to which critics refer) is only indirect. The Fed did raise the short-term interest rate over which it has control (i.e., the federal funds rate), but the long-term interest rate (which usually follows the former) did not increase.

Paul and Woods also criticized Fannie Mae's and Freddie Mac's role in the crisis, asserting that the entities engaged in excessive risk-taking by expanding homeownership beyond sustainable levels. In doing this, the government intervention created moral hazard by assuring large financial institutions that they would receive government support in times of crisis, which Paul and Woods believe encouraged riskier behavior.

The Federal Reserve's role as a supervisor and regulator has been criticized as being ineffective. Former U.S. Senator Chris Dodd, then-chairman of the United States Senate Committee on Banking, Housing, and Urban Affairs, remarked about the Fed's role in the 2007-2008 economic crisis, "We saw over the last number of years when they took on consumer protection responsibilities and the regulation of bank holding companies, it was an abysmal failure."

== COVID-19 pandemic ==
During COVID-19 pandemic, the Federal Reserve's policies such as rapidly growing the M2, increasing its bank reserves, quantitative easing (QE), and keeping interest rates near zero until March 2022 had been criticised by economists, especially monetarists, as greatly contributing to the inflation spike which peaked at 9.1%, a record high in over 40 years.

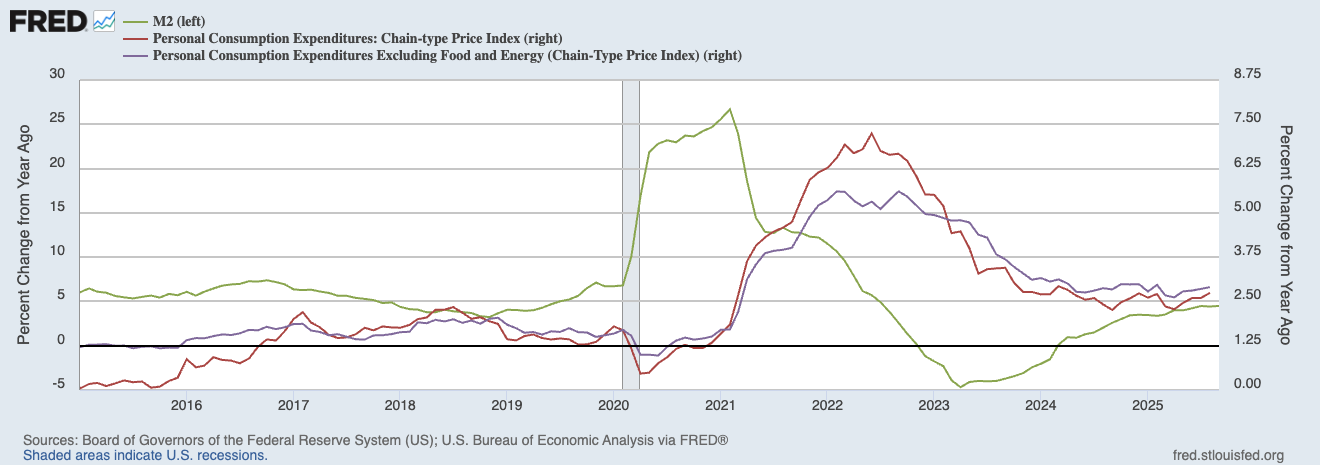
The historically high jump in M2 was a big factor in causing inflation during the presidency of Joe Biden

== Money creation ==
The Federal Reserve does not actually control the money supply directly and has delegated this authority to banks, banks are the primary source of money creation through loans. If a bank has a reserve requirement of 10% and they have 10 million dollars in bank deposits, they can create 100 million dollars to loan out to borrowers. It is essentially going on margin 10:1 without having to pay interest on the margin, because it is in effect money that they created themselves. According to this critique, this is the primary cause of credit cycles or business cycles, because money supply creation is not under any single entity's control and is decentralized among many banks that are trying to maximize profits individually. The Federal Reserve indirectly controls this process by manipulating the Federal Funds Rate that sets the tone for interest rates on new debt throughout the economy, and intentionally puts the economy into a recession (hard landing) or slow the economy without a recession (soft landing) to tame inflation.

== Republican and Tea Party criticism ==
During several recent elections, the Tea Party movement has made the Federal Reserve a major point of attack, which has been picked up by Republican candidates across the country. Former Congressman Ron Paul (R) of Texas and his son Senator Rand Paul (R) of Kentucky have long attacked the Fed, arguing that it is hurting the economy by devaluing the dollar. They argue that its monetary policies cause booms and busts when the Fed creates too much or too little fiat money. Ron Paul's book End the Fed repeatedly points out that the Fed engages in money creation "out of thin air." He argued that interest rates should be set by market forces, not by the Federal Reserve. Paul argues that the booms, bubbles and busts of the business cycle are caused by the Federal Reserve's actions.

In the book, Paul argues that "the government and its banking cartel have together stolen $0.95 of every dollar as they have pursued a relentlessly inflationary policy." David Andolfatto of the Federal Reserve Bank of St. Louis said the statement was "just plain false" and "stupid" while noting that legitimate arguments can be made against the Federal Reserve. University of Oregon economist Mark Thoma described it as an "absurd" statement which data does not support.

Surveys of economists show overwhelming opposition to abolishing the Federal Reserve or undermining its independence. According to Princeton University economist Alan S. Blinder, "mountains of empirical evidence support the proposition that greater central bank independence produces not only less inflation but superior macroeconomic performance, e.g., lower and less volatile inflation with no more volatility in output."

Ron Paul's criticism has stemmed from the influence of the Austrian School of Economics. More specifically, economist Murray Rothbard was a vital figure in developing his views. Rothbard attempted to intertwine both political and economic arguments together in order to make a case to abolish the Federal Reserve. When first laying out his critiques, he writes "The Federal Reserve System is accountable to no one; it has no budget; it is subject to no audit; and no Congressional committee knows of...its operations." This argument from Rothbard is outdated, however, as the Federal Reserve presently does report its balance sheet weekly as well as get audited by outside third parties.

Rothbard also heavily critiques the Federal Reserve being independent from politics despite the Federal Reserve being given both private and public qualities. The acknowledgment of the Federal Reserve being a part of government that exists outside of politics inevitably becomes a "self-perpetuating oligarchy, accountable to no one." This ignores the fact that the Federal Reserve Board of Governors is a federal agency, appointed by the president and Senate.

== Money supply should be controlled by Congress ==
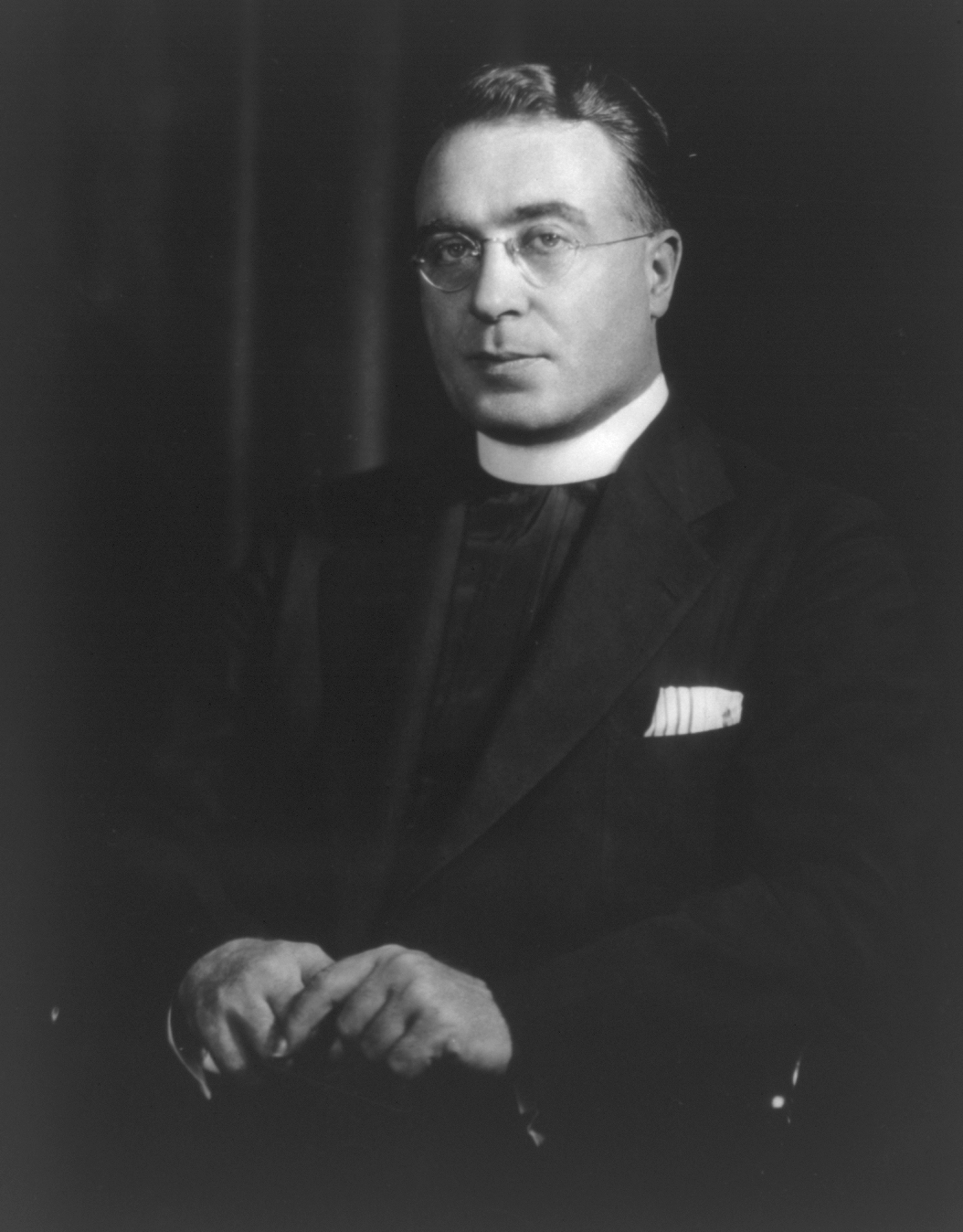
Father Charles Coughlin

In the 1930s, Charles Coughlin called on Congress to take back control of the money supply, as it is given authority under Article I, Section 8, in the Enumerated Powers, to coin money and regulate the value thereof.

"There is written in the Constitution of the United States that Congress has the right to coin, issue, and regulate the value of money."

— Father Charles Coughlin

== Private ownership or control ==
According to the Congressional Research Service:

Because the regional Federal Reserve Banks are privately owned, and most of their directors are chosen by their stockholders, it is common to hear assertions that control of the Fed is in the hands of an elite. In particular, it has been rumored that control is in the hands of a very few people holding "class A stock" in the Fed.

As explained, there is no stock in the system, only in each regional Bank. More important, individuals do not own stock in Federal Reserve Banks. The stock is held only by banks who are members of the system. Each bank holds stock proportionate to its capital. Ownership and membership are synonymous. Moreover, there is no such thing as "class A" stock. All stock is the same.

This stock, furthermore, does not carry with it the normal rights and privileges of ownership. Most significantly, member banks, in voting for the directors of the Federal Reserve Banks of which they are a member, do not get voting rights in proportion to the stock they hold. Instead, each member bank regardless of size gets one vote. Concentration of ownership of Federal Reserve Bank stock, therefore, is irrelevant to the issue of control of the system (italics in original).

According to the web site for the Federal Reserve System, the individual Federal Reserve Banks "are the operating arms of the central banking system, and they combine both public and private elements in their makeup and organization." Each of the 12 Banks has a nine-member board of directors: three elected by the commercial banks in the Bank's region, and six chosen – three each by the member banks and the Board of Governors – "to represent the public with due consideration to the interests of agriculture, commerce, industry, services, labor and consumers." These regional banks are in turn controlled by the Federal Reserve Board of Governors, whose seven members are nominated by the president of the United States and confirmed by the Senate.

Member banks ("about 38 percent of the nation's more than 8,000 banks") are required to own capital stock in their regional banks. Until 2016, the regional banks paid a set 6% dividend on the member banks' paid-in capital stock (not the regional banks' profits) each year, returning the rest to the US Treasury Department. As of February 24, 2016, member banks with more than $10 billion in assets receive an annual dividend on their paid-in capital stock (Reserve Bank stock) of the lesser of 6% percent and the highest yield of the 10-year Treasury note auctioned at the last auction held prior to the payment of the dividend. Member banks with $10 billion or less in assets continue to be paid a set 6% annual dividend. This change was implemented during the Obama administration in order "to implement the provisions of section 32203 of the Fixing America's Surface Transportation Act (FAST Act)". The Fed has noted that this has created "some confusion about 'ownership'":

[Although] the Reserve Banks issue shares of stock to member banks...owning Reserve Bank stock is quite different from owning stock in a private company. The Reserve Banks are not operated for profit, and ownership of a certain amount of stock is, by law, a condition of membership in the System. The stock may not be sold, traded, or pledged as security for a loan….

In his textbook, Monetary Policy and the Financial System, Paul M. Horvitz, the former Director of Research for the Federal Deposit Insurance Corporation, stated,

...the member banks can exert some rights of ownership by electing some members of the Board of Directors of the Federal Reserve Bank [applicable to those member banks]. For all practical purposes, however, member bank ownership of the Federal Reserve System is merely a fiction. The Federal Reserve Banks are not operated for the purpose of earning profits for their stockholders. The Federal Reserve System does earn a profit in the normal course of its operations, but these profits, above the 6% statutory dividend, do not belong to the member banks. All net earnings after expenses and dividends are paid to the Treasury.

In the American Political Science Review, Michael D. Reagan wrote,

...the "ownership" of the Reserve Banks by the commercial banks is symbolic; they do not exercise the proprietary control associated with the concept of ownership nor share, beyond the statutory dividend, in Reserve Bank "profits." ...Bank ownership and election at the base are therefore devoid of substantive significance, despite the superficial appearance of private bank control that the formal arrangement creates.

== Transparency issues ==
One critique is that the Federal Open Market Committee, which is part of the Federal Reserve System, lacks transparency and is not sufficiently audited. A report by Bloomberg News asserts that the majority of Americans believes that the System should be held more accountable or that it should be abolished. Another critique is the contention that the public should have a right to know what goes on in the Federal Open Market Committee (FOMC) meetings.

== See also ==
- America's Great Depression
- Black Friday (1869) – American gold panic Covers the gold scandal of 1869
- The Case Against the Fed
- Causes of the Great Depression
- Criticism of the United States government § Criticism of agencies
- Dedollarisation – Replacing US dollar for other currencies
- End the Fed
- Federal Reserve Police – Law enforcement unit of the U.S. Federal Reserve
- Fractional reserve banking – Banking system where institutions hold only a fraction of deposits as reserves
- Free banking – Economic system
- Gold standard – Monetary system based on the value of gold
- Great Contraction – Early years of the Great Depression
- Murray Rothbard – American economist (1926–1995)
