= Bruce Larson =

Bruce Larson could refer to:

- Bruce Larson (basketball) (1926-2021), American basketball coach
- Bruce Larson (racing driver) (born 1937), American drag racer

== See also ==
- Bruce Larsen, American sculptor
