= Kevin Gutzman =

American constitutional scholar and historian

Kevin R. C. Gutzman
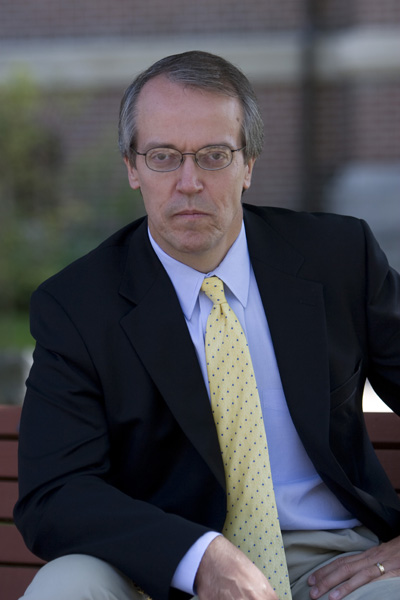
- Born: May 20, 1963 (age 63); United States
- Education: University of Texas (BA, MPA, JD); University of Virginia (MA, PhD)
- Scientific career
- Fields: American history, Constitutional Studies, Politics
- Workplaces: Western Connecticut State University

Kevin R. Constantine Gutzman (/ˈɡʌtsmən/; born May 20, 1963) is an American constitutional scholar and historian. He is Professor of History at Western Connecticut State University.

== Biography ==
Gutzman holds a B.A. from the University of Texas (1985); a J.D. from the University of Texas School of Law (1990), a Master of Public Affairs from the LBJ School of Public Affairs, University of Texas (1990), and an M.A. (1994) and the PhD (1999) in history from the University of Virginia.

In addition to scholarly articles, Gutzman has written scholarly books including, Virginia’s American Revolution: From Dominion to Republic, 1776-1840 in which he argues that it was the intense commitment of politically active Virginians that led them not only to break away from Britain, but to then produce the first state constitution based on a bill of rights. He further argued that the Virginians who ratified the United States Constitution in 1788 understood it as a revocable agreement entered into by 13 sovereign states.

Gutzman's works for a popular audience include The Politically Incorrect Guide to the Constitution, which was named one of the "Top Ten Conservative Books of 2007" by Human Events, and Who Killed the Constitution?

== Books ==
- The Politically Incorrect Guide to the Constitution (Washington, DC: Regenery Publishing, 2007).
- Virginia’s American Revolution: From Dominion to Republic, 1776-1840 (Maryland: Lexington Books, 2007)
- Who Killed the Constitution? The Federal Government vs. American Liberty from World War I to Barack Obama, co-authored with Thomas Woods (New York: Crown Forum, 2008)
- James Madison and the Making of America (New York: St. Martin's Press, 2012)
- Thomas Jefferson - Revolutionary: A Radical's Struggle to Remake America (New York: St. Martin's Press, 2015)
- The Jeffersonians: The Visionary Presidencies of Jefferson, Madison, and Monroe (New York: St. Martin's Press, 2022)
