= Latin Mass Magazine =

American catholic quarterly periodical

Latin Mass Magazine

The Latin Mass: A Journal of Catholic Culture, commonly referred to as Latin Mass Magazine, is an American Catholic magazine published quarterly, with a traditionalist Catholic viewpoint. It is based in Ramsey, New Jersey.

== History and profile ==
Latin Mass Magazine was established in 1992. Published by the Catholic organization Keep the Faith, the magazine is a strong supporter of the traditional Tridentine Mass. It has often expressed skepticism about the liturgical and other reforms introduced by the Second Vatican Council and Popes John XXIII and Paul VI. The magazine advocates for traditional gender roles and complementarism. The magazine admires Pope Benedict XVI because of his emphasis on traditional Catholic dogma and apparent desire to widen the use of the Tridentine Mass in the church.

The magazine claims to be "one of the fastest growing Catholic periodicals in the country." In a 2006 interview with The Wanderer, a Catholic weekly newspaper, former publisher Roger McCaffrey claimed: "In 10 years, the circulation of Latin Mass Magazine will be higher than that of [Jesuit Magazine] America."

According to its mission statement, the magazine attempts to combat what it sees as "accelerating secularism" by emphasizing a "return of the Church to tradition and authentic organic development". The magazine also holds conferences to encourage conservative priests and laity in furthering a more traditional approach to Catholic teaching and liturgy, and it hopes to establish a study center "that will assist the articulation of Catholic tradition".

Tom Woods had been managing editor starting in 1996. The magazine's most recent managing editor was John W. Blewett, who died February 8, 2013.

The publication has seen occasional controversy, such as its dispute with The Wanderer over Humanae Vitae, Paul VI's encyclical on birth control.
