= Meltdown (Woods book) =

2009 non-fiction book by Thomas Woods

Meltdown A Free-Market Look at Why the Stock Market Collapsed, the Economy Tanked, and the Government Bailout Will Make Things Worse
- Hardcover edition
- Author: Tom Woods (foreword by Rep. Ron Paul)
- Language: English
- Genre: Finance
- Publisher: Regnery Publishing
- Publication date: February 9, 2009
- Publication place: United States
- Media type: Print (hardback & paperback)
- Pages: 194
- ISBN: 1-596-98587-9

Meltdown: A Free-Market Look at Why the Stock Market Collapsed, the Economy Tanked, and the Government Bailout Will Make Things Worse is a book on the 2008 financial crisis by historian Tom Woods, with a foreword by Ron Paul. The book was published on February 9, 2009 by Regnery Publishing.

== Overview ==
Woods is a follower of the Austrian school of economics and believes in allowing the market to freely compete in currency, which he believes would lead to mostly to implementation of the gold standard. The book is dedicated to Murray Rothbard and Ron Paul. The book debuted at #16 on the "Hardcover, non-fiction" New York Times Best Seller list, and advanced to the #11 spot in its second week on the list. According to the author's official website, Meltdown was on the NYT Best Seller list for 10 weeks.

Woods' thesis maintains that: deflation of prices neither causes nor prolongs depressions; deflation may be necessary to prevent depressions or to bring depressions to an end; the Federal Reserve is the primary cause of business cycles (in Austrian Business Cycle Theory) via its arbitrary and coercive control of the money supply; and trying to cure these credit cycles with more government intervention will not work.

Woods argues that government intervention in the form of support for housing and excessive monetary expansion caused the current crisis. By creating an illusion of wealth (that certain resources exist which do not exist), interventions encourage wasteful investments and unsustainable consumption, instead of productive investments. The proposed cures (bailouts, more money creation, and stimulus spending) will just make matters worse. No business is really too big to fail, he says, even large financial institutions. For them, as for other businesses, liquidation is preferable to a bailout from the perspective of the larger economy.

According to Woods, the depressions of the 19th century were caused by banks (various state banks and the Second Bank of the United States) issuing paper money, supposedly convertible to gold, in amounts greatly exceeding their gold reserves.

== See also ==
- Great Recession in the United States
- The Politically Incorrect Guide to American History
