= The Case Against the Fed =

1994 book by Murray Rothbard

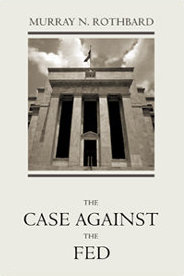
- Author: Murray N. Rothbard
- Language: English
- Subject: Money, Banking
- Publisher: Ludwig von Mises Institute
- Publication date: 1994
- Publication place: United States
- Media type: Paperback
- Pages: 158
- ISBN: 978-0-945466-17-8
- OCLC: 32938131
- Dewey Decimal: 332.1/1/0973 21
- LC Class: HG2565 .R67 1994

The Case Against the Fed is a 1994 book by Murray N. Rothbard criticising the United States Federal Reserve, fractional reserve banking, and central banks in general. It details a history of fractional reserve banking and the influence that bankers have had on monetary policy over the last few centuries.

Rothbard argues that the claim that the Federal Reserve is designed to fight inflation is sophistry, that price inflation is caused only by an increase in the money supply, and that since only banks increase the money supply, then banks, including the Federal Reserve, are the only source of inflation. He writes: "Unlike the days of the gold standard, it is impossible for the Federal Reserve to go bankrupt; it holds the legal monopoly of counterfeiting (of creating money out of thin air) in the entire country. . . . Neat trick if you can get away with it!"

== Publishing history ==
=== In English ===
- The Case Against the Fed. Alabama: Mises Institute, 1994; ISBN 978-0-945466-17-8

=== In Portuguese ===
- Pelo fim do Banco Central. Rio de Janeiro: Editora Konkin, 2022;

== See also ==
- Austrian Business Cycle Theory
