= Tom Woods =

American academic (born 1972)

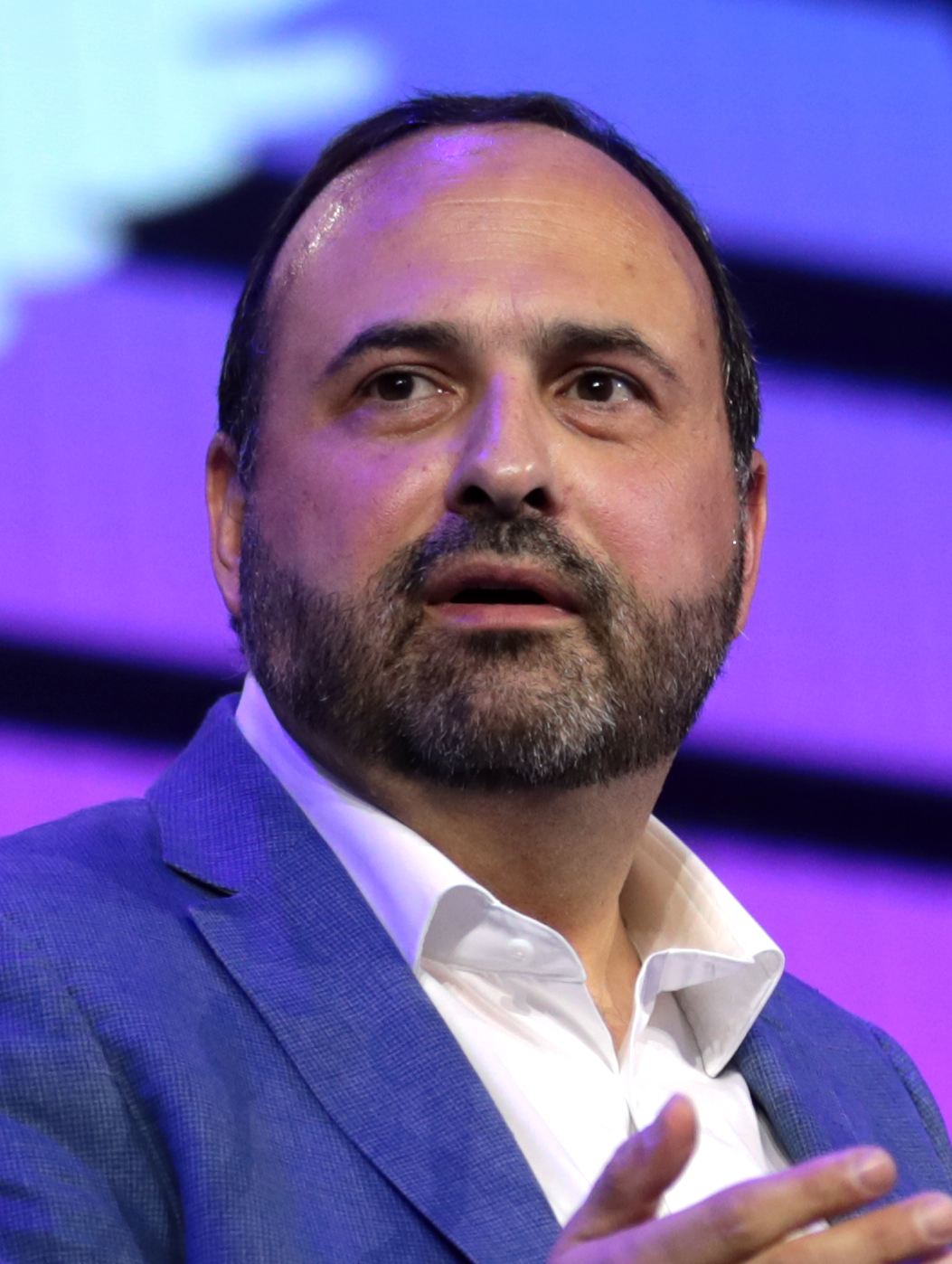
- Woods in February 2021
- Born: Thomas Ernest Woods Jr. August 1, 1972 (age 54); Melrose, Massachusetts, US
- Spouse: Jenna Woods (m. 2022)

Academic background
- Education: Harvard University (BA); Columbia University (MPhil, PhD)
- Thesis: Ever ancient, ever new: Catholic intellectuals and the Progressive Era (2000)
- Doctoral advisor: Alan Brinkley
- Influences: Aquinas · Rothbard · Hoppe

Academic work
- Discipline: History
- Sub-discipline: History of the Catholic Church
- School or tradition: Austrian School
- Website: tomwoods.com

Thomas Ernest Woods Jr. (born August 1, 1972) is an American author, podcast host, and libertarian commentator who is currently a senior fellow at the Mises Institute. A proponent of the Austrian School of economics, Woods hosts a podcast, The Tom Woods Show, and formerly co-hosted the weekly podcast Contra Krugman.

Woods's The Politically Incorrect Guide to American History in 2004 interpreted U.S. history through a paleoconservative and, as described by some writers, pro-Confederate lens. This, and his 2009 book Meltdown on the 2008 financial crisis, became New York Times bestsellers. His subsequent writing has focused on promoting libertarianism and libertarian leaning political figures such as former Congressman and presidential candidate Ron Paul. Woods also teaches homeschooling courses on Western civilization and government called The Liberty Homeschooler as part of the Ron Paul Curriculum.

== Education ==
Woods holds a BA from Harvard (1994) and an MPhil and PhD from Columbia (2000), all in history. His thesis became The Church Confronts Modernity: Catholic Intellectuals and the Progressive Era, which he says "has nothing to do with libertarianism."

== Career and views ==
Woods is a senior fellow of the Mises Institute and is on the editorial board for the institute's Libertarian Papers. He was a founding member of the League of the South (see § Affiliation with League of the South, which he has since denounced. Woods was a Richard M. Weaver Fellow at the Intercollegiate Studies Institute in 1995 and 1996. In August 2020, Woods joined the advisory board of the Mises Caucus political action committee where he continues advising as of April 10, 2022.

Woods is the author of 20 books. Two of his books, Politically Incorrect Guide to American History and Meltdown were on The New York Times Best Seller list in 2005 and 2009, respectively. At the time he wrote Politically Incorrect Guide to American History, he was teaching at Suffolk County Community College on Long Island, New York.

Woods's articles have appeared in publications including The American Historical Review, The Christian Science Monitor, Investor's Business Daily, Modern Age, American Studies, Journal of Markets & Morality, New Oxford Review, The Freeman, The Independent Review, Journal des Économistes et des Études Humaines, AD2000, Crisis, Human Rights Review, Catholic Historical Review, the Catholic Social Science Review, The Latin Mass: A Journal of Catholic Culture, and The American Conservative.

Woods is a Rothbardian libertarian and anarcho-capitalist.

=== Libertarianism ===
Tom Woods subscribes to the libertarian strain of thought known as the Rothbardian or anarcho-capitalist worldview which asserts that individual rights, property rights, peace, the free market, and the nonaggression principle are paramount and that collectivism, violence, and coercion should be opposed. Like some anarcho-capitalists, Woods has stated that his anarchism is philosophical in nature, rather than practical; pragmatically, Woods has referred to himself as a "pragmatic minarchist" and Jeffersonian democrat. Woods's view of libertarianism emphasizes the importance of agorism (a belief that is popular with many left-libertarians), alternative currencies (such as cryptocurrency and precious metals), and political activism to reduce state power.

=== U.S. Constitution ===
Woods co-authored Who Killed the Constitution? with Kevin Gutzman, Professor of History at Western Connecticut State University. Woods and Gutzman criticize what they view as unconstitutional political overreach spanning from World War I to the Obama administration. Woods has promoted the views of Lysander Spooner, who argued that the Constitution holds no authority because the public has not explicitly consented to it and because the Federal Government in his view has not followed its obligations and limits.

Woods advocates the compact theory and promotes the legal theory of nullification, which, he has said, was espoused by Thomas Jefferson and James Madison in the Kentucky and Virginia Resolutions. In his book Nullification, he details the history of and justification for nullification and its adoption by various political movements including abolitionists, slave holders, and those opposed to tariffs. He goes on to suggest nullification as a tool that states can use to check the powers of the federal government. As such, Woods is a supporter of the Tenth Amendment Center, which aims to resist what it views as federal overreach through state action.

Woods views the Bill of Rights as a limitation solely on federal power, and not on the power of the states. In an article for the Southern Partisan magazine in 1997 Woods writes: "The Bill of Rights, moreover, erroneously invoked by modern Civil Libertarians, was never intended to protect individuals from the state governments. Jefferson is far from alone in insisting that only the federal government is restricted from regulating the press, church-state relations, and so forth. The states may do as they wish in these areas."

=== Conservatism ===
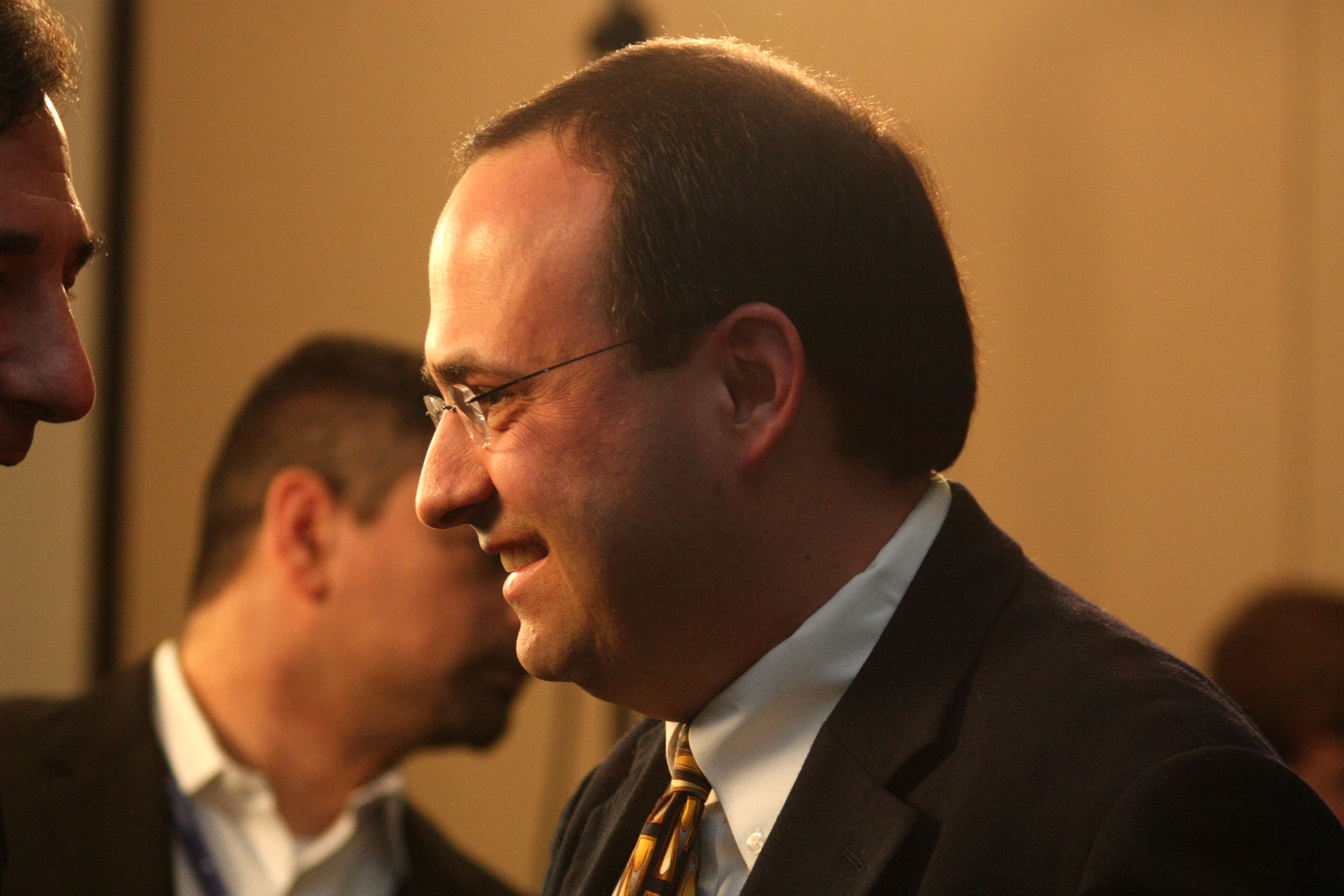
Woods at CPAC in February 2010

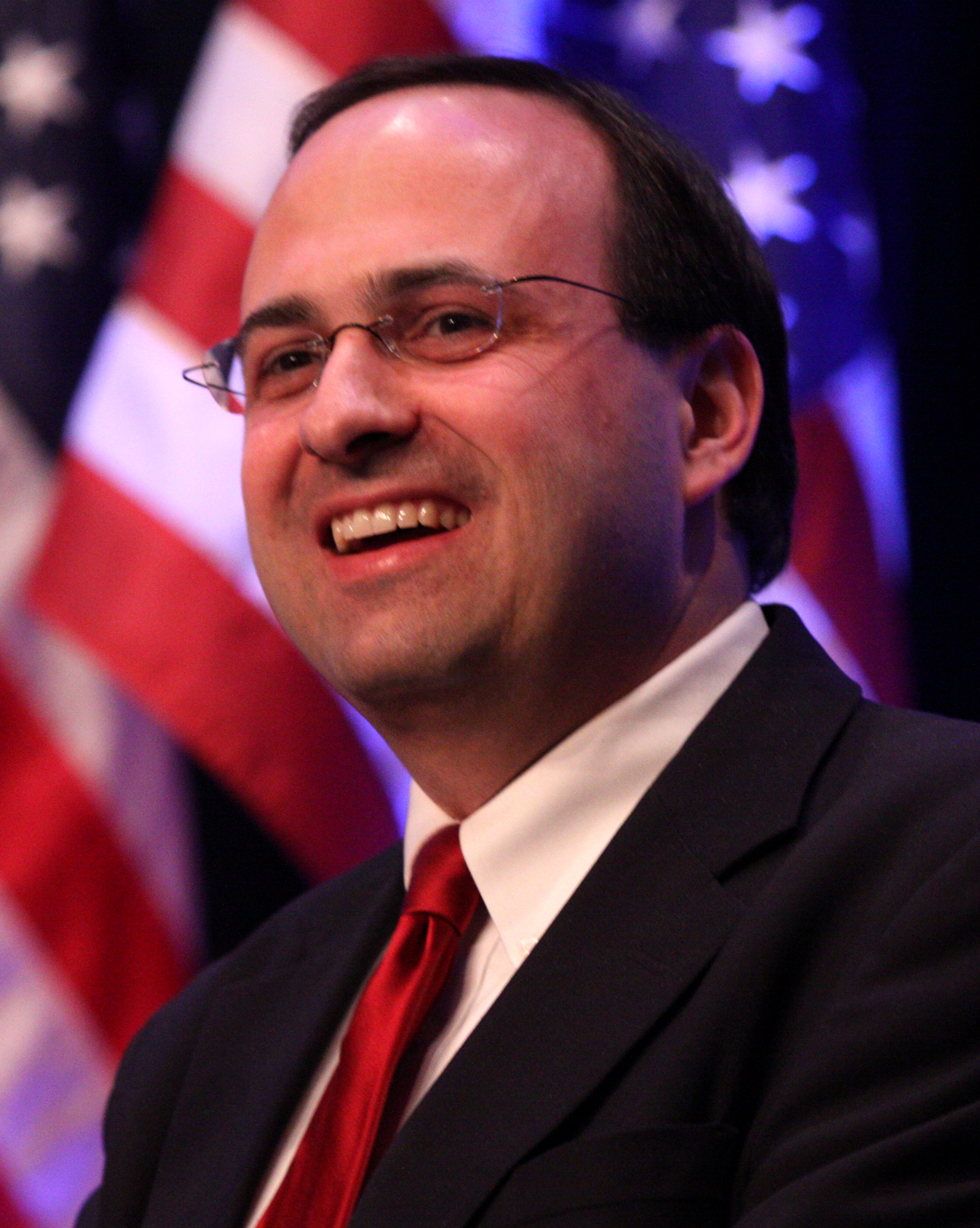
Woods in 2011

In a 2011 interview, Woods said that he entered Harvard as a "middle-of-the-road Republican, the very thing that drives me most berserk today" and then later became a "fully-fledged libertarian". He has criticized those he deems neoconservative and previously identified himself as traditional conservative.

Woods's Politically Incorrect Guide to American History has been described as having neo-Confederate themes; in it, "Woods contends that slavery was benign", according to the book Neo-Confederacy: A Critical Introduction. It was scathingly reviewed by commentator Max Boot of The Weekly Standard. Boot accused Woods of being overly sympathetic with Southerners such as John C. Calhoun and their belief in a state's right to secede and in state nullification, while exaggerating the militarism of Franklin D. Roosevelt, Harry S. Truman, and Bill Clinton. Woods responded by criticizing Boot as an embodiment of "everything that is wrong with modern conservatism." Historian David Greenberg dismissed the book as "a brisk tour of U.S. history from Colonial to Clintonian times, filtered through a lens of far-right dogma, circa 1939" that is "incorrect in more than just its politics" and that "would be tedious to debunk." Judge James Haley, by contrast, praised the book in the conservative Weekly Standard as "a compelling rebuttal to the liberal sentiment encrusted upon current history texts."

==== Immigration policy views ====
In a 1995 The Freeman article, Woods has argued that open-border immigration policies are incompatible with libertarian property-rights theory, contending that unrestricted immigration can infringe on homeowners' property rights.

=== Economics ===
Woods has been an advocate of hard money, and is critical of the Federal Reserve and other central banks which he views as responsible for unnatural inflation and the business cycle. Economist Steven Horwitz has pointed out that Woods's monetary theory and definitions of inflation and deflation rely on a Rothbardian 100% reserve requirement, which is not the only perspective in the Austrian School.

Woods believes that the gender pay gap results because "women often intend to leave the labor force for extended periods of time in order to have children, they do not consider certain high-paying fields where their knowledge would be obsolete after so long an absence."

Woods has been highly critical of Keynesian economics. Woods co-hosted the Contra Krugman podcast (from September 2015 to June 2020) with economist Robert P. Murphy, which critiqued Nobel Prize winning New Keynesian economist Paul Krugman's Times columns through the lens of free market Austrian economics and said it taught economics "by uncovering and dissecting the errors of Krugman."

=== Affiliation with League of the South ===
In 1994, Woods was a founding member of the League of the South, for which he has been criticized. Woods has argued that the League has changed its politics and was not racist or antisemitic in 1994. A 2005 article in Reason Magazine called out Woods for his background in the neo-Confederate organization, stating his views meant he was not a libertarian. The author also noted his frequent writing in the group's magazine, The Southern Patriot, up through 1997 and received a quote from Woods stating that he didn't disagree with most of the views he made in said publications. An article in the same year by a member of the League of the South published in The American Conservative praised Woods's background in the group, his book, and the views expressed within, especially those concerning the Confederacy and how its defeat was the "defining moment when the United States took its steps towards the abyss of the monstrous centralised state, rootless society and decadent culture that we have today."

In 2013, an article by the non-profit Political Research Associates, which studies right-wing white supremacist and extremist groups, noted that Woods was a frequent speaker at neo-Confederate events throughout the 1990s and since then, along with contributing to the American Secession Project started in 2000. The authors noted that a 1997 article written by Woods in the neo-confederate Southern Partisan magazine had him include in the author byline that he was a "founding member of the League of the South." An article from 2014 in Alan Keyes' Renew America organization criticized Woods for his "secessionist libertarianism" and his ongoing involvement with members of "the white supremacist League of the South", though pointed out that it was likely he was naive in his viewpoints, but not racist.

Woods contended in 2018 that the League was founded as a "decentralist" organization and then later took a "dramatic" and "vicious" turn toward racism and anti-semitism. Woods argued: "To show that the organization has undergone a dramatic change, I don't exactly need to hire a private detective. The League’s president himself wrote of having made a 'conscious change' to the League, such that 'we have radicalized by openly and directly addressing the Negro Question and the Jew Question.' Here is express admission of what was already obvious to anyone of good will: this is not the League Jeffrey Tucker and I joined in 1994. Anyone who says otherwise has no idea what he’s talking about. This in fact is why all the PhDs present at the League’s founding, including one of the world’s top David Hume scholars, by all accounts, are long gone – as even the Southern Poverty Law Center now concedes." In an interview with Reason TV's Matt Welch, Woods stated, "Anyone who knows or listens to me, knows I would not be involved with anything sinister. The problem is I will not apologize because the group I joined were a bunch of nerdy academics like me and there was nothing wrong with that group. I could save myself an enormous amount of grief if I would apologize but I will not apologize for this because I am sick and tired of cowards who give in to this type of pressure."

=== COVID-19 ===
During the COVID-19 pandemic, Woods criticized public health measures intended to reduce the spread of COVID-19, including social distancing, masking, and mandatory lockdowns, questioning their effectiveness. In his November 7, 2020 speech entitled Dangers of the Covid Cult, Health Feedback reviewed his claims and characterized several of them as misleading; Woods disputed this assessment. YouTube later removed the Mises Institute's upload of the video, citing violations of its medical misinformation policies. On April 6, 2022, Woods called for "a full-blown book-length demolition of what public health has been up to for the past half century."

== The Tom Woods Show ==
Woods conducts interviews on economic topics, foreign policy, and history in his podcast, The Tom Woods Show, since September 2013.

== Awards ==
Woods received the 2019 Hayek Lifetime Achievement Award from the Austrian Economics Center in Vienna and awards from the Independent Institute and the Institute for Humane Studies at George Mason University. Between 1995 and 2005, he was awarded $8,000 from the Earhart Foundation. His book The Church and the Market: A Catholic Defense of the Free Economy (2005) won the $50,000 first prize in the 2006 Templeton Enterprise Awards.

== Personal life ==
Woods is a traditionalist Roman Catholic. In 2002, he married his first wife Heather, a daughter of his coworker, with whom he had two daughters. In 2020 he announced his engagement to Jenna Laino, and the two were married in 2022.

== Bibliography ==
=== As author ===
- The Great Façade: Vatican II and the Regime of Novelty in the Catholic Church (co-authored with Christopher Ferrara; 2002) ISBN 1-890740-10-1
- The Church Confronts Modernity: Catholic Intellectuals and the Progressive Era (2004) ISBN 0-231-13186-0
- The Politically Incorrect Guide to American History (2004) ISBN 0-89526-047-6
- The Church and the Market: A Catholic Defense of the Free Economy (2005) ISBN 0-7391-1036-5
- How the Catholic Church Built Western Civilization (2005) ISBN 0-89526-038-7
- 33 Questions About American History You're Not Supposed to Ask (2007) ISBN 0-307-34668-4
- Sacred Then and Sacred Now: The Return of the Old Latin Mass (2007) ISBN 978-0-9793540-2-1
- Who Killed the Constitution?: The Fate of American Liberty from World War I to George W. Bush (co-authored with Kevin Gutzman; 2008) (ISBN 978-0-307-40575-3)
- Beyond Distributism (2008), Acton Institute. ISBN 1-880-59529-X ASIN B0082EL802
- Meltdown: A Free-Market Look at Why the Stock Market Collapsed, the Economy Tanked, and Government Bailouts Will Make Things Worse (February 2009) (ISBN 1-5969-8587-9, 978-1-5969-8587-2)
- Nullification: How to Resist Federal Tyranny in the 21st Century (2010) ISBN 1-59698-149-0
- Rollback: Repealing Big Government Before the Coming Fiscal Collapse (2011) ISBN 1-59698-141-5
- Real Dissent: A Libertarian Sets Fire to the Index Card of Allowable Opinion (2014) ISBN 1-50084-476-4
- several free eBooks
- "Diary of a Psychosis: How Public Health Disgraced Itself During COVID Mania" (2023) ISBN 9798988403166

=== As editor ===
- Choate, Rufus (2002). The Political Writings of Rufus Choate. Gateway Editions. ISBN 0-89526-154-5.
- Brownson, Orestes (2003) [1865]. The American Republic. Gateway Editions. ISBN 0-89526-072-7.
- Rothbard, Murray (2007). The Betrayal of the American Right. Ludwig von Mises Institute. ISBN 978-1-933550-13-8.
- We Who Dared to Say No to War: American Antiwar Writing from 1812 to Now. Basic Books. 2008. ISBN 978-1-56858-385-3. (Co-edited with Murray Polner.)
- Back on the Road to Serfdom: The Resurgence of Statism. Intercollegiate Studies Institute. 2010. ISBN 978-1-935191-90-2.
