= Bruce Larsen =

American sculptor

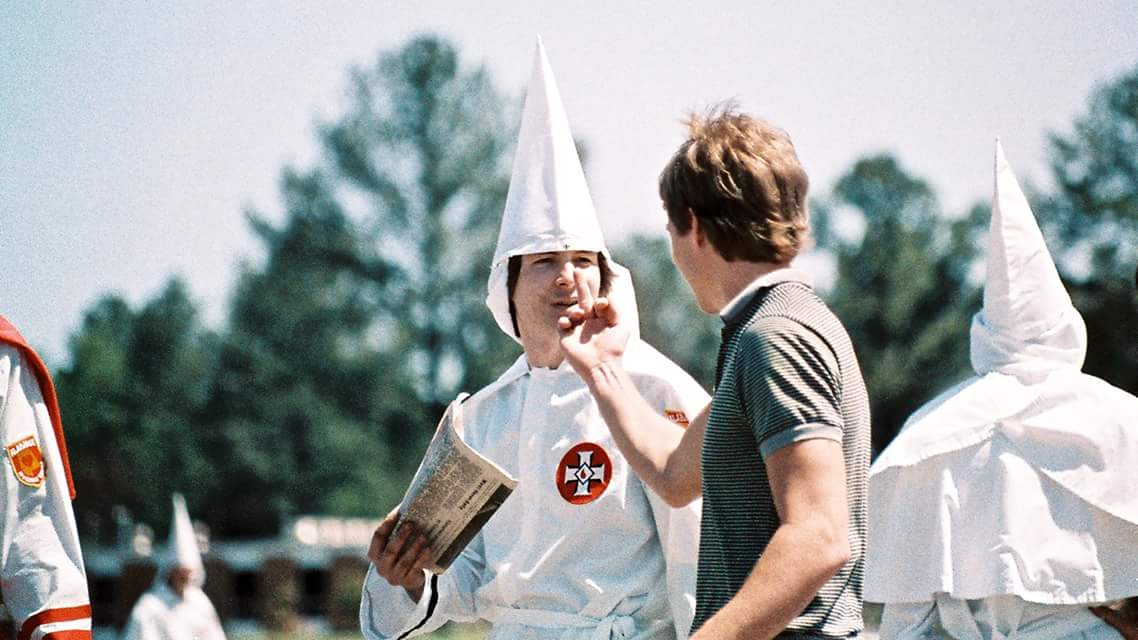
- Larsen (foreground) confronting a Ku Klux Klan member at an Alabama rally in 1986.
- Born: Birmingham, Alabama, U.S.
- Education: Auburn University (1987)
- Known for: Sculpture
- Notable work: Iron Bowl Monument (2009); Nastia (2012)
- Website: brucelarsenart.com

Bruce Larsen is an American fine art sculptor and special effect artist. He is best known for his sculptures depicting animals and famous athletes, made from recycled objects.

== Early life and education ==
Larsen's father was a professor of forestry and wildlife at Auburn University. As a child he would glue together small sculptures made of rocks for his mother. He studied industrial design at Auburn University for a year before moving to New Jersey to work as an airbrush artist painting surfboards. In 1983 he returned to Auburn University and graduated in 1987 with a degree in illustration.

== Fine art ==
Larsen's work has been labeled Repo-Renaissance by the American Sport Art Museum and Archives. A derivative of the Found Object movement, Repo-Renaissance "combines the highly developed technical skills of classical artists in portraying the grace and power of natural bodies with contemporary social attitudes and ecological awareness."

Larsen's first solo exhibit was at the Mobile Museum of Art in December 2007. Titled "A Bruce Larsen Christmas", the exhibit was reviewed by the Press-Register as "Think of it as the view beneath Santa's snow beard. David Lynch meets Tim Burton, with a hint of Charles M. Schulz. Dark and edgy, yet playful." A costume contest was held during the show's opening; a small original sculpture by Larsen the prize.

In 2008 Larsen was chosen by the Alabama State Arts Council to be part of a cultural exchange between Alabama and Italy. Larsen and fellow Alabama artist Charlie Lucas traveled to the city of Pietrasanta for two weeks, where they created artwork from local materials they found for an exhibit housed in the church of Sant'Agostino.

In 2009 Larsen was named the Sport Artist of the Year by the United States Sports Academy. The Academy is home to large sculptures by Larsen, depicting sports scenes and famous athletes including Mark Spitz, Nastia Liukin, and Valeriy Borzov. In recent years Larsen has worked with the non-profit organization Riverkeeper, creating their annual Big Fish award, given to individuals and companies committed to environmental protection. In 2011 he began working with the Hangout Music Festival, who use his artwork each year to decorate around the festival and backstage.

== Film ==
Larsen is known for his work in film creating animatronic animals and creatures, primarily horses. He has also created numerous movie props, such as the knife in Rage, and the mirror in Oculus.

Inspired by the film Alien, Larsen began creating his own monster costumes in college, winning a pound of gold at a Halloween costume contest for a costume made out of duct tape. After graduating from Auburn University he worked as an animator and prop fabricator for television commercials in Atlanta.

Pursuing his original interest in building monsters he then worked on several small budget films, including Basket Case 3, creating special effects and small animatronics. In 2004 he spent 3 months in Kazakhstan building a mechanical horse for the historical epic Nomad, the Warrior.

In 2013 he designed and created the monster for Mike Flanagan's Before I Wake.

== Personal life ==
Larsen lives in Fairhope, Alabama, with his wife and their three children.
