= The Politically Incorrect Guide to American History =

2004 book by Thomas E. Woods

- Author: Thomas E. Woods
- Language: English
- Series: The Politically Incorrect Guide
- Publisher: Regnery Publishing
- Publication date: December 2004
- Publication place: United States
- Media type: Hardback & Paperback
- Pages: 270
- ISBN: 978-0895260475

The Politically Incorrect Guide to American History is a work of paleoconservative literature covering various issues in U.S. history by Thomas E. Woods, published in December 2004. This book was the first in the Politically Incorrect Guide series published by Regnery Publishing, who view the series as covering topics without consideration for political correctness. The book was present on The New York Times best-seller list for many weeks.

== Background and contents ==
The book challenges modern notions of American history; the author argues, among other viewpoints, that America's founding fathers were conservatives, the War on Poverty made poverty worse and that hundreds of American liberals had ties to the Soviet Union during the McCarthy Era. It also contests the cost-effectiveness of government projects, especially the Transcontinental Railroad.

Various writers have noted pro-Confederate themes in the book. It is described in the book Neo-Confederacy as a "neo-Confederate text" that says slavery was benign. Woods acknowledges Clyde N. Wilson and Donald Livingston as having helped to develop his book.

The book also discusses American foreign policy, and notably claims that the death toll of the Kosovo War was smaller than 2,500.

== Reception ==
The book was promoted on Fox News, and was listed on the New York Times Best Seller list for non-fiction books, reaching 8th place in January 2005.

In an editorial in the Times that month, Adam Cohen said "it is tempting to dismiss the book as fringe scholarship, not worth worrying about, but the numbers say otherwise." Cohen described the book as "a checklist of arch-conservative talking points" which opposed civil rights and promoted discredited theories such as nullification.

Council on Foreign Relations senior fellow Max Boot published a critique of the book in The Weekly Standard in February 2005. Boot labeled Woods' pro-secessionist views as a "Bizarro world". Boot also criticized Woods for what he saw as ignoring African Americans' struggle for civil rights and ignoring the fact that Clinton's intervention in the Balkans stopped a potential genocide.

Also in February, libertarian columnist Cathy Young agreed with some of the book's views of free-market economics, but harshly criticized Woods' handling of the topic of slavery: "Unfortunately, whatever solid arguments this book has can only be tainted by association with Woods's ultra-reactionary extremism."

Historian David Greenberg in March dismissed Woods as a "hitherto unknown assistant professor" and his book as "a brisk tour of U.S. history from Colonial to Clintonian times, filtered through a lens of far-right dogma, circa 1939" that is "incorrect in more than just its politics" and that "would be tedious to debunk."

Law professor Eric L. Muller has been frequently cited as a critic of the book, linking its views to the neo-Confederate organization the League of the South. Woods was one of the founding members of the League of the South.

Judge James Haley praised the book in the conservative Weekly Standard as "a compelling rebuttal to the liberal sentiment encrusted upon current history texts."
