= Immigration =

Movement of people into another country or region to which they are not native

Net migration rates per 1,000 people in 2023. On net people travel from redder countries to bluer countries.

Net migration total numbers

Immigration is the international movement of people to a destination country of which they are not usual residents or where they do not possess nationality in order to settle as permanent residents. Commuters, tourists, and other short-term stays in a destination country do not fall under the definition of immigration or migration—though an individual could overstay a travel visa and become an immigrant or permanent resident—seasonal labour is sometimes included in the definition of immigration.

Economically, research suggests that migration can be beneficial both to the receiving and sending countries. The academic literature provides mixed findings for the relationship between immigration and crime worldwide. Research shows that country of origin matters for speed and depth of immigrant assimilation, but that there is considerable assimilation overall for both first- and second-generation immigrants.

Discrimination based on nationality is legal in most countries. Extensive evidence of discrimination against foreign-born persons in criminal justice, business, the economy, housing, health care, media, and politics has been found.

== History ==
The term immigration was coined in the 17th century, referring to non-warlike population movements between the emerging nation states. When people cross national borders during their migration, they are called migrants or immigrants from the perspective of the destination country. In contrast, from the perspective of the country from which they leave, they are called emigrants or outmigrants.

Human migration is the movement by people from one place to another, particularly different countries, with the intention of settling temporarily or permanently in the new location. It typically involves movements over long distances and from one country or region to another. The number of people involved in every wave of immigration differs depending on the specific circumstances.

Historically, early human migration includes the peopling of the world, i.e. migration to world regions where there was previously no human habitation, during the Upper Paleolithic. Since the Neolithic, most migrations (except for the peopling of remote regions such as the Arctic or the Pacific), were predominantly warlike, consisting of conquest or Landnahme on the part of expanding populations. Colonialism involves expansion of sedentary populations into previously only sparsely settled territories or territories with no permanent settlements. In the modern period, human migration has primarily taken the form of migration within and between existing sovereign states, either controlled (legal immigration) or uncontrolled and in violation of immigration laws (illegal immigration).

Migration can be voluntary or involuntary. Involuntary migration includes forced displacement (in various forms such as deportation, the slave trade, flight (war refugees and ethnic cleansing), all of which could result in the creation of diasporas.

== Statistics ==
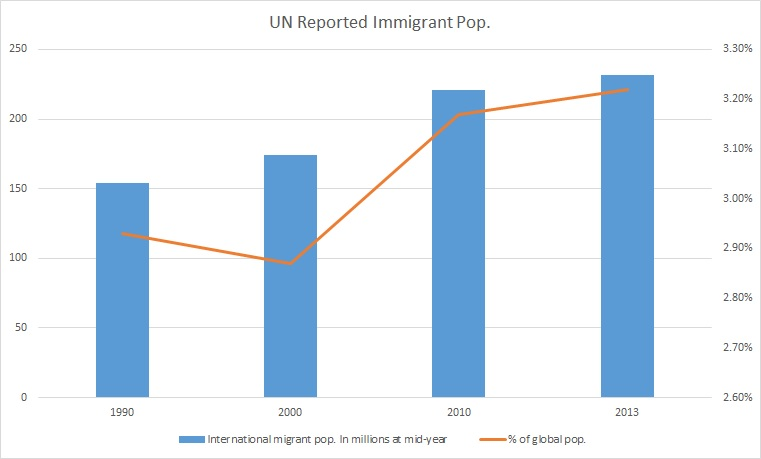
The global population of immigrants has grown since 1990 but has remained constant at around 3% of the world's population.

Immigration to nearly every Western country has risen sharply. Slopes of the tops of the differently-colored columns show the rate of percent increase in foreign-born people.

As of 2015, the number of international migrants has reached 244 million worldwide, which reflects a 41% increase since 2000. The largest number of international migrants live in the United States, with 19% of the world's total. One third of the world's international migrants are living in just 20 countries. Germany and Russia host 12 million migrants each, taking the second and third place in countries with the most migrants worldwide. Saudi Arabia hosts 10 million migrants, followed by the United Kingdom (9 million) and the United Arab Emirates (8 million). In most parts of the world, migration occurs between countries that are located within the same major area. Between 2000 and 2015, Asia added more international migrants than any other major area in the world, gaining 26 million. Europe added the second largest with about 20 million.

In 2015, the number of international migrants below the age of 20 reached 37 million, while 177 million are between the ages of 20 and 64. International migrants living in Africa were the youngest, with a median age of 29, followed by Asia (35 years), and Latin America/Caribbean (36 years), while migrants were older in Northern America (42 years), Europe (43 years), and Oceania (44 years).

Nearly half (43%) of all international migrants originate in Asia, and Europe was the birthplace of the second largest number of migrants (25%), followed by Latin America (15%). India has the largest diaspora in the world (16 million people), followed by Mexico (12 million) and Russia (11 million).

The number of migrants and migrant workers per country

The share of migrants and migrant workers per country

=== 2012 survey ===
A 2012 survey by Gallup found that given the opportunity, 640 million adults would migrate to another country, with 23% of these would-be immigrant choosing the United States as their desired future residence, while 7% of respondents, representing 45 million people, would choose the United Kingdom. Canada, France, Saudi Arabia, Australia, Germany, Spain, Italy, and the United Arab Emirates made up the rest of the top ten desired destination countries.

== Push and pull factors ==
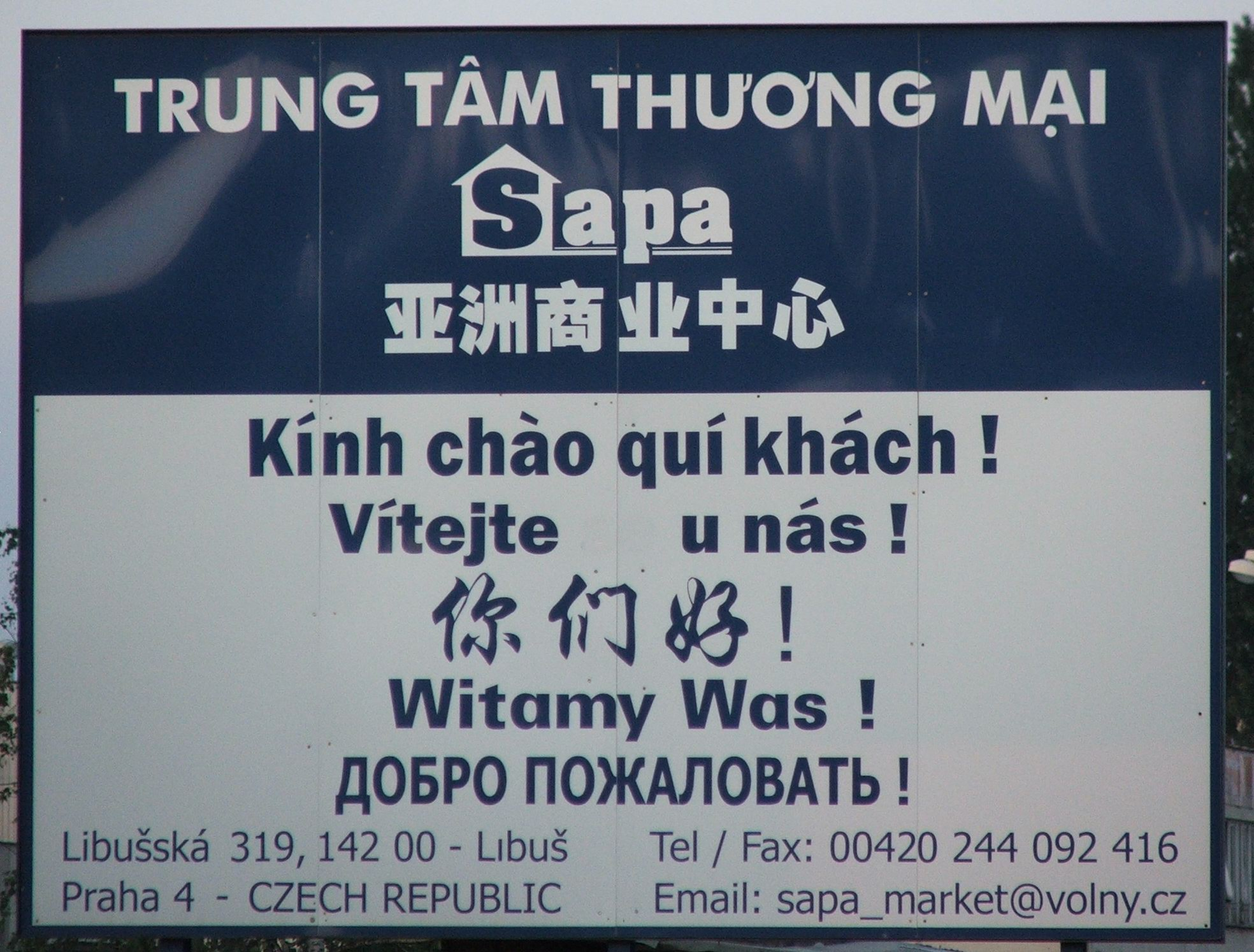
The largest Vietnamese market in Prague, also known as "Little Hanoi". In 2009, there were about 70,000 Vietnamese in the Czech Republic.

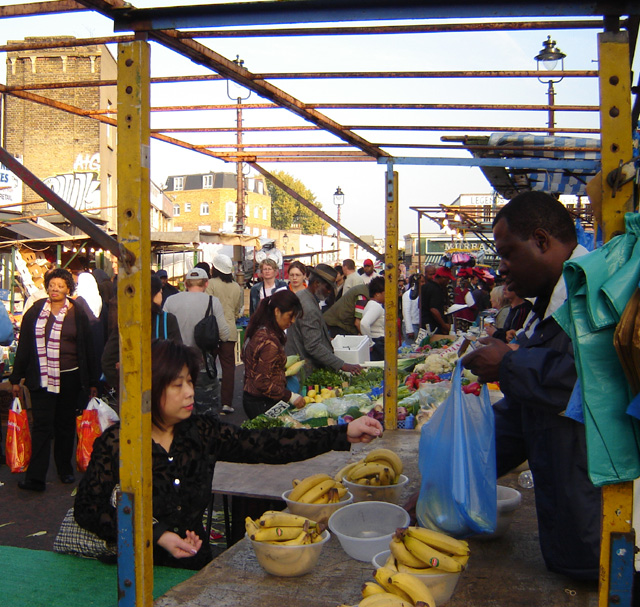
London has become multiethnic as a result of immigration. In London in 2008, Black British and British Asian children outnumbered white British children by about 3 to 2 in government-run schools.

One theory of immigration distinguishes between push and pull factors, referring to the economic, political, and social influences by which people migrate from or to specific countries. Immigrants are motivated to leave their former countries of citizenship, or habitual residence, for a variety of reasons, including: a lack of local access to resources, a desire for economic prosperity, to find or engage in paid work, to better their standard of living, family reunification, retirement, climate or environmentally induced migration, exile, escape from prejudice, conflict or natural disaster, or simply the wish to change one's quality of life. Commuters, tourists, and other short-term stays in a destination country do not fall under the definition of immigration or migration; seasonal labour immigration is sometimes included, however.

Push factors (or determinant factors) refer primarily to the motive for leaving one's country of origin (either voluntarily or involuntarily), whereas pull factors (or attraction factors) refer to one's motivations behind or the encouragement towards immigrating to a particular country.

In the case of economic migration (usually labor migration), differentials in wage rates are common. If the value of wages in the new country surpasses the value of wages in one's native country, he or she may choose to migrate, as long as the costs are not too high. Particularly in the 19th century, economic expansion of the US increased immigrant flow, and nearly 15% of the population was foreign-born, thus making up a significant amount of the labor force.

As transportation technology improved, travel time, and costs decreased dramatically between the 18th and early 20th century. Travel across the Atlantic used to take up to 5 weeks in the 18th century, but around the time of the 20th century it took a mere 8 days. When the opportunity cost is lower, the immigration rates tend to be higher. Escape from poverty (personal or for relatives staying behind) is a traditional push factor, and the availability of jobs is the related pull factor. Natural disasters can amplify poverty-driven migration flows. Research shows that for middle-income countries, higher temperatures increase emigration rates to urban areas and to other countries. For low-income countries, higher temperatures reduce emigration.

A study checking the push and pull factors for emigration from Guatemala found that environmental factors played even bigger role in comparison to economic. When they directly asked people to compare it, they got the next results:

Answer	Prevalence
Prefer lower wage with less climate risk	68%
Prefer higher wage with more climate risk	32%

Emigration and immigration are sometimes mandatory in a contract of employment: religious missionaries and employees of transnational corporations, international non-governmental organizations, and the diplomatic service expect, by definition, to work "overseas". They are often referred to as "expatriates", and their conditions of employment are typically equal to or better than those applying in the host country (for similar work).

Non-economic push factors include persecution (religious and otherwise), frequent abuse, bullying, oppression, ethnic cleansing, genocide, risks to civilians during war, and social marginalization. Political motives traditionally motivate refugee flows; for instance, people may emigrate in order to escape a dictatorship.

Some migration is for personal reasons, based on a relationship (e.g. to be with family or a partner), such as in family reunification or transnational marriage (especially in the instance of a gender imbalance) or same-sex relationship. Others migrate for safer opportunities to express gender identities and access to gender-affirming care. Recent research has found gender, age, and cross-cultural differences in the ownership of the idea to immigrate. In a few cases, an individual may wish to immigrate to a new country in a form of transferred patriotism. Evasion of criminal justice (e.g., avoiding arrest) is a personal motivation. This type of emigration and immigration is not normally legal, if a crime is internationally recognized, although criminals may disguise their identities or find other loopholes to evade detection. For example, there have been reports of war criminals disguising themselves as victims of war or conflict and then pursuing asylum in a different country.

Barriers to immigration come not only in legal form or political form; natural and social barriers to immigration can also be very powerful. Immigrants when leaving their country also leave everything familiar: their family, friends, support network, and culture. They also need to liquidate their assets, and they incur the expense of moving. When they arrive in a new country, this is often with many uncertainties including finding work, where to live, new laws, new cultural norms, language or accent issues, possible racism, and other exclusionary behavior towards them and their family.

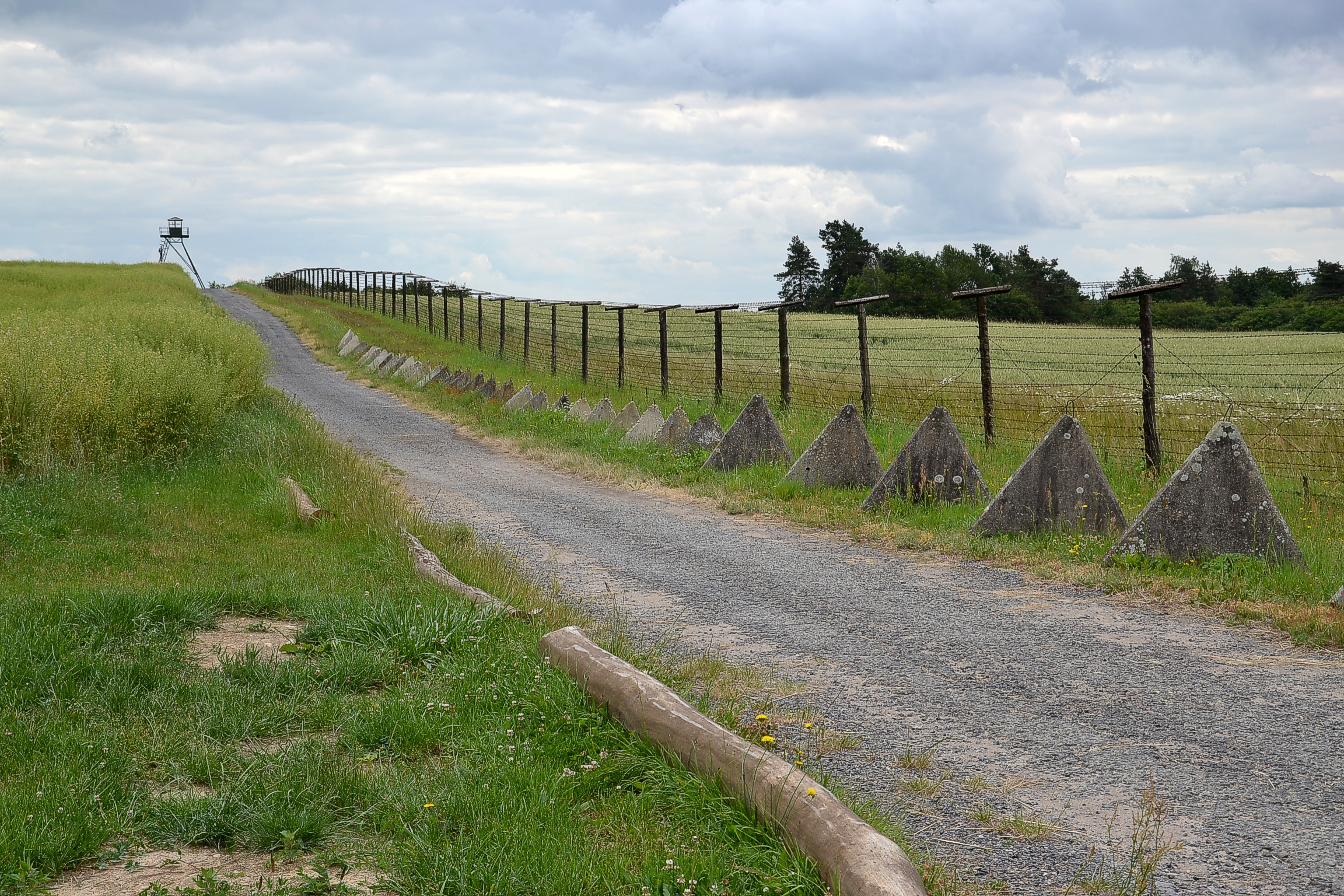
The Iron Curtain in Europe was designed as a means of preventing emigration. "It is one of the ironies of post-war European history that, once the freedom to travel for Europeans living under communist regimes, which had long been demanded by the West, was finally granted in 1989/90, travel was very soon afterwards made much more difficult by the West itself, and new barriers were erected to replace the Iron Curtain." —Anita Böcker

Discrimination and punishment based on sexual orientation and gender identity are legally sanctioned in numerous nations, with some imposing the death penalty for same-sex acts. This pattern of discrimination manifests in immigration policies, where laws can restrict access to services and safe asylums for marginalized groups, including people of colour and members of the LGBTQ community. The countries where asylum is sought are also not entirely free from discrimination, complicating efforts to achieve safety.

=== Environmental migration ===
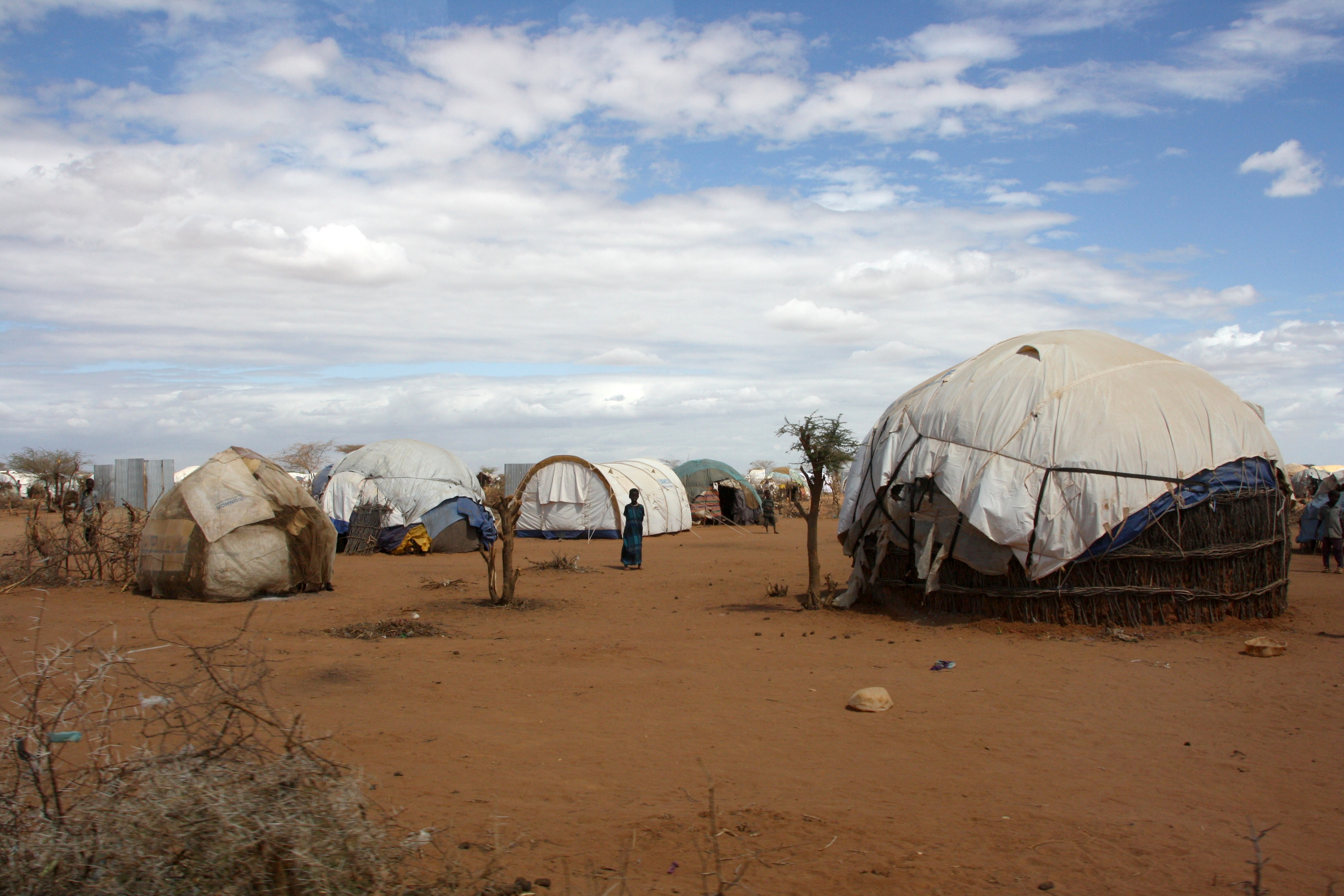
Shelters in Kenya for those displaced by the 2011 Horn of Africa drought

Environmental migrants are people who are forced to leave their home of residency due to sudden or long-term changes to their local or regional environment. These changes compromise their well-being or livelihood, and include increased drought, desertification, sea level rise, and disruption of seasonal weather patterns (such as monsoons). Though there is no uniform, clear-cut definition of environmental migration, the idea is gaining attention as policy-makers and environmental and social scientists attempt to conceptualize the potential social effects of climate change and other environmental degradation. Environmental migration also reflects broader global inequalities, as marginalized and racialized communities often experience the most severe environmental degradation while having the least resources and political power to adapt or relocate. Environmental migrants originate from a variety of different locations, including Small Island Developing States.

"Environmental migrant" and "climate migrant" (or "climate refugee") are used somewhat interchangeably with a range of similar terms, such as ecological refugee, environmental refugee, forced environmental migrant, environmentally motivated migrant, environmentally displaced person (EDP), disaster refugee, environmental displacee, eco-refugee, ecologically displaced person, or environmental-refugee-to-be (ERTB). The distinctions between these terms remain contested.

=== Economic migrant ===
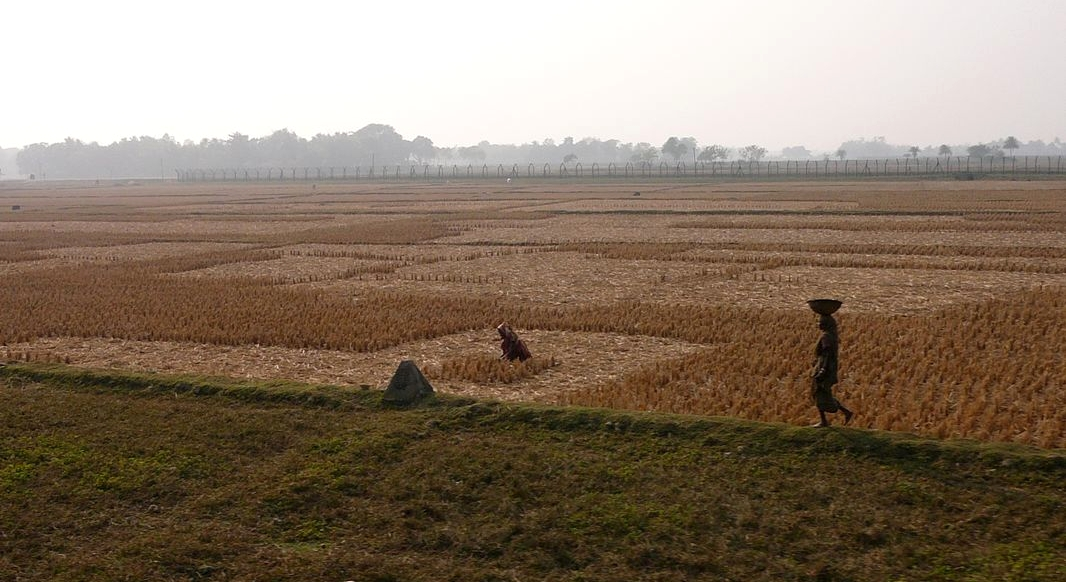
The Indo-Bangladeshi barrier in 2007. India is building a separation barrier along the 4,000-kilometre (2,500 mi) border with Bangladesh to prevent illegal immigration.

The term economic migrant refers to someone who has travelled from one region to another region for the purposes of seeking employment and an improvement in quality of life and access to resources. An economic migrant is distinct from someone who is a refugee fleeing persecution.

Many countries have immigration and visa restrictions that prohibit a person entering the country for the purposes of gaining work without a valid work visa. As a violation of a State's immigration laws a person who is declared to be an economic migrant can be refused entry into a country.

The World Bank estimates that remittances totaled $420 billion in 2009, of which $317 billion went to developing countries.

== Economic effects ==
Research suggests that immigration can be beneficial both to the receiving and sending countries. Immigration can have positive economic effects on the native population, mixed effects where low-skilled immigration adversely affects underprivileged natives, reduce wages due to elasticity of labor supply, or achieve negative projected economic life-cycle impacts. Studies suggest that the elimination of barriers to migration would have profound effects on world GDP, with estimates of gains ranging between 67 and 147 percent for the scenarios in which 37 to 53 percent of the developing countries' workers migrate to the developed countries. Some development economists argue that reducing barriers to labor mobility or trade between developing countries and developed countries would be one of the most efficient tools of poverty reduction. Work permits can crowd out citizens and increase unemployment. Due to the compositional effect immigrants with below median income decrease and immigrants with above median income increase the median income of the whole population of a country.

=== Quality of institutions ===
A 2015 study finds "some evidence that larger immigrant population shares (or inflows) yield positive impacts on institutional quality. At a minimum, our results indicate that no negative impact on economic freedom is associated with more immigration." Another study, looking at the increase in Israel's population in the 1990s due to the unrestricted immigration of Jews from the Soviet Union, finds that the mass immigration did not undermine political institutions, and substantially increased the quality of economic institutions. A 2017 study in the British Journal of Political Science argued that the British American colonies without slavery adopted better democratic institutions in order to attract migrant workers to their colonies. A 2018 study fails to find evidence that immigration to the United States weakens economic freedom. A 2019 study of Jordan found that the massive influx of refugees into Jordan during the Gulf War had long-lasting positive effects on Jordanian economic institutions.

=== Education ===
A 2016 study found that immigration in the period 1940–2010 in the United States increased the high school completion of natives: "An increase of one percentage point in the share of immigrants in the population aged 11–64 increases the probability that natives aged 11–17 eventually complete 12 years of schooling by 0.3 percentage point." A 2019 NBER paper found little evidence that exposure to foreign-born students had an effect on US-born students.

Studies have found that non-native speakers of English in the UK have no causal effect on the performance of other pupils, immigrant children have no significant effect on the test scores of Dutch children, no effect on grade repetition among native students exposed to migrant students in Austrian schools, that the presence of Latin American children in schools had no significant negative effects on peers, but that students with limited English skills had slight negative effects on peers, and that the influx of Haitians to Florida public schools after the 2010 Haiti earthquake had no effects on the educational outcomes of incumbent students.

A 2018 study found that the "presence of immigrant students who have been in the country for some time is found to have no effect on natives. However, a small negative effect of recent immigrants on natives' language scores is reported." Another 2018 study found that the presence of immigrant students to Italy was associated with "small negative average effects on maths test scores that are larger for low ability native students, strongly non-linear and only observable in classes with a high (top 20%) immigrant concentration. These outcomes are driven by classes with a high average linguistic distance between immigrants and natives, with no apparent additional role played by ethnic diversity."

After immigrant children's scores were included in Programme for International Student Assessment (PISA) 15-year-old school pupils' educational evaluations in Sweden the Swedish PISA scores significantly decreased.

=== Social capital ===
There is some research that suggests that immigration adversely affects social capital. One study, for instance, found that "larger increases in US states' Mexican population shares correspond to larger decreases in social capital over the period" 1986–2004. A 2017 study in the Journal of Comparative Economics found that "individuals whose ancestors migrated from countries with higher autocracy levels are less likely to trust others and to vote in presidential elections in the U.S. The impact of autocratic culture on trust can last for at least three generations while the impact on voting disappears after one generation. These impacts on trust and voting are also significant across Europe." A 2019 study found that "humans are inclined to react negatively to threats to homogeneity... in the short term. However, these negative outcomes are compensated in the long term by the beneficial influence of intergroup contact, which alleviates initial negative influences."

=== Health ===
Research suggests that immigration has positive effects on native workers' health. As immigration rises, native workers are pushed into less demanding jobs, which improves native workers' health outcomes.

A 2018 study found that immigration to the United Kingdom "reduced waiting times for outpatient referrals and did not have significant effects on waiting times in accident and emergency departments (A&E) and elective care." The study also found "evidence that immigration increased waiting times for outpatient referrals in more deprived areas outside of London" but that this increase disappears after 3 to 4 years.

A 2018 systemic review and meta-analysis in The Lancet found that migrants generally have better health than the general population.

In the EU, the use of personal health records for migrants is being tested in the new REHEALTH 2 project.

High immigration can cause higher stress on highly regulated sectors such as healthcare, education, and housing, leading to negative effects.

=== Housing ===
Immigration tends to increase both local rents and house prices, but this dependency varies depending on factors including price elasticity of new housing supply, socioeconomics of immigrants, and internal migration of natives.

=== Crime ===
The relationship between immigration and crime has been a subject of extensive research, political discourse, and public debate.

Immigrants are disproportionately represented in prison populations in many Western countries, though notable exceptions exist, such as the United States. In Europe and other regions, higher representation in prisons among immigrants, particularly Muslim populations, has been documented. However, some of the factors contributing to these trends include imprisonment for migration-related offenses and systemic bias in policing and judicial processes, which may inflate crime statistics for immigrant populations relative to their real criminal rate. Research suggests that public perception often exaggerates the connection between immigration and crime, influenced by sensationalised media coverage and political rhetoric. This can result in stricter immigration controls, as well as harsher immigration policies like family separation; along with a potential increase in hate crimes against immigrant communities.

Bogus recruitment agencies and rogue recruitment agencies make fake promises of better opportunities, education, income, some of the abuses and crimes experienced by immigrants are the followed:

- Employees are forced to work in activities that were not included in their contracts, where workplace harassment is openly allowed, tolerated and even promoted.
- Workers are forced to work more than 20 hours a day with low wages or no payment,
- Slavery,
- human trafficking,
- Sexual harassment, sexual abuse, sexual assault, sexual exploitation.
- Offering fake immigrant visas in order to make it impossible for employees to return to their countries.

In many countries there is a lack of prosecution of this crimes, since these countries obtain benefits and taxes paid by these companies that benefit the economies and also because of the current shortage of workers.

== Integration ==
A 2019 review of existing research in the Annual Review of Sociology on immigrant assimilation in the United States, the United Kingdom, France, Germany, Sweden, Norway, Belgium, the Netherlands and Spain concluded "we find an overall pattern of intergenerational assimilation in terms of socioeconomic attainment, social relations, and cultural beliefs." Some immigrants show intolerant views and prefer separation instead of assimilation.

=== United States ===
A 2018 study in the American Sociological Review found that within racial groups, most immigrants to the United States had fully assimilated within a span of 20 years. Immigrants arriving in the United States after 1994 assimilate more rapidly than immigrants who arrived in previous periods. Measuring assimilation can be difficult due to "ethnic attrition", which refers to when descendants of migrants cease to self-identify with the nationality or ethnicity of their ancestors. This means that successful cases of assimilation will be underestimated. Research shows that ethnic attrition is sizable in Hispanic and Asian immigrant groups in the United States. By taking account of ethnic attrition, the assimilation rate of Hispanics in the United States improves significantly. A 2016 paper challenges the view that cultural differences are necessarily an obstacle to long-run economic performance of migrants. It finds that "first generation migrants seem to be less likely to success the more culturally distant they are, but this effect vanishes as time spent in the US increases."

A 2018 study found that Chinese nationals in the United States who received permanent residency permits from the US government amid the Tiananmen Square protests (and subsequent Chinese government clampdown) experienced significant employment and earnings gains relative to similar immigrant groups who did not have the same residency rights.

During the Age of Mass Migration, infant arrivals to the United States had greater economic success over their lifetime than teenage arrivals.

=== Europe ===
A 2015 report by the National Institute of Demographic Studies finds that an overwhelming majority of second-generation immigrants of all origins in France feel French, despite the persistent discrimination in education, housing and employment that many of the minorities face.

Research shows that country of origin matters for speed and depth of immigrant assimilation but that there is considerable assimilation overall. Research finds that first generation immigrants from countries with less egalitarian gender cultures adopt gender values more similar to natives over time. According to one study, "this acculturation process is almost completed within one generational succession: The gender attitudes of second generation immigrants are difficult to distinguish from the attitudes of members of mainstream society. This holds also for children born to immigrants from very gender traditional cultures and for children born to less well integrated immigrant families." Similar results are found on a study of Turkish migrants to Western Europe. The assimilation on gender attitudes has been observed in education, as one study finds "that the female advantage in education observed among the majority population is usually present among second-generation immigrants."

A 2017 study of Switzerland found that naturalization strongly improves long-term social integration of immigrants: "The integration returns to naturalization are larger for more marginalized immigrant groups and when naturalization occurs earlier, rather than later in the residency period." A separate study of Switzerland found that naturalization improved the economic integration of immigrants: "winning Swiss citizenship in the referendum increased annual earnings by an average of approximately 5,000 U.S. dollars over the subsequent 15 years. This effect is concentrated among more marginalized immigrants."

First-generation immigrants tend to hold less accepting views of homosexuality but opposition weakens with longer stays. Second-generation immigrants are overall more accepting of homosexuality, but the acculturation effect is weaker for Muslims and to some extent, Eastern Orthodox migrants.

A study of Bangladeshi migrants in East London found they shifted towards the thinking styles of the wider non-migrant population in just a single generation.

A study on Germany found that foreign-born parents are more likely to integrate if their children are entitled to German citizenship at birth. A 2017 study found that "faster access to citizenship improves the economic situation of immigrant women, especially their labour market attachment with higher employment rates, longer working hours and more stable jobs. Immigrants also invest more in host country-specific skills like language and vocational training. Faster access to citizenship seems a powerful policy instrument to boost economic integration in countries with traditionally restrictive citizenship policies." Naturalization is associated with large and persistent wage gains for the naturalized citizens in most countries. One study of Denmark found that providing immigrants with voting rights reduced their crime rate.

Studies on programs that randomly allocate refugee immigrants across municipalities find that the assignment of neighborhood affects immigrant crime propensity, education, and earnings. A 2019 study found that refugees who resettled in areas with many conationals were more likely to be economically integrated.

Research suggests that bilingual schooling reduces barriers between speakers from two different communities.

Research suggests that a vicious cycle of bigotry and isolation could reduce assimilation and increase bigotry towards immigrants in the long-term. For instance, University of California, San Diego political scientist Claire Adida, Stanford University political scientist David Laitin and Sorbonne University economist Marie-Anne Valfort argue "fear-based policies that target groups of people according to their religion or region of origin are counter-productive. Our own research, which explains the failed integration of Muslim immigrants in France, suggests that such policies can feed into a vicious cycle that damages national security. French Islamophobia – a response to cultural difference – has encouraged Muslim immigrants to withdraw from French society, which then feeds back into French Islamophobia, thus further exacerbating Muslims' alienation, and so on. Indeed, the failure of French security in 2015 was likely due to police tactics that intimidated rather than welcomed the children of immigrants – an approach that makes it hard to obtain crucial information from community members about potential threats."

A study which examined Catalan nationalism examined the Catalan Government's policy towards the integration of immigrants during the start of the 1990s. At this time the Spanish region of Catalonia was experiencing a large influx in the number of immigrants from Northern Africa, Latin America and Asia. The Spanish government paid little attention to this influx of immigrants. However, Catalan politicians began discussing how the increase in immigrants would effect Catalan identity. Members of the Catalan parliament petitioned for a plan to integrate these immigrants into Catalan society. Crucially, the plan did not include policies regarding naturalisation, which were key immigration policies of the Spanish government. The plan of the Catalan parliament aimed to create a shared Catalan identity which included both the native Catalan population and immigrant communities. This meant that immigrants were encouraged to relate as part of the Catalan community but also encouraged to retain their own culture and traditions. In this way assimilation of immigrant cultures in Catalonia was avoided.

A 2018 study in the British Journal of Political Science found that immigrants in Norway became more politically engaged the earlier that they were given voting rights.

A 2019 study in the European Economic Review found that language training improved the economic assimilation of immigrants in France.

A 2020 study using data from large-scale comparative surveys in Germany, France, and United Kingdom found that sampled households with a language barrier tend to have poor living conditions and are migrants. Inferences about their demographic, attitudinal, or behavioral traits cannot be made because the ability to speak the official language(s) of the country is one of the criteria for survey participation.

A 2020 paper on reforms of refugee policy in Denmark found that language training boosted the economic and social integration of refugees, whereas cuts to refugees' welfare benefits had no effect, except to temporarily increase property crimes.

== Discrimination ==
=== Europe ===
Research suggests that police practices, such as racial profiling, over-policing in areas populated by minorities and in-group bias may result in disproportionately high numbers of racial minorities among crime suspects in Sweden, Italy, and England and Wales. Research also suggests that there may be possible discrimination by the judicial system, which contributes to a higher number of convictions for racial minorities in Sweden, the Netherlands, Italy, Germany, Denmark and France. A 2018 study found that the Dutch are less likely to reciprocate in games played with immigrants than the native Dutch.

Several meta-analyses find extensive evidence of ethnic and racial discrimination in hiring in the North-American and European labor markets. A 2016 meta-analysis of 738 correspondence tests in 43 separate studies conducted in OECD countries between 1990 and 2015 finds that there is extensive racial discrimination in hiring decisions in Europe and North-America. Equivalent minority candidates need to send around 50% more applications to be invited for an interview than majority candidates.

A 2014 meta-analysis found extensive evidence of racial and ethnic discrimination in the housing market of several European countries.

==== United Kingdom ====
Since 2010, the United Kingdom's policies surrounding immigrant detention have come under fire for insufficiently protecting vulnerable groups. In the early 2000s, the United Kingdom adopted the Detention Duty Advice (DDA) scheme in order to provide free, government-funded, legal aid to immigrants. The DDA scheme at face value granted liberty on administrative grounds by considering immigrant merits, nature of their work, their financial means, and other factors that would then determine how much free legal aid detainees were granted. Recent research by the Organization for Economic Cooperation and Development (OECD), demonstrates that marginalized groups have been barred from legal assistance in detention centers. The barriers immigrants face in order to access justice through the DDA disproportionately affected underrepresented groups of immigrants, and the language barrier and lack of interpreters led to further hurdles that detainees were unable to jump through.

=== Canada ===
In Canada immigrant detainees face barriers to justice due to a lack of international enforcement. Canada's immigration detention system has significant legal and normative problems, and the rubric of 'access to justice' that is presented by international law fails to identify these faults. There is a lack of access to legal aid for immigrants in detention, as well as inhumane treatment in detention centers. Research has demonstrated irreparable psychological, physical, and social damage to immigrants, and the international community ignores these injustices.

=== United States ===
==== Business ====
A 2014 meta-analysis of racial discrimination in product markets found extensive evidence of minority applicants being quoted higher prices for products. A 1995 study found that car dealers "quoted significantly lower prices to white males than to black or female test buyers using identical, scripted bargaining strategies." A 2013 study found that eBay sellers of iPods received 21 percent more offers if a white hand held the iPod in the photo than a black hand.

==== Criminal justice system ====
Research suggests that police practices, such as racial profiling, over-policing in areas populated by minorities and in-group bias may result in disproportionately high numbers of racial minorities among crime suspects. Research also suggests that there may be possible discrimination by the judicial system, which contributes to a higher number of convictions for racial minorities. A 2012 study found that "(i) juries formed from all-white jury pools convict black defendants significantly (16 percentage points) more often than white defendants, and (ii) this gap in conviction rates is entirely eliminated when the jury pool includes at least one black member." Research has found evidence of in-group bias, where "black (white) juveniles who are randomly assigned to black (white) judges are more likely to get incarcerated (as opposed to being placed on probation), and they receive longer sentences." In-group bias has also been observed when it comes to traffic citations, as black and white cops are more likely to cite out-groups.

==== Education ====
A 2015 study using correspondence tests "found that when considering requests from prospective students seeking mentoring in the future, faculty were significantly more responsive to White males than to all other categories of students, collectively, particularly in higher-paying disciplines and private institutions."

According to an analysis of the National Study of College Experience, elite colleges may favor minority applicants due to affirmative action policies.

A 2018 National Bureau of Economic Research paper found that math teachers discriminate against the children of immigrants. When the teachers were informed about negative stereotypes towards the children of immigrants, they gave higher grades to the children of immigrants.

As of 2020, 2 percent of all students enrolled in U.S. higher education. That comes out to about 454,000 students. Fewer than half of illegal immigrants are eligible for the DACA program.

==== Housing ====
A 2014 meta-analysis found extensive evidence of racial discrimination in the American housing market. Minority applicants for housing needed to make many more enquiries to view properties. Geographical steering of African-Americans in US housing remained significant. A 2003 study finds "evidence that agents interpret an initial housing request as an indication of a customer's preferences, but also are more likely to withhold a house from all customers when it is in an integrated suburban neighborhood (redlining). Moreover, agents' marketing efforts increase with asking price for white, but not for black, customers; blacks are more likely than whites to see houses in suburban, integrated areas (steering); and the houses agents show are more likely to deviate from the initial request when the customer is black than when the customer is white. These three findings are consistent with the possibility that agents act upon the belief that some types of transactions are relatively unlikely for black customers (statistical discrimination)."

A report by the federal Department of Housing and Urban Development where the department sent African-Americans and whites to look at apartments found that African-Americans were shown fewer apartments to rent and houses for sale.

==== Labor market ====
Several meta-analyses find extensive evidence of ethnic and racial discrimination in hiring in the American labor market. A 2016 meta-analysis of 738 correspondence tests – tests where identical CVs for stereotypically black and white names were sent to employers – in 43 separate studies conducted in OECD countries between 1990 and 2015 finds that there is extensive racial discrimination in hiring decisions in Europe and North-America. These correspondence tests showed that equivalent minority candidates need to send around 50% more applications to be invited for an interview than majority candidates. A study that examine the job applications of actual people provided with identical résumés and similar interview training showed that African-American applicants with no criminal record were offered jobs at a rate as low as white applicants who had criminal records.

== Politics of immigration ==
Businesses tend to lobby in favor of more immigration, while labor movements tend to oppose immigration according to a 2011 study. A 2010 European study suggested that "employers are more likely to be pro-immigration than employees, provided that immigrants are thought to compete with employees who are already in the country. Or else, when immigrants are thought to compete with employers rather than employees, employers are more likely to be anti-immigration than employees." A 2011 study examining the voting of US representatives on migration policy suggests that "representatives from more skilled labor abundant districts are more likely to support an open immigration policy towards the unskilled, whereas the opposite is true for representatives from more unskilled labor abundant districts." Studies have suggested that some special interest groups lobby for less immigration for their own group and more immigration for other groups since they see effects of immigration, such as increased labor competition, as detrimental when affecting their own group but beneficial when affecting other groups.

The politics of immigration have become increasingly associated with other issues, such as national security and terrorism, with the presence of Islam as a new major religion. Those with security concerns cite the 2005 French riots and point to the Jyllands-Posten Muhammad cartoons controversy as examples of the value conflicts arising from immigration of Muslims in Western Europe. Because of all these associations, immigration has become an emotional political issue in many European nations.

Another contributing factor may be lobbying by earlier immigrants. The chairman for the US Irish Lobby for Immigration Reform – which lobby for more permissive rules for immigrants, as well as special arrangements just for Irish people – has stated that "the Irish Lobby will push for any special arrangement it can get – 'as will every other ethnic group in the country.'"

Some research has found that as immigration and ethnic heterogeneity increase, government funding of welfare and public support for welfare decrease. Ethnic nepotism may be an explanation for this phenomenon. Other possible explanations include theories regarding in-group and out-group effects and reciprocal altruism.

Research however also challenges the notion that ethnic heterogeneity reduces public goods provision. Studies that find a negative relationship between ethnic diversity and public goods provision often fail to take into account that strong states were better at assimilating minorities, thus decreasing diversity in the long run. Ethnically diverse states today consequently tend to be weaker states. Because most of the evidence on fractionalization comes from sub-Saharan Africa and the United States, the generalizability of the findings is questionable. A 2018 study in the American Political Science Review cast doubts on findings that ethnoracial homogeneity led to greater public goods provision.

Immigrants and second-generation immigrants were found on average to vote more for left-wing politics compared to non-immigrants.

A 2024 working paper by Borjas and Breznau found that pro-immigration research teams estimated more positive impacts of migration on the public support for welfare, while anti-immigration teams reported more negative estimates; the immigration researchers skewed heavily towards a pro-immigration stance.

Utilizing migration to achieve a particular objective has been called replacement migration, replacement theory, demographic engineering or settler colonialism. Settler colonialism has been described as eliminationism due to the replacement of a group.

=== Attitudes toward immigrants ===
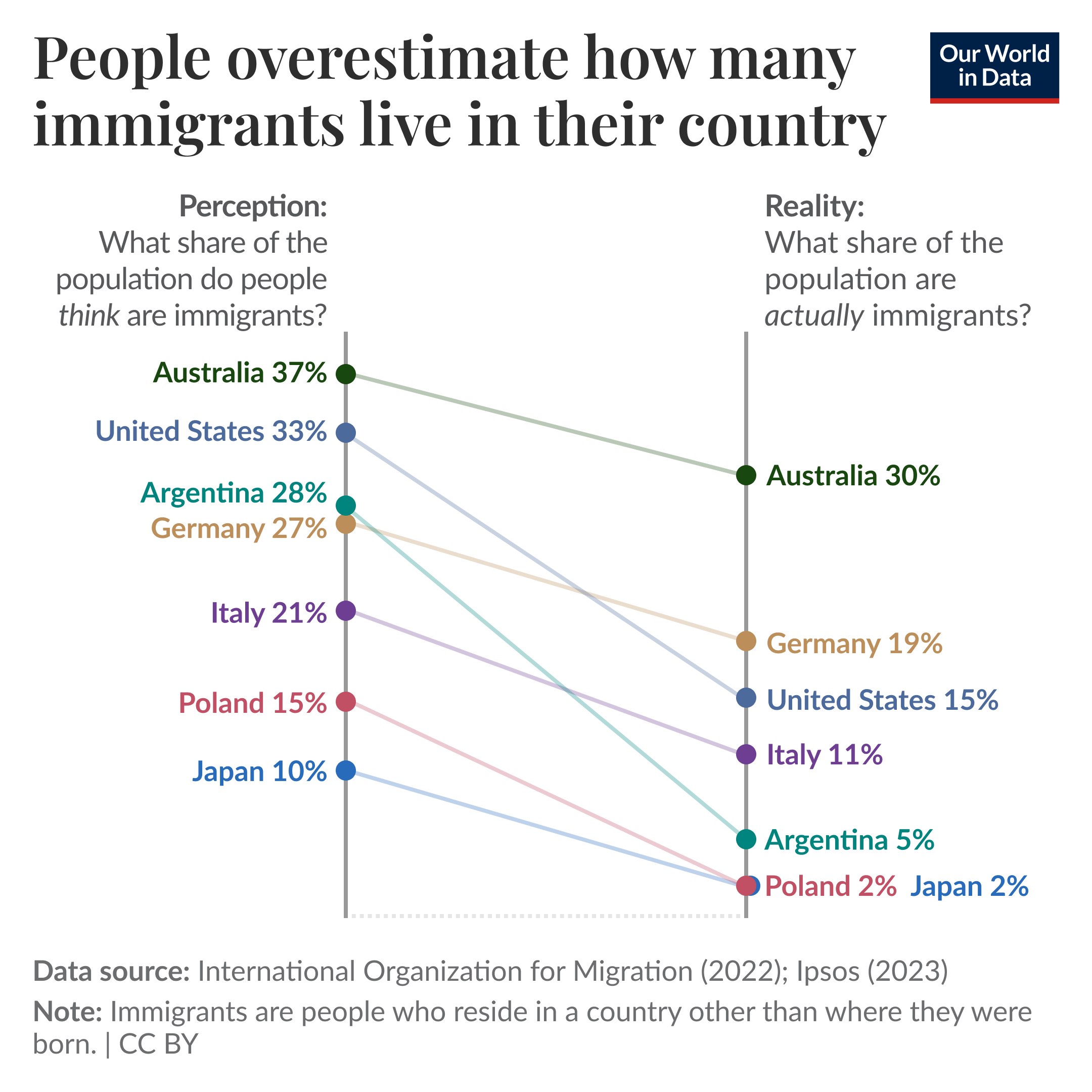
People tend to think there are more immigrants in their country than there really are.

Americans and Europeans tend to overestimate the share of immigrants in their countries. Relative overestimation tends to be greater in countries where the actual foreign-born share is low. Cross-national differences in attitudes toward immigration are only weakly related to the actual size, composition, or recent growth of the foreign-born population.

The Pew Research Center has indicated that there are generally more people who perceive immigrants' effect on their country because of their work and talents as an advantage rather than a disadvantage across 18 countries (including the United States and several European countries with the largest migrant populations) containing a combined 51% of the world's migrant population; there are generally more people in favor of deporting immigrants living in their country illegally across the same parameters. While there are more people on the ideological left who have a positive view of immigrants and more people on the ideological right who are in favor of deporting illegal immigrants, there is no necessary correspondence with what most people on each end of the political spectrum are inclined to support.

The media is a major influencing factor for attitudes towards immigrants. It is documented the more the media portrays immigration negatively, the less white Americans will vote in favor of open borders and the more likely they will continue believing in the immigrant threat narrative. This narrative claims the more immigrants there are, the bigger the threat there is to the native culture, language, homes, jobs, and even political offices. An analysis of three decades' worth of articles in The New York Times found their coverage increased the negative lens of immigration far more than the positive by focusing their articles mostly on negative aspects and images of immigration. Studies show that white Americans largely do not distinguish between American-born Latinos and immigrant Latinos when thinking about immigration issues, voting, and choosing partisan ties. Native-born individuals report slightly more positive views when asked about impacts an immigrant may have on their country, especially when considering their contribution to cultural life. However, when it comes to the labour market, half of the native-born population hold no particular view when it comes to immigrants taking or creating jobs.

Attitudes towards immigrants shift over time, much like any political issue. Using California as a case study, Manuel Pastor found that the views of immigration in the state have been fluid at best. While many view California as a liberal haven that is accepting and tolerant of immigrants today, much of the state's history has had less favorable views towards immigration. Pastor suggests there is a link between California's improved domestic economic stability over the past two decades and its attitudes towards immigrants. He argues California has created an environment more accepting of diversity by reducing the economic disparity between cities and the predominantly white suburbs, along with reforming some of the racist economic and educational policies created in the late seventies and early eighties (such as Proposition 13). He suggests this shift towards an ethos which sees liberal social reform and economic prosperity as compatible has driven the State's movement towards less punitive immigration reform. This view acknowledges the economic and social value of well-integrated immigrant communities. Pastor makes the point that even in societies where immigration is viewed negatively, values are able to shift, and if the thriving economic state of California can radically change the perception it has on immigration, then it is quite possible for other states or nations to shift their perceptions.

Research finds that Americans' attitudes towards immigration influence their attitudes towards welfare spending.

=== Public support and opposition ===
Public support for immigration by country in European Union according to Eurobarometer 2024:

Country	Immigration from outside EU		Immigration from other EU	
Country	Positive %	Negative %	Positive %	Negative %
Austria	37	58	60	34
Belgium	41	54	60	39
Bulgaria	25	67	54	37
Croatia	43	55	58	38
Cyprus	21	78	61	38
Czechia	16	82	42	55
Denmark	44	51	80	18
Estonia	22	70	59	35
Finland	45	49	84	13
France	38	56	59	36
Germany	34	60	66	29
Greece	19	78	57	41
Hungary	24	75	57	41
Ireland	62	34	81	16
Italy	43	54	62	36
Latvia	20	75	56	39
Lithuania	25	72	70	28
Luxembourg	59	37	87	10
Malta	22	76	64	35
Netherlands	45	52	71	28
Poland	50	47	75	22
Portugal	47	49	64	32
Romania	54	41	64	32
Slovakia	24	71	55	41
Slovenia	27	71	66	32
Spain	63	33	78	19
Sweden	62	36	89	11

=== Foreign involvement ===
Several countries have been accused of encouraging immigration to other countries in order to create divisions.

== Human capital flight ==
Many lower income countries face human capital flight to higher income countries. Human capital flight has been critised as a form of exploitative neocolonialism. Some countries have prohibited emigration advertisements.

== Immigration law ==
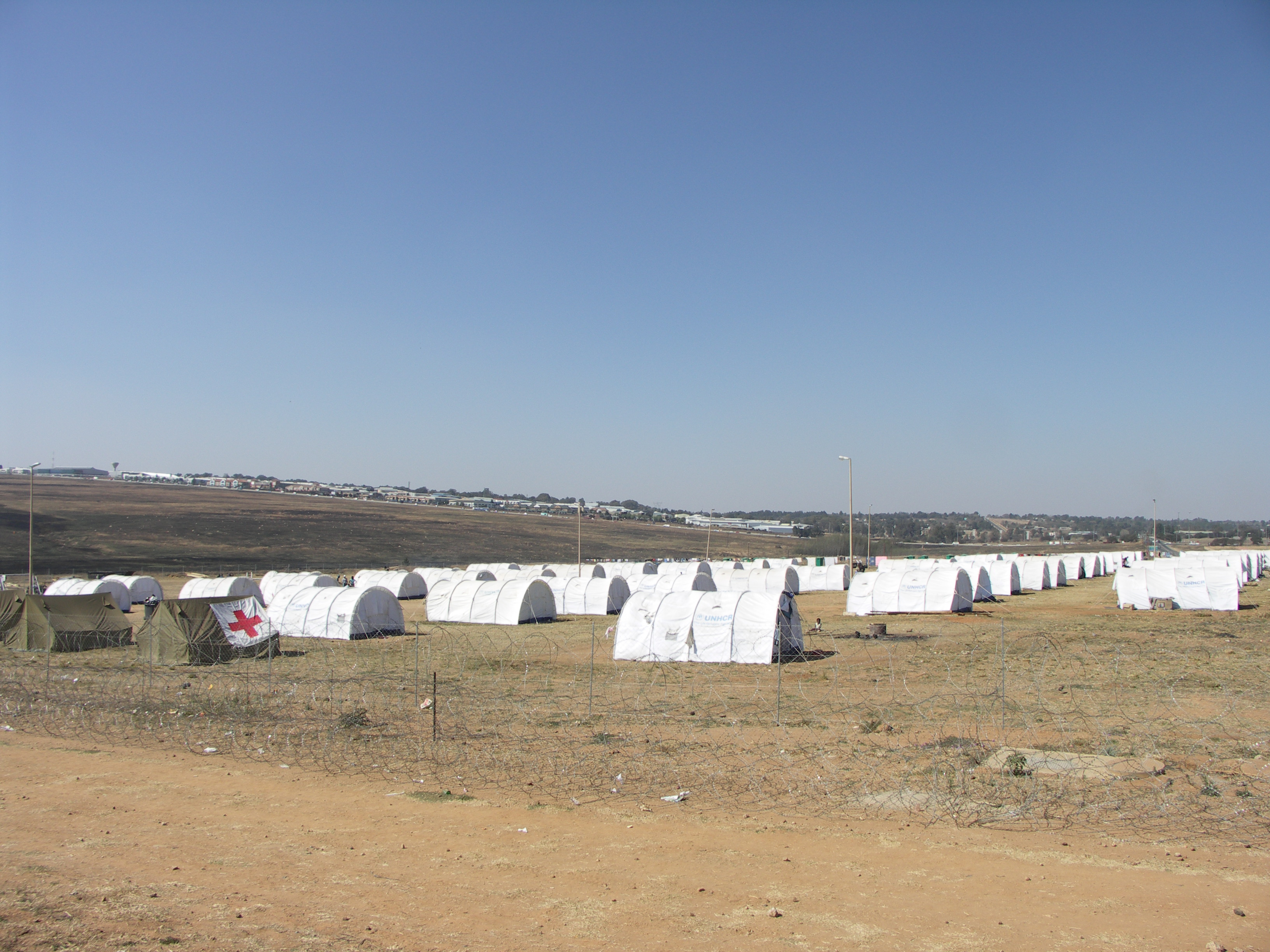
UNHCR tents at a refugee camp following episodes of anti-immigrant violence in South Africa, 2008

Legislation regarding immigrations differs per nation. International law includes rights, such as due process, suitable conditions, protection from unreasonable punishment and detention. However, nations are sovereign, and the protocols of international law cannot be enforced upon them. Nations have the freedom to handle immigrants as they choose, and to structure how any legal aid is distributed. Some human rights organizations strongly criticize individual nation-states for their immigration policies and practices.

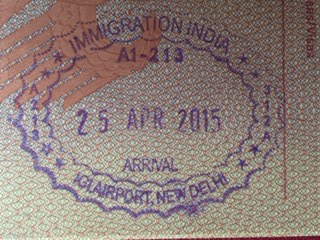
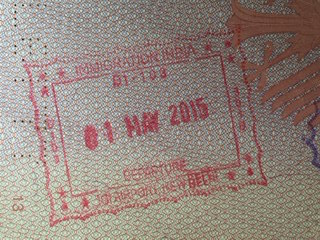
Entry (top) and Exit (bottom) passport stamps issued to a citizen of Germany by Indian immigration authorities at New Delhi airport.

Treatment of migrants in host countries, both by governments, employers, and original population, is a topic of continual debate and criticism, and the violation of migrant human rights is ongoing. The United Nations Convention on the Protection of the Rights of All Migrant Workers and Members of Their Families, has been ratified by 48 states, most of which are heavy exporters of cheap labor. Major migrant-receiving countries and regions – including Western Europe, North America, Pacific Asia, Australia, and the Gulf States – have not ratified the convention, even though they are host to the majority of international migrant workers. Although freedom of movement is often recognized as a civil right in many documents such as the Universal Declaration of Human Rights (1948) and the International Covenant on Civil and Political Rights (1966), the freedom only applies to movement within national borders and the ability to return to one's home state. Some argue that free migration is a right, and that the restrictive immigration policies, typical of nation-states, violate this right. Such arguments are common among libertarian perspectives on immigration. Open borders activist Jacob Appel has written, "Treating human beings differently, simply because they were born on the opposite side of a national boundary, is hard to justify under any mainstream philosophical, religious or ethical theory."

Where immigration is permitted, it is typically selective. As of 2003, family reunification accounted for approximately two-thirds of legal immigration to the US every year. Ethnic selection, such as the White Australia policy, has generally disappeared, but priority is usually given to the wealthy, educated or skilled worker migration. Exploitation of migrant labour, human trafficking and migrant sex work has been criticized.

Immigration policies which selectively grant freedom of movement to targeted individuals are intended to produce a net economic gain for the host country. They can also mean net loss for a poor donor country through brain drain. This can exacerbate the global inequality in standards of living that provided the motivation for the individual to migrate in the first place. One example of competition for skilled labour is active recruitment of health workers from developing countries by developed countries. There may however also be a "brain gain" to emigration, as migration opportunities lead to greater investments in education in developing countries. Overall, research suggests that migration in some cases can be beneficial both to the receiving and sending countries.

Persons who do not meet the immigration law return migrate to their country of citizenship in line with the right of return.

== See also ==
- Immigration country
- Immigration minister
- Immigration reform
- International migration
- Internal migration
- Multiculturalism
- People smuggling
- Repatriation
- Non-citizen suffrage
- Non-resident citizen voting
- Skilled worker#Migration
- White genocide conspiracy theory
- Women migrant workers from developing countries
- Xenophobia
