= Coulrophobia & Fata Morgana =

2016 short story collection by Jacob M. Appel

- First edition (publ. Black Lawrence Press)
- Author: Jacob M. Appel
- Language: English
- Publisher: Black Lawrence
- Publication date: 2016

Coulrophobia & Fata Morgana (2016) is the fifth collection of short stories by American author Jacob M. Appel. Like his previous collection, Miracles and Conundrums of the Secondary Planets, it was published by Black Lawrence. Coulrophobia & Fata Morgana was released in September 2016.

== Reception ==
In the Amsterdam Quarterly, Bryan R. Monte describes Appel as "one of American’s best short story writers" and that "Coulrophobia & Fata Morgana merely confirms this reputation". Striking13 backs up this opinion, saying that Appel has "mastered the underappreciated craft of short-form storytelling". Valerie Wieland of New Pages wrote of the collection that "All the stories are entertaining" and that Appel "appears to never stop writing, and that’s a good thing for readers."

== Contents ==
- The Butcher's Music
- The Punishment
- Pollen
- Boundaries
- Coulrophobia
- Saluting the Magpie
- Fata Morgana
- Hearth and Home
- Counting
- Silent Theology
