= Phone Home (disambiguation) =

Phone Home or Phoning Home may refer to:

- Phoning home, a computing term referring to the behavior of security systems that report network location, username, or other such data to another computer
- "E.T. phone home," a well-known line of dialogue from the 1982 film E.T. the Extra-Terrestrial
- "Phone Home" (Legends of Tomorrow), a television episode
- "Phone Home," a song on the 2008 Lil' Wayne album Tha Carter III
- The Phone Home Game, a retired pricing game on the television game show The Price Is Right
- Phoning Home (book), an essay collection by Jacob Appel
- "Phone Home" (Foster's Home for Imaginary Friends), a 2004 episode of Foster's Home for Imaginary Friends

== See also ==
- EP Phone Home (Ben Kweller EP), 2001
- EP Phone Home (Home Grown EP), 1999
- Home phone, a common term for a phone at a residence that uses a metal wire or optical fiber telephone line, as opposed to a mobile cellular line
