= Causa Mortis =

2009 play by Jacob M. Appel

Causa Mortis is a satiric play by Jacob M. Appel that lampoons the modern medical establishment. The plot focuses on a woman, Eleanor, whose brain surgeon has accidentally left his watch in her skull. Her daughters urge her to have the timepiece extracted before it harms her, but every surgeon who attempts to remove it dies during the process. Critic Donald Calamia described the play as "a needle in the eyes of an industry that far-too often refuses to admit its human failings."

The play opened at Detroit Repertory Theatre in November 2009. The production was directed by Bruce E. Millan. It featured actress Sandra Birch as Eleanor, Lisa Lauren Smith as an inept medical student assisting in Eleanor's care and Yolanda Jack as a quadriplegic amnesiac who shares her hospital room. It premiered in Canada at the South Simcoe Theater in Cookstown in May 2013 under the direction of Nancy Knapp

The play premiered at the height of public debate over healthcare reform in the United States, a phenomenon noted by many critics.

William Roetzheim selected Causa Mortis for inclusion in Regional Best 2011 as one of the nine top plays to premiere at regional theaters during the 2009-10 season.
