= Killing of Sarah Rae-Anne Root =

American woman killed by a drunk driver (1994–2016)

Sarah Rae-Ann Root
- Born: May 1, 1994
- Died: January 31, 2016 (aged 21); Omaha, Nebraska, US
- Cause of death: Hit by drunk driver
- Education: Bellevue University
- Parents: Scott Root (father); Michelle Root (mother)

Sarah Rae-Ann Root (May 1, 1994 – January 31, 2016) was an American woman who was killed by a drunk driver. She had recently graduated from college when her car was stuck by another vehicle, killing her. The driver, Eswin Mejia, was in the U.S. illegally and was placed on the ICE Most Wanted List. His blood alcohol content was 0.241, three times the legal limit. Sarah's mother, Michelle, became an advocate for changing the laws for illegal immigrants.

In his presidential acceptance speech, Donald Trump criticized the Obama administration's immigration policy, referencing Root as being "just one more American life that wasn't worth protecting" and "one more child to sacrifice on the altar of open borders".

== Death ==
After leaving her college graduation she stopped at a traffic light when her car was stuck by Eswin Meija, speeding at 80 miles per hour (130 km/h), sending Root’s car 306 feet (93 m) forward and killing her. He was street racing and drunk when he struck her, as well as being on a suspended license.

== Capture and Arrest of Meija ==
In 2025, Honduran Police captured and arrested Meija with negotiations in extraditing him back to the U.S. He was soon extradited back to the U.S. On February 2, 2026, Eswin Meija, was convicted of vehicular homicide and flight to avoid arrest, and sentenced to 20-22 years in prison.

== Sarah's Law ==
After her death, her mother brought the matter to Iowa Senators Charles Grassley and Joni Ernst and Nebraska Senators Deb Fischer and Ben Sasse for the implementation of Sarah's Law. The law would require "U.S. Immigration and Customs Enforcement to take into custody certain undocumented immigrants who have been charged in the United States with a crime that resulted in the death or serious bodily injury of another person" As of 2020, the bill has not passed into law, although portions were implemented in a 2017 executive order by President Trump directing the Secretary of Homeland Security to prioritize the removal of violent criminals.
