= Millard Salter's Last Day =

2017 novel by Jacob M. Appel

- Author: Jacob M. Appel
- Language: English
- Publisher: Simon & Schuster (Gallery)
- Publication date: November 2017
- Publication place: United States
- ISBN: 978-1507204085

Millard Salter's Last Day is an American novel by Jacob M. Appel. It was published by Simon & Schuster in 2017. The novel won the Faulkner-Wisdom Prize for the Novel in 2016. Judge John Gregory Brown, the chair of the awards panel, wrote of the novel: "It is a remarkably astute and funny novel about death, utterly convincing in every way. If this author isn't an elderly psychiatrist from New York, then the novel is a feat of astounding research and ventriloquism."

== Plot ==
The novel tells the story of the final day in the life of a 75-year-old psychiatrist, Millard Salter, who runs the consult-liaison service at St. Dymphna's Hospital in New York City. Salter's second wife has died a slow, painful death of cancer, so he volunteers with an underground organization that helps terminally-ill patients commit suicide. However, he falls in love with the first such patient to whom he is assigned, Delilah, and decides to end his own life on the same day that she ends hers.

== Reception ==
The Washington Post described the novel's protagonist as "man is full of life" and wrote that he "calls up comparisons to the late John Updike's visited and revisited character, Rabbit. Embodying contemporary ennui, Rabbit considers himself fulfilled when he manages to merely 'muddle through.'" At Tablet, Alexander Aciman described the novel as "The Best Novel of 2017 That You Never Heard Of."
