= Phoning Home (book) =

2014 book by Jacob Appel

- First edition
- Author: Jacob Appel
- Language: English
- Genre: Essay collection; Autobiography
- Publisher: University of South Carolina Press
- Publication date: 2014
- Publication place: United States

Phoning Home is a collection of autobiographical essays by Jacob Appel, published in 2014 by the University of South Carolina Press. The collection won the New Haven Prize in 2014 and a finalist for the Housatonic Book Award in 2015.

Four of the essays were previously short-listed for The Best American Essays in the years 2007, 2011, 2012, and 2013. Essays in the collection had earlier been published in Massachusetts Review, Briar Cliff Review, Georgetown Review, Midstream, Tiferet, Southwest Review, Passages North, North Dakota Quarterly, Alligator Juniper, Southeast Review, Kenyon Review, CutBank and Chattahoochee Review.

== Reception ==
Girija Sankar, reviewing the volume for New Pages, wrote that "Phoning Home is a worthy addition to the pantheon of great American essays and Appel proves himself to be an astute observer and chronicler of the modern human condition." Bryan Monte in Amsterdam Quarterly wrote, "What makes Appel’s essays so interesting and unique is his candid, statistical or professional approach and/or non-melodramatic description of his relatives’ experience."

== Contents ==
- Phoning Home
- Two Cats, Fat & Thin
- Mr. Odd & Mr. Even
- An Absence of Jell-O
- She Loves Me Not
- Opting Out
- Charming & Devoted
- Livery
- The Man Who Was Not My Grandfather
- Caesura: Antwerp, 1938
- Our Incredible Shrinking Discourse
- Divided Expectations
- Sudden Death: A Eulogy
