= North Dakota Quarterly =

American literary journal

- Discipline: Literary journal
- Language: English
- Edited by: William Caraher

Publication details
- Former names: Quarterly Journal; Quarterly Journal of the University of North Dakota
- History: 1911-present, with a 30-year break prior to 1956
- Publisher: University of Nebraska Press for the University of North Dakota (United States)
- Frequency: Quarterly

Standard abbreviations
- ISO 4: N. D. Q.

Indexing
- ISSN: 0029-277X
- LCCN: 12001863
- OCLC no.: 01606908

Links
- Journal homepage; Online archive

North Dakota Quarterly (NDQ) is a literary journal published quarterly by the University of North Dakota. NDQ publishes poetry, fiction, interviews, and literary non-fiction. It was first published in 1911 as a vehicle for faculty papers. After a hiatus during the Depression, NDQ began publishing again with a broader focus that gradually came to include stories and poems. Preeminent Hemingway scholar Robert W. Lewis edited NDQ from 1982 until his death in 2013 and published about a dozen special editions focused on Hemingway, as well as a number of special editions focused on China, Yugoslavia, and Native American issues and literature. In 2019, NDQ began being published by the University of Nebraska Press.

== Contributors ==
- Louise Erdrich, poet, novelist, short story writer, winner of the National Book Award for Fiction for The Round House in 2012.
- Kathleen Norris, author of Dakota: A Spiritual Geography and a number of other non-fiction books.
- Ted Kooser, former U.S. Poet Laureate
- N. Scott Momaday, Pulitzer Prize winner
- Jacob M. Appel, short story writer
- Larry Woiwode, North Dakota Poet Laureate, novelist and short story writer
- Jimmy Carter, former United States President, published original poetry in 1992
- Thomas McGrath, celebrated American poet from North Dakota
- James Sallis, novelist, poet, and short story writer.

== Honors and awards ==
- Pushcart Prize in 2008 "Overwintering in Fairbanks," an essay by Erica Keiko Iseri that first appeared in NDQ
- O. Henry Award in 1993 for The Killing Blanket by Rilla Askew
- The Council of Editors of Learned Journals (CELJ), runner up in 1993 for best special issue, Out of Yugoslavia

== See also ==
- List of literary magazines
