= Einstein's Beach House =

Collection of short stories written by American author Jacob M. Appel

- First edition (publ. Press Gang Publishers)
- Author: Jacob M. Appel
- Language: English
- Publication date: 2014

Einstein's Beach House (2014) is the second collection of short stories by American author Jacob M. Appel. It won the Pressgang Prize in 2013 and was published by Butler University. The book was short-listed for the New England Book Award in 2015.

Among the stories in the collection, "Einstein's Beach House," which had previously appeared in The Sonora Review, was short-listed for The Best American Short Stories in 2015 and "Hue and Cry", had previously appeared in The Gettysburg Review, was named as one of the "100 Other Distinguished Stories of 2013" by The Best American Short Stories in 2014.

== Reception ==
Critic John Domini in The Brooklyn Rail wrote of the collection: “The dialog, even when one of the speakers wobbles on the verge of madness, shows bite and intelligence . . . The rambunctious serendipity recalls T.C. Boyle, as does the ability to turn on a dime, now cutthroat, now huggable.” In The North American Review, Anne M. Drolet wrote, “Appel captures the sounds, smells and feeling of human idiosyncracies, describing each person and place with layers of specifics and closely observed characters.”

== Contents ==
- Hue and Cry
- La Tristesse Des Hérissons
- Strings
- Limerence
- Einstein’s Beach House
- The Rod of Asclepius
- Sharing the Hostage
- Paracosmos
