= Elephant Rock Books =

Independent publisher based in Connecticut, US

Elephant Rock Books was an independent publishing company based in Connecticut from 2010-2023. The press was founded by Jotham Burrello in Chicago in 2010. Burrello decided to start the press while talking with his former teacher, Patricia Ann McNair, about her work; her book The Temple of the Air became Elephant Rock's first publication and went on to win positive reviews and several awards.

The publisher was backed by a multimedia company, Elephant Rock Productions, which handled accounting and banking.

== Books ==
Elephant Rock published The Biology of Luck by Jacob M. Appel which won the Independent Publisher Book Award for U.S. North-East, Best Regional Fiction in 2014.

Elephant Rock published Briefly Knocked Unconscious By A Low-Flying Duck, an essay anthology of the 2nd Story Collective that has won multiple literary prizes.

In 2014 the press moved into the young adult fiction market with Jessie Ann Foley's novel The Carnival at Bray, which was named a Printz Honor Book.

Elephant Rock published The Art of Holding On and Letting Go, a debut novel by Kristin Bartley Lenz that is a Junior Library Guild Selection and Great Lakes Great Books Award honor book from the Michigan Reading Association.

Other books published by the press: A Vacation on the Islands of Ex-Boyfriends by Stacy Bierlein, The Boy Who Really, Really Wanted to Have Sex: The Memoir of a Fat Kid by John McNally, and Borrowed by Lucia DiStefano.
