= The Biology of Luck =

2013 novel by Jacob M. Appel

- First edition (publ. Elephant Rock Books)
- Author: Jacob M. Appel
- Language: English
- Publication date: 2013

The Biology of Luck is a 2013 American novel by Jacob M. Appel. It is a reimagining of James Joyce's Ulysses and is set in New York City.

== Plot ==
The novel alternates between the adventures of "New York tour guide Larry Bloom", who works "a nine-to-five grind herding privileged tourists through the city", and chapters from a book manuscript he has written "about the light in his listless life, Starshine Hart, a 29-year-old, job-jumping beauty who attracts the gaze and adoration of nearly every man in the Tri-state area".

== Reception ==
Kate Duva of Word Riot wrote that Appel captures the essence of New York City and starts off well, but the large eccentric cast and lack of characterization for the main protagonists may leave some readers ambivalent. Will Donnelly of Green Mountains Review described the novel as "strange genius".

It won an Independent Publisher Book Award for U.S. North-East, Best Regional Fiction in 2014 and was short-listed for the Hoffer Society's Montaigne Medal.
