= Gerald B. Appel =

American nephrologist

Gerald Appel
- Born: 1947 (age 78–79)
- Education: Cornell University (BA); Yeshiva University (MD)
- Occupation: Nephrologist

Gerald B. Appel (born 1947) is an American medical doctor and kidney researcher known both for his celebrity patients and for his scholarly work on the renal manifestations of systemic lupus erythematosus and other diseases of the glomeruli, the filters of the kidney. He has also published more than three hundred academic papers and book chapters on diseases of the glomeruli.

At Columbia University he established the first center for glomerular diseases In the United States. Appel is currently professor of medicine and co-director of clinical nephrology at Columbia University Medical Center in New York City, where he also runs the Center for Glomerular Diseases. The National Kidney Foundation awarded Appel its lifetime achievement award in 2005, naming him "the foremost academic nephrologist of the past twenty-five years."

Appel gained widespread recognition during the early 2000s for his role in securing a kidney transplant for the professional basketball player Alonzo Mourning and for enabling Mourning to return to the court for an NBA championship. However, Appel had also treated numerous other celebrities, including a dying Charles Lindbergh in the mid-1970s and the late Chicago White Sox co-owner Eddie Einhorn at the time of that team's World Series victory in 2005. He also worked on former NFL star WR Donald Jones.

In addition to Appel's other achievements, he is an associate editor of the kidney disease section of Up To Date, a major online reference for nephrologists all over the world.

== Family life ==
He has published several academic papers with his wife, Alice Sue Appel, Ph.D.

He is the father of polymath Jacob M. Appel.
