= Detroit Repertory Theatre =

- DRT
- Interactive map of Detroit Repertory Theatre
- Location: 13103 Woodrow Wilson Street; Detroit, Michigan 48238
- Coordinates: 42°23′42″N 83°06′35″W
- Capacity: 194
- Type: Live theatre
- Designation: Small Professional Theatre (SPT)
- Parking: On-site, fenced-in

Construction
- Opened: 1953 (touring), 1963 (physical theatre)

Website
- www.detroitreptheatre.com

Detroit Repertory Theatre is a regional theatre located at 13103 Woodrow Wilson in Detroit, Michigan with a seating capacity of 194. It is Michigan's longest running, non-profit, professional (union) Theatre. The theatre began as a children's musical touring company in 1957 and performed throughout Michigan, Indiana, Ohio and Pennsylvania, before it established itself on Woodrow Wilson Avenue in Detroit in 1963. It survived the race riots of 1967 and has been over the nearly 60 years of its existence often the only fully professional non-profit theatre in Detroit. The theatre averages about 60,000 admissions each year.

Among the world premieres to open at Detroit Rep are Jacob M. Appel's Arborophilia in 2006 and Causa Mortis in 2009. William Roetzheim selected Appel's Causa Mortis for inclusion in Regional Best 2011 as one of the nine top plays to premiere at regional theaters during the 2009–10 season.

== History ==
Originating as a touring company that put on children's shows, the Detroit Repertory Theatre is Michigan's oldest professional theatre. Bruce Millan, former artistic director of the company, Rip (T.O. Andrus), Dee Andrus, and Barbara Busby founded the Detroit Repertory Theatre in 1957. From the years 1957 to 1963, the company toured all around the Midwest, putting on shows in states like Michigan, Indiana, Ohio, and Pennsylvania. Settling on Woodrow Wilson in the sixties, the company became a theatre rooted in its founding ideals, standing against social issues like racism, bigotry, and vilification. Enduring and surviving the 1967 race riots, the company forged ahead well into the seventies and developed an audience despite the poverty-stricken neighborhood. In the 1980s, with help from a grant from The Kresge Foundation, the theatre began renovations, upgrading the exterior and even building a new parking lot. Throughout the eighties and nineties, the company steadily increased its audience turnout, counting well over 150,000 tickets sold for a 194-seat theatre. Today, the company continues to have an 85% audience turnout and is currently planning a shift in leadership. Co-founder and artistic director Bruce Millan stepped down from the company in 2018 and has appointed Marketing and Development director Leah Smith as current artistic director. Detroit Repertory Theatre produces four shows a season with eight-week-long runs. The theatre also currently runs as an Actors' Equity Association Small Professional Theatre and owns two additional buildings for rehearsal, design, and construction purposes.

== Mission and outreach ==
Since its founding, the Detroit Repertory Theatre has committed to being a progressive company. Located in a neighborhood of Detroit, a largely black city, the theatre aims to portray its neighbors on stage. As early as their children's theatre days, the company has employed diverse casting techniques that were largely unpopular at the time. Despite disdain from some of the theatre's supporters, these techniques, including interracial casting as well as color and gender blind casting, aim to provide a more diverse and equitable experience for audiences and performers alike. The theatre has been known to produce shows with strong themes of social justice and change, such as The Living Text, a play about the Civil War and Reconstruction. The company also continues to nurture the neighborhood around it, working towards building the neighborhood back up through cultural and artistic means, working with local artists and businesses native to Detroit. Currently, the theatre six different outreach programs running, including a summer festival, charitable group fundraisers, an actor's workshop, cultural fellows, a new playwright's program, and a lobby gallery dedicated to Gilden Snowden.

== Production history ==
The 2019/2020 Season includes:

- Channel Cat by Joseph Zettelmaier
- The Puppeteer by Desiree York
- Rules for Active Shooters by Frankie Little Hardin
- Life on the Moon by Anna Tatelman

== Awards and acknowledgements ==
- The National AEA Rosetta LeNoire Award
- The Martin Luther King Jr. Legacy Award
- Wayne County Community Service Award
- Detroit Chapter of NOW
- Michigan Coalition for Human Rights Service Award
- Metro Times 20 Arts and Cultural Experiences You Must Have in Detroit
- Oakland Press
- The Governor's Arts Award
- Kennedy Center for Arts in Washington DC
- Howard University Alumni Award
- The Interfaith Leadership Council of Southeast Michigan
- The History and Humanities Award
- The Thank You Award
