= The Topless Widow of Herkimer Street =

First edition (publ. Howling Bird Press)

The Topless Widow of Herkimer Street (2016) is the sixth collection of short stories and ninth work of fiction by American author Jacob M. Appel. It was published by Howling Bird Press. The collection won the Howling Bird Prize for Fiction in 2016. The story was also awarded the Minnesota Book Award for 2016.

Stories in the collection had previously appeared in the Beloit Fiction Journal, Berkeley Fiction Review, Natural Bridge, The Seattle Review, North Dakota Quarterly, Florida Review, Prairie Schooner and other leading literary journals and had been shortlisted for the Best American Short Stories.

== Reception ==
Reviewer Anthony Bukowski in the Minnesota Star Tribune wrote that "these are insightful stories from a patient, careful observer of human nature." Kirkus described it as a collection that "offers well-constructed stories that sharply but compassionately observe people trying to make sense of life’s disruptions." Amelia Fisher in The Literary Review wrote, "The laughs are fresh, the characters vibrant, and the prose a polished delight. It is hard to imagine a more eclectic, funny, and genuinely touching collection of stories; and at the very least, it will illuminate the dangers of ordering a new house from a mail-order catalog, or joining a socialist’s boat-party in a hurricane."

== Contents ==
- The Current Occupant
- The Topless Widow of Herkimer Street
- Lessons in Platygaeanism
- Bioethics for Dunces
- The Wish
- Toward Uncharted Waters
- Rendezvous in Wikiternity
- Long Term
