= The Mistress of Wholesome =

The Mistress of Wholesome is a play by Jacob Appel that premiered at the Little Theatre of Alexandria on May 16, 2008.

The play was directed by Keith Waters and starred Kacie Greenwood, Danielle Y. Eure and Jung Weil. A second production at the OpenStage Theater in Pittsburgh won the Theatre League of Western Pennsylvania's top honors for 2008. The Pittsburgh Post-Gazette described the play as "quirky" yet "delectable". It recounts the story of a cardiologist's wife whose husband's mistress and the social worker vetting her for adopting a child arrive at her home on the same afternoon.

The play had previously been awarded the grand prize in the Writers Digest annual writing competition, the first stage play to win this award in seventy-seven years.
