= Open border =

Border that enables free movement of people between jurisdictions

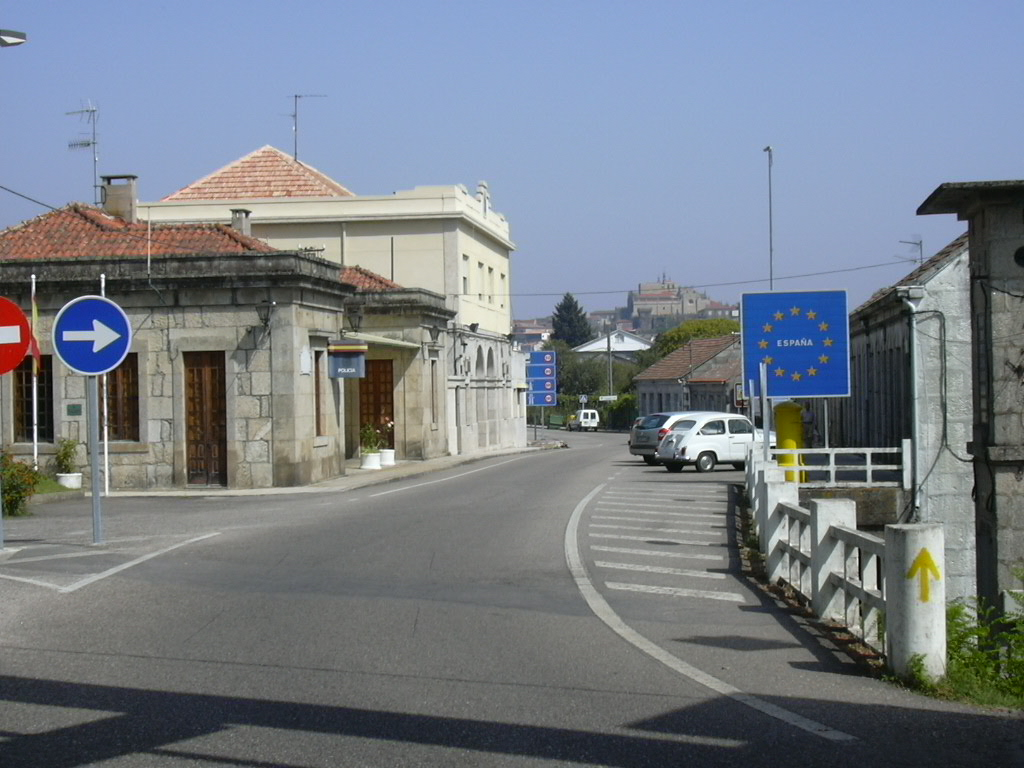
Border between Spain and Portugal, parties to the Schengen Agreement. Their border is marked with a simple sign and no passport checks or customs controls.

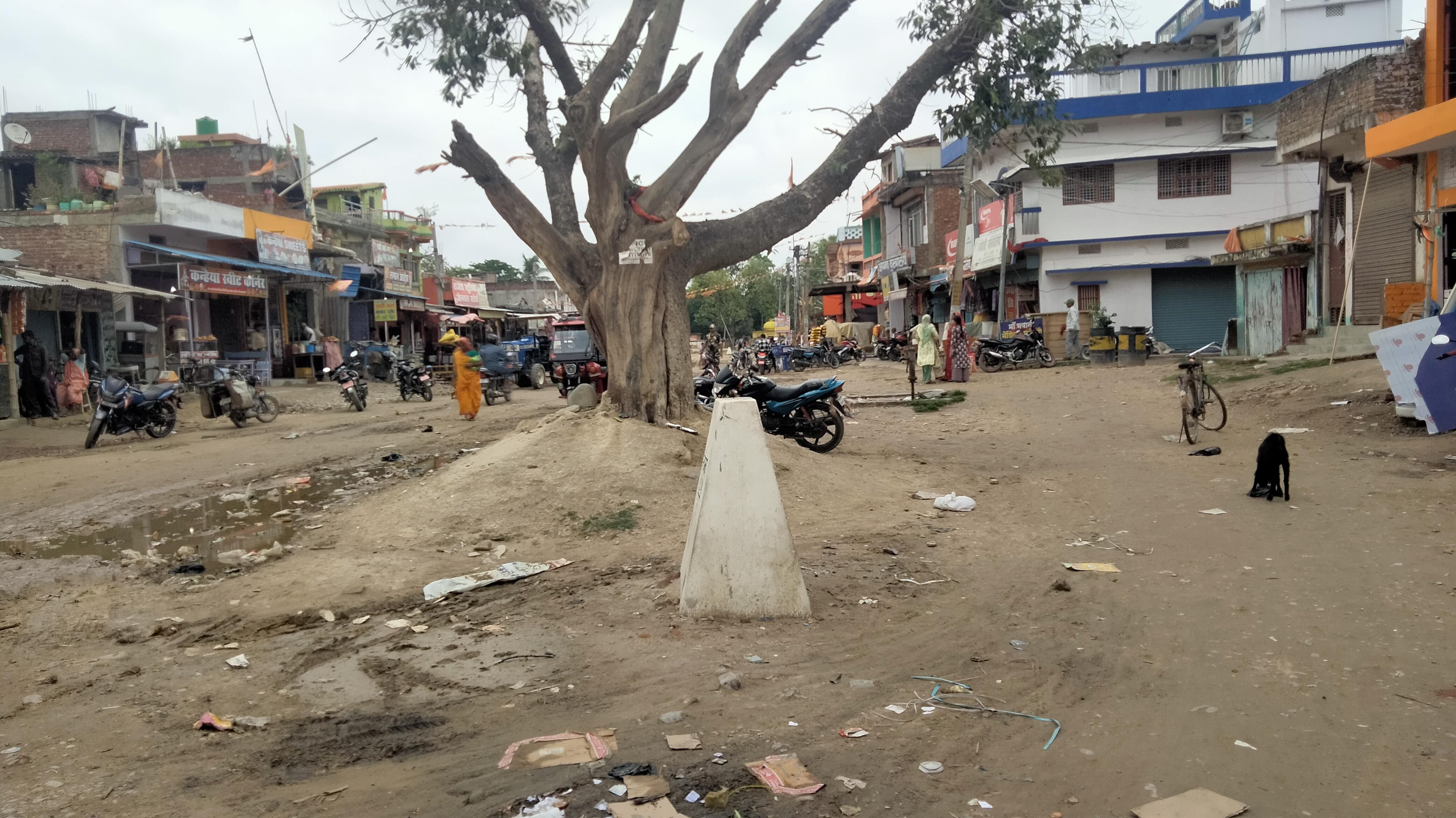
Open border known as Dasgaja between India and Nepal near the Gandhi Chowk at the Madhwapur-Matihani border

An open border is a border that enables free movement of people and often of goods between jurisdictions with no restrictions on movement and is lacking a border control. Generally, the term refers to international borders between sovereign states. A border may be open due to intentional legislation, allowing free movement of people across it (de jure), or due to a lack of legal controls, a lack of adequate enforcement or adequate supervision of the border (de facto). The Schengen Agreement between most members of the European Economic Area (EFTA and the EU) is an example of de jure open borders. The border between Bangladesh and India has been an example of a de facto open border, but it has become more controlled in recent years. The term "open borders" applies only to the flow of people, not the flow of goods and services, and only to borders between political jurisdictions, not to mere boundaries of privately owned property.

Open borders are the norm for borders between subdivisions within the boundaries of sovereign states, though some countries do maintain internal border controls (for example between the People's Republic of China mainland and the special administrative regions of Hong Kong and Macau, between the United States and the unincorporated territories of Guam, the Northern Mariana Islands and American Samoa, and the Minor Outlying Islands, or between North Korea's provinces and cities). Open borders are also usual between member states of federations, though (very rarely) movement between member states may be controlled in exceptional circumstances. (Note: For example, inter-state travel in Australia was restricted in 2020 due to the COVID-19 epidemic, for the first time since the 1918 flu pandemic.) Federations, confederations and similar multi-national unions typically maintain external border controls through a collective border control system, though they sometimes have open borders with other non-member states through special international agreements – such as between Schengen Agreement countries as mentioned above.

In the past, many states had open international borders either in practice or due to a lack of any legal restriction. Many authors, such as John Maynard Keynes, have identified the early 20th century and particularly World War I as the point when such controls became common.

There have been sporadic attempts to promote global open borders as a viable policy option. The participants in an 1889 International Emigration Conference in London affirmed “the right of the individual to the fundamental liberty accorded him by every civilised nation to come and go and dispose of his person and destinies as he pleases." Currently, immigration is more restricted and harder for low-skilled and low-income people.

== Types of borders ==
There are multiple types of national borders in use around the world. Some of these are:

A conditionally open border is a border that allows movement of people across the border that meet a special set of conditions. This special set of conditions which limits the application of border controls that would normally otherwise apply could be defined by an international agreement or international law, or the special conditions could be defined by a regulation or law of the jurisdiction that the people are claiming the right to enter. Conditionally open borders generally requires a claim to be submitted from the people who are proposing to enter the new jurisdiction stating why they meet the special conditions which allow entry into the new jurisdiction. The new jurisdiction may detain the people until their claim is approved for entry into the new jurisdiction, or they may release them into the new jurisdiction while their claim is being processed. Whenever a conditionally open border is allowed, a considerable effort is often required to ensure that border controls do not break down to such an extent that it becomes an open border situation. An example of a conditionally open border is a border of any country which allows movement of asylum seekers due to application of either the 1951 Refugee Convention or international law which allows people to cross a border to escape a situation where their lives are directly threatened or in significant danger. Another example is the border between Ireland and the United Kingdom. The two countries allow unrestricted movement of their own citizens, but in order to enjoy such movement across the Irish Sea, those same citizens may be required to provide evidence at seaports and airports that they are UK or Irish nationals. These checks are by the police, not immigration officers. (As of October 2018, there are no such controls on the highly porous land border between them).

A controlled border is a border that allows movement of people between different jurisdictions but places restrictions and sometimes significant restrictions on this movement. This type of border may require a person crossing this border to obtain a visa or in some cases may allow a short period of visa free travel in the new jurisdiction. A controlled border always has some method of documenting and recording people movements across the border for later tracking and checking compliance with any conditions associated with the visa or any other border crossing conditions. A controlled border places limitations on what a person crossing the border can do in the new jurisdiction, this is usually manifested in limitations on employment and also it limits the length of time the person can legally remain in the new jurisdiction. A controlled border often requires some type of barrier, such as a river, ocean or fence to ensure that the border controls are not bypassed so that any people wishing to cross the border are directed to authorized border crossing points where any border crossing conditions can be properly monitored. Given the large scale movement of people today for work, holidays, study and other reasons a controlled border also requires internal checks and internal enforcement within the jurisdiction to ensure that any people who have entered the jurisdiction are in fact complying with any border crossing conditions and that they are not overstaying to reside illegally or as an undocumented resident. Most international borders are by legislative intent of the controlled border type. However, where there is a lack of adequate internal enforcement or where the borders are land borders, the border is often controlled only on part of the border, while other parts of the border may remain open to such an extent that it may be considered an open border due to lack of supervision and enforcement.

A closed border is a border that prevents movement of people between different jurisdictions with limited or no exceptions associated with this movement. These borders normally have fences or walls in which any gates or border crossings are closed and if these border gates are opened they generally only allow movement of people in exceptional circumstances. Perhaps the most famous example of an extant closed border is the Demilitarized Zone between North Korea and South Korea. The Berlin Wall could also have been called a closed border.

Borders can be open or and closed based on: entry status, entry duration, entry qualifications, entrant rights and obligations, and entry quotas. Entry status refers to the occupation of someone when and if they are allowed to cross a border, whether they are a student, worker, soldier, immigrant. One's status effects the chances of being permitted to cross a border. "Most states control border crossing by limiting the duration of any visit." Entry qualifications are restrictions based on factors such as health, age, income, religion, race. "Many countries, including Canada and Singapore, will admit wealthy immigrants who can demonstrate an intention and capacity to invest in the country." Entrants rights and obligations are the restrictions that will be placed on those who have already been permitted to cross a border: you must follow certain rules and regulations given by the government to be allowed to stay in that country. A government may allow you to take up residency but may not allow you to work, and those who are allowed to work may not be able to find work due to the restrictions and forms of employment allowed. Entry quotas are restrictions based on the number of immigrants allowed across a border within a certain frame of time: if you meet all of the qualifications to cross a border, but the country you want to enter has already met its quota for allowing immigrants inside, you may still not be allowed to enter.

As seen from the examples below, there are differing degrees of "openness" of a border, the nature of which depends on whether or not there are physical passport controls in place (and enforced). Passport control by police or immigration officers may be in place on some kinds of border but citizens of the destination territory or participating territories are permitted to cross using at most an identity card without any further approval, restrictions or conditions. Examples of the most open type of border include the Schengen zone or the [UK/Ireland] Common Travel Area, where transit across the inter-state frontiers are entirely uncontrolled, (Note: As of November 2018, because of illegal onward migration from Africa and Asia, identity checks are being enforced at Italy's borders with France, Switzerland and Austria.) and third-country illegal immigration is controlled by internal policing as with any other kind of clandestine entry. Examples of near-open borders include the border between Ireland, in the Common Travel Area (on the one hand) and the Schengen Zone (on the other) which, despite having full passport control, is an internal EU border that EU citizens can pass freely without any conditions, other than an identity card. Non-EU nationals are subject to full passport and visa control measures at airports and some seaports. A hybrid of these two possibilities is the border between Russia and Belarus in the Union State which lacks any physical control but formally foreigners are not permitted to use an uncontrolled crossing.

== Scientific assessments of the effects ==
A literature summary by Michael Clemens estimates that open borders would result in an increase of 67–147% in GWP (gross world product), with a median estimate of a doubling of world GDP. One estimate placed the economic benefits at 78 trillion. This increase in GWP would occur primarily because open borders allow workers to go to businesses that can pay them more, and these businesses can pay them more because they help their workers to be more productive.

Adam James Tebble argues that more open borders aid both the economic and institutional development of poorer migrant sending countries, contrary to proponents of "brain-drain" critiques of migration. Because migrants from developing countries often earn higher wages after moving to a more developed country, they often also send remittances to relatives in their home country to an extent which sometimes negates the originally harmful effect of them leaving. (see Human capital flight for more).

Philippe Legrain argues that the countries of the world need migration to help global trade and reduce the occurrence of regional wars. Legrain further argues that due to the productivity gap between countries in the Global North and the Global South, open migration would significantly benefit the world economy. Since richer countries generally have better industrial capital and technology, by allowing migrants from the Global South to access these resources, it would narrow the productivity gap, resulting not only in an increase of economic gains but also in a better distribution of profit.

Bryan Caplan has argued that, in the U.S., increasing immigration with the current ratio of high- and low-skilled workers would have a net positive fiscal impact. He states that a truly open borders policy would result in an altered ratio of low- and high-skilled workers where the productivity effect of immigration negates the negative fiscal impact of older low-skilled migrants. In addition to that, Caplan argued that native-born populations also have a larger fiscal burden than comparable immigrants (partially because immigrants are usually already working and taxpaying age).

== Political debate and opinions ==
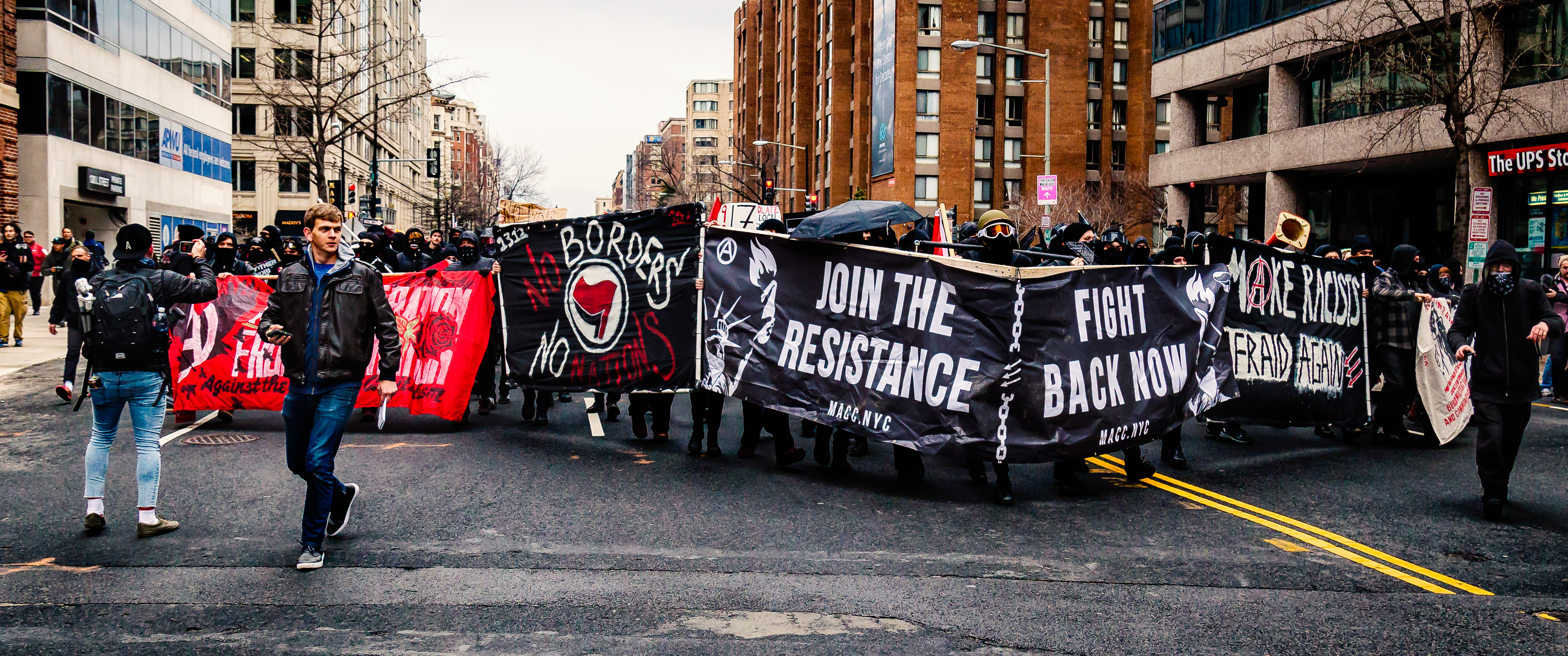
Anarchists protesting against borders with banner reading "No border, no nations"

The modern debate around open borders is not clearly delineated into the traditional left–right political spectrum and party identification can be quite mobile based on the issue of immigration, but in the United States, visible stances and differences between parties based solely on immigration and open borders became apparent after the Hart-Cellar Act of 1965. Libertarians generally support unrestricted immigration, while nativists like Donald Trump oppose it. Similarly, some figures on the left wing, like democratic socialist Bernie Sanders reject open border policies, although others support open borders. In addition, the population of the Democratic Party has shifted from a massive white majority to almost an even split with non-white citizens since 1980, which has led some members of the Democratic Party to shift more towards the political right, and until then both political parties had been more or less aligned regarding immigration. The dividing line accords more closely with the libertarian-authoritarian political spectrum.

It has been proposed that borders between the North American Free Trade Agreement (NAFTA) countries be opened. If goods and services and corporations can cross international boundaries without restraint, it is argued, then it does not make sense to restrain on the flow of people who work to make those goods and services. Some estimate that open borders where people are free to move and find work could result in 78 trillion dollars in economic gains.

Those in favour of a global migration policy advocate the adoption of a migratory regulatory system and new criteria to better guaranteed all rights (civil, social and political) for all immigrants. It is necessary to expand migration policy to create better management of global migratory system. Some propose a new meaning and understanding of global citizenship to establish a border global migration system. Migration is under the control and management of local governments and officials, but it is both a domestic political issue, and a global issue which needs joint efforts from different countries.

A 2025 opinion poll shows that the majority of U.S. voters prefer secure borders over open borders.

=== Arguments for open borders ===
Free migration is seen by some as complement to Article 13 of the Universal Declaration on Human Rights: (1) Everyone has the right to freedom of movement and residence within the borders of each state. (2) Everyone has the right to leave any country, including his own, and to return to his country. Some suggest that there is a much longer tradition supporting freedom to travel and settle abroad, one that dates back to antiquity and flourished particularly strongly in the 16th to 18th centuries.

Joseph Carens argues that the social inequality imposed by closed borders is so great it outweighs any challenges to their political or economic feasibility. He argues we should open borders based on the same reasons we reject the feudal system: both are legal systems which afford privilege based on the luck of birthright and maintain inequality by limiting the lower socioeconomic status groups' freedom to move. Carens argues for a critical approach to the current border system as a step towards collective change. He acknowledges that critiques are not the equivalent of a perfect roadmap to establish open borders. However, further utilizing his comparison with feudalism, he explains that while in the past it seemed impossible to overcome such a system now looking back, approaching the system critically was one of the many necessary steps towards change.

Jacob M. Appel has argued that "treating human beings differently, simply because they were born on the opposite side of a national boundary," is inherently unethical. According to Appel, such "birthrights" are only defensible if they serve "useful and meaningful social purposes" (such as inheritance rights, which encourage mothers and fathers to work and save for their children), but the "birthright of nationality" does not do so. Restrictions on mobility can only be justified if it can be shown that those restrictions prevent significant harm. Since research indicates that open borders will be better for both the natives and the migrants, and at the very least have not been shown to cause major harm, those restrictions are unjustified. The remote control methods used to keep hopeful immigrants out of wealthy nations (such as visa programs, flood lights at borders, or barbed wire fencing for example) slow down the avenues of legal migration and make other avenues of seeking asylum a more perilous endeavor.

Open borders would help save the lives of people who would otherwise have to wait for countries to decide the fate of refugees. As stated by Sasha Polakow-Suransky, countries have enough to care for their citizens and others. Caplan has also shared that not doing anything and being a bystander is just as harmful to refugees. It is estimated that open borders would allow people to be safe. Refugees who are in danger flee to Western countries which have provided safety and comfort. David Miliband argues that having open borders will rescue the lives of migrants who are constantly struggling to survive in inhabitable areas. According to him, accepting migrants into Western countries shows the acceptance for those in need and expresses that support and guidance is essential to saving the lives of innocent people.

According to Chandran Kukathas, immigration control is a threat to freedom and national self-determination. He argues, "immigration control is not merely about preventing outsiders from moving across borders. It is about controlling what outsiders do once in a society: whether they work, reside, study, set up businesses, or share their lives with others. But controlling outsiders-immigrants or would-be immigrants-requires regulating, monitoring, and sanctioning insiders, those citizens and residents who might otherwise hire, trade with, house, teach, or generally associate with outsiders."

Open borders cannot be dismissed as merely a utopian idea, argues Harald Bauder, because they do not propose an alternative way to organize human society but rather are a critique of closed or controlled borders. This critique, however, invites the search for practical as well as radical solutions to the problematic consequences of contemporary migration practices, including the deaths of migrants in the Mediterranean Sea, the US–Mexico border, and elsewhere. Bauder takes a more pragmatic approach as he hypothetically explores what an open border world would look like. Since open borders would allow for free movement but would not necessarily prevent discrimination on the basis of status, he first argues that the key to a just world with open borders is access to citizenship for all persons within a territory. By looking at different basis for citizenship, he explains that granting citizenship solely based on place of residence, independent of any other factors, would be a step towards a world where cross-border mobility doesn’t result in unfair and unequal treatment.

According to Jeffrey Miron: "Immigrants presumably benefit from immigrating. That should count in evaluating immigration policy. It is arbitrary that some people or their ancestors were lucky enough to have already migrated to a better country."

=== Arguments against open borders ===
Controlled borders restrict migration by non-citizens. Several arguments for controlled borders and against open borders are as follows:

Controlled borders encourage responsible policies in relation to population and birth rates for countries by preventing high population and high birth rate countries from disgorging their people onto other low population and low birth rate countries.

Large-scale immigration from poorer countries into richer countries can create a "brain drain" in the source country, where educated professionals leave their home country to live elsewhere, depriving their home countries of an educated workforce. For example, in 2010 there were more Ethiopian doctors living in Chicago than there were in Ethiopia itself.

In the United States, it has been argued that it may cause increased backlash from the white population who carry 75 percent (but decreasing) of the political vote. This backlash includes preventing immigrants access to basic forms of governmental or community support as well as the creation of policies that specifically criminalize immigrants. This trend is based on studies demonstrating the more the Democratic Party shows positivity towards immigration, the more the white vote shifts towards conservative Republicans who support more restrictive immigration policies.

The influx of low-skill immigrant labor that open borders would bring into higher-skilled economies like the United States is feared to cause the standard for the average worker to decrease. Progressives such as Senator Bernie Sanders reject open borders as a loss for the American worker. Additionally, economic models that resemble the Nordic System operate in a way that rewards high-skilled work and seeks to avoid bolstering domestic and low-skill work that would make employment more accessible to refugees.

Some, such as Reihan Salam, have argued that low-skilled immigrants in the U.S. have formed a racialized class distinct from Americans, and that the implementation of open borders will create and deepen a cultural and economic clash in America due to differing ideals and values. Fear of losing traditional values has also been a contributing factor to the rise of the populist parties, which are greatly concerned with the social, cultural, and ethnic conservation of the majority, but the need to keep a certain ethnicity as the majority has spawned anti-immigrant beliefs within particular parties; thus, it has been observed that some populist party's views depict immigration as a negative, even as widespread immigration causes the composition of the population to change, due to the ethnic differences that immigrants bring.

== Examples of open borders ==
=== Svalbard ===
Uniquely, the Norwegian special territory of Svalbard is an entirely visa-free zone. No person requires a visa or residence permit and anyone may live and work in Svalbard indefinitely, regardless of citizenship. The Svalbard Treaty grants treaty nationals equal right of abode as Norwegian nationals. So far, non-treaty nationals have been admitted visa-free as well. "Regulations concerning rejection and expulsion from Svalbard" are in force on a non-discriminatory basis. Grounds for exclusion include lack of means of support, and violation of laws or regulations. Same-day visa-free transit at Oslo Airport is possible when travelling on non-stop flights to Svalbard.

=== List of groups of states with common open borders ===
Agreement	Since	States	Map	Notes
Schengen Agreement and microstates with open borders	1995	Andorra; Austria (Note: Austria, Denmark, France, Germany, Norway, and Sweden temporarily imposed controls on their borders due to the 2015 European migrant crisis.); Belgium; Bulgaria; Croatia; Czech Republic; Denmark; Estonia; Finland; France; Germany; Gibraltar; Greece; Hungary; Iceland; Italy; Latvia; Liechtenstein Lithuania Luxembourg; Malta; Netherlands; Monaco; Norway; Poland; Portugal; Romania; San Marino; Slovakia; Slovenia; Spain; Sweden; Switzerland; Vatican City		Most European Union (EU) and European Free Trade Association (EFTA) nations share open inter-state borders as part of the Schengen Agreement, allowing free flow of people between nations: controls on entry to the entire Schengen area are carried out at the first country of entry. As of 2025, Cyprus and Ireland are members of the EU but not full parties to the Schengen Agreement. Border controls persist for travel between the Schengen area and the British–Irish 'Common Travel Area' (see below), though these are relatively lightweight for EU/EFTA/Swiss citizens. In each case, there are more exacting entry restrictions on travellers who are not in these categories. Andorra, Monaco, San Marino, and the Vatican City are de facto Schengen states (officially not members but have no border control on the border with their respective enclaving states).
Nordic Passport Union	1952	Denmark; Finland; Iceland Norway; Sweden		The Nordic Passport Union is one of the earliest open border agreements. Denmark, Finland, Iceland, Norway, and Sweden allows citizens of the Nordic countries to travel and reside in another Nordic country (and Svalbard) without any travel documentation (e.g. a passport or national identity card) or a residence permit. Since 25 March 2001, these five states have also been part of the Schengen Area. However, citizens of the Nordic Passport Union countries enjoy extra rights within the Nordic area, not available under Schengen, such as less paperwork if moving to a different Nordic country, and fewer requirements for naturalization or citizenship. Within the Nordic area, any Nordic identity documentation (e.g. a driving license) is valid as proof of identity for Nordic citizens because of the Nordic Passport Union, while a national identity card or a passport can be required in other Schengen countries. The Faroe Islands are part of the Nordic Passport Union but not the Schengen Area, while Greenland and Svalbard are outside both. However, Greenland has an open border with all Nordic countries, and allows Nordic citizens to enter, settle and work without requiring a passport or permits.
Common Travel Area	1923	Ireland United Kingdom		Ireland and the United Kingdom (together with the Crown Dependencies of Jersey, Guernsey and Isle of Man, on behalf of which the UK is responsible for foreign affairs) share open borders under the Common Travel Area arrangement, allowing their citizens unrestricted freedom of movement in both countries (and dependencies) without any need for identity documents (other than as routinely required for air travel). Controls on entry to the entire Common Travel Area are carried out at the first country of entry. The Northern Ireland Protocol commits the UK to maintaining an open border in Ireland. Foreign nationals can also freely travel within the Common Travel Area, however they need a valid visa for the country they visit.
Union State	1996	Belarus Russia		Belarus and Russia share open borders, allowing their citizens unrestricted freedom of movement in both countries without any border checking. From 11 January 2025 foreigners can travel between Russia and Belarus only at certain border crossings with a valid passport and with a visa from one of the countries.
Indo-Bhutan Treaty of Peace and Friendship and Indo-Nepal Treaty of Peace and Friendship	1950	Bhutan; India; Nepal		Bhutan, India and Nepal share open borders, allowing their citizens unrestricted freedom of movement in all member countries. However, this open border is controlled for foreigners' entry or exit.
CA4 Border Control Agreement	2006	El Salvador; Guatemala Honduras; Nicaragua		The CA4 Border Control Agreement acts similarly to the Schengen Agreement, with full freedom of movement for citizens of the countries and foreign nationals. However, foreign nationals travelling by air must obtain the necessary permits and undergo checks at border checkpoints.
Andean Community	2007	Bolivia; Colombia Ecuador; Peru		Bolivia, Colombia, Ecuador, and Peru share open borders under the arrangement, allowing their citizens unrestricted freedom of movement in these countries without any need for identity documents (other than as routinely required for air travel). Controls on entry to the entire Andean Community are carried out at the first country of entry.
Mercosur	1991	Argentina; Brazil Paraguay; Uruguay		Argentina, Brazil, Paraguay, and Uruguay share open borders under the arrangement, allowing their citizens unrestricted freedom of movement in all member countries without any need for identity documents (other than as routinely required for air travel). Controls on entry to the entire Mercosur Community are carried out at the first country of entry.
CARICOM Single Market and Economy	2009	Antigua and Barbuda; Barbados; Belize; Dominica; Grenada; Guyana; Jamaica; Saint Kitts and Nevis Saint Lucia; Saint Vincent and the Grenadines; Suriname; Trinidad and Tobago		Antigua and Barbuda, Bahamas, Barbados, Belize, Dominica, Grenada, Guyana, Haiti, Jamaica, Montserrat, Saint Kitts and Nevis, Saint Lucia, Saint Vincent and Grenadines, Suriname, and Trinidad and Tobago share open borders under the arrangement, allowing their citizens unrestricted freedom of movement in both countries without any need for identity documents (other than as routinely required for air travel). Controls on entry to the entire CARICOM are carried out at the first country of entry.
Gulf Cooperation Council	1981	Bahrain; Kuwait; Oman Qatar; Saudi Arabia; United Arab Emirates		Bahrain, Kuwait, Oman, Qatar, Saudi Arabia, and United Arab Emirates share open borders under the Gulf Cooperation Council arrangement, allowing their citizens unrestricted freedom of movement in both countries without any need for identity documents. Controls on entry to the entire GCC are carried out at the first country of entry.
East African Community	2000	Burundi; Kenya; Rwanda; Democratic Republic of the Congo South Sudan; Tanzania; Uganda		The Democratic Republic of the Congo, Burundi, Kenya, Rwanda, South Sudan, Tanzania, and Uganda share open borders under the East African Community arrangement, allowing their citizens unrestricted freedom of movement in EAC member states. As recently as January 2018, there have still been difficulties in the open borders agreement due to tariff disputes between member states.
Trans-Tasman Travel Arrangement	1973	Australia; New Zealand		While both countries still have passport requirements, there is a degree of free travel between the two countries. Additionally, most New Zealand citizens in Australia are granted a Special Category Visa on arrival, allowing them to reside, travel and work in Australia. This is the only such agreement involving Australia or New Zealand.

== Examples of controlled borders ==
- The border between the United States and Mexico is controlled. This border is the most frequently crossed controlled international boundary in the world, with approximately 350 million legal crossings being made annually.
- Bangladesh and India share a border—which India is in the process of turning into a controlled border by the completion of a full border fence between the two countries to control the flow of people and prevent illegal migration.
- Entry into any of the U.S. minor outlying Islands requires permission from United States Armed Forces, and entry to the territory of American Samoa for US citizens requires a return ticket.

== Examples of closed borders ==
- North Korea and South Korea share a militarized border, known as the Military Demarcation Line, which has been in operation since the suspension of the Korean War in July 1953 (when the Korean Armistice Agreement established the Korean Demilitarized Zone near 38° N). The strip of land along the border has many landmines and movement detection equipment. There are two Border Crossings (one road, one rail) between North and South Korea but are mostly closed though they are opened from time to time with strict restrictions.
- The Armenia–Azerbaijan border has been closed since 1991.
- Turkey closed its border with Armenia in April 1993, out of solidarity for Azerbaijan in the Nagorno-Karabakh conflict. However, as of 2023, Turkey has opened its borders with Armenia for direct air cargo flights.
- The border between Ukraine and Moldova at Transnistria was closed to Russian male citizens since 2022, and closed completely since 2024.
- The land border between Algeria and Morocco has been completely closed since 1994. Since 2021, the airspace between the two countries has been closed at the initiative of Algeria.
- The Central African Republic's state of civil war has caused Chad to close all land borders between the two countries. On 22 May 2024, the Wagner Group coordinated discussions to reopen the border between the two countries.
- The Israel–Lebanon border is closed due to the hostilities between Israel and Lebanon.
- The Israel–Syria border is closed due to the hostilities between Israel and Syria, but there have been some legal crossings.
- The Egypt–Gaza border has been closed by Egypt after Israel's seizure of the only crossing along the border.
- Since its invasion by Russia, Ukraine closed its border with Russia and its border with Belarus completely.
- In April 2024, Finland closed its border with Russia indefinitely.
- The Georgia–South Ossetia border is closed.
- From June 2017–January 2021, Saudi Arabia temporarily closed its border with fellow Gulf Cooperation Council member Qatar, due to the 2017–21 Qatar diplomatic crisis.

== See also ==
- National security
