= Mask of Sanity (novel) =

2017 book by Jacob M. Appel

The Mask of Sanity
- Author: Jacob M. Appel
- Language: English
- Publisher: The Permanent Press
- Publication date: March 2017
- Publication place: United States
- ISBN: 978-1-57962-495-8

The Mask of Sanity is an American novel by Jacob M. Appel, published by The Permanent Press in 2017. The novel was a finalist for the Faulkner-Wisdom Prize and the runner up for Killer Nashville's Claymore Award.

== Plot ==
Dr. Jeremy Balint is an up-and-coming cardiologist who discovers that his wife Amanda is having an affair with his fellow physician Warren Sugarman. He is also a high-functioning sociopath. Balint plots to murder Sugarman and to disguise the murder as the work of a serial killer.

== Reception ==
Bruce DeSilva in The Washington Post described the novel as "both a suspenseful yarn and a chilling portrait of the mind of a high-functioning sociopath." Publishers Weekly praised the novel's "matter-of-fact, nonjudgmental prose" and described the volume as "deeply unsettling." Kirkus Reviews called it "Intelligent and chilling." Reviewing the novel in Amsterdam Quarterly, Bryan Monte wrote "The Mask of Sanity is full of surprises and will keep the reader wondering if Balint will be caught all the way to the very end of the story."
