= Arborophilia =

American political comedy play

Arborophilia is a play by Jacob M. Appel, about a woman whose daughters have both vexed her in love: one is dating a Republican and the other has fallen in love with a poplar tree.

The play was first produced at Detroit Repertory Theatre from November 2006 to January 2007. The production was directed by Bruce E. Millan. Henrietta Hermelin, best known for her role as an elderly blind woman in June August's comedy Coming to Life, portrayed Dame Lucretia Bankmore, the elderly real estate mogul bent upon chopping down the poplar, and was nominated for a Wilde Award for Best Supporting Actress. Michael Joseph also returned to the Detroit Rep, where he'd previously delivered an award-winning performance as the poet Langston Hughes in Hannibal of the Alps. Other notable performers included veteran regional actors Leah Smith and Annie Cross. Imani Turner made her Michigan debut as the tree-struck daughter.

The Detroit Free Press described the play as "fanciful" and "sharply funny." Donald Calamia in Detroit Pride Source called the play an "insightful poke at many of our cherished beliefs and institutions."

The Michigan Theater Association named Arborophilia its play of the year for 2006.
