= Libertarian perspectives on immigration =

The libertarian perspective on immigration is often regarded as one of the core concepts of libertarian theory and philosophy. There is considerable disagreement among libertarians as to what stance towards immigration best accords with libertarian principles. Some hold that restrictions on immigration are an infringement of the rights of immigrants and other property owners and constitute a threat to individual liberty. Others maintain that open borders amount to a policy of forced integration on the part of the state, and that protecting the rights of property holders requires that present governments adopt much more discriminatory policies on who is allowed to enter a country.

== Libertarian proponents of free immigration ==
Samuel Edward Konkin III has promoted illegal immigration as being a key part of the counter-economy.

Economist and libertarian theorist Walter Block argues that restrictions on immigration are incompatible with libertarianism. In his view, state-enforced national boundaries are arbitrary and violently imposed, and so therefore can provide no justification for restricting the movement of immigrants or emigrants. In accordance with libertarian principles, Block holds that immigration must be permitted insofar as it does not imply aggression. Where there is a property owner willing to take in an immigrant, third parties have no grounds for complaint.

Block further argues that imperfect present conditions of state-imposed migration barriers do not give license to libertarians to oppose open immigration. He holds that libertarians should not try to approximate what would be the case in a libertarian society, but should rather advocate those policies that accord directly with the non-aggression principle. This implies opposing state enforced immigration barriers and returning to property owners the right to decide who may or may not enter their territory. Block also holds that arguments to the effect that immigration would erode national institutions or culture are indefensible on libertarian grounds. If neither of these effects of immigration involve the physical invasion of property, then in Block's view, libertarians are unjustified in meeting peaceful immigrants with force.

Libertarian author Jacob Hornberger, a proponent of freer immigration policies, argues that open borders is the only libertarian immigration position.

The libertarian Cato Institute has been arguing in favor of liberalized immigration for over forty years and often criticizes the current system as antiquated, unfair and often maliciously conceived.

Political philosopher Adam James Tebble argues that more open borders aid both the economic and institutional development of poorer migrant sending countries, contrary to "brain-drain" critiques of migration.

== Libertarian proponents of restricted immigration ==
Libertarian theorist and economist Murray Rothbard approached the question of immigration through the lens of private property. In The Ethics of Liberty, Rothbard argued that the question of immigration could be adequately resolved within a libertarian society, where all streets and land would be privately owned. Immigration would be permitted and encouraged to the extent that there were property owners willing to receive immigrants and allow them to travel on their private roads. Rothbard believed this would lead to a varied arrangement of migration, reflecting the attitudes and desires of property owners in a given area.

Rothbard's views on immigration evolved later in his career, as he argued more pointedly that the anarcho-capitalist model would not lend itself to unrestricted immigration. He argued that policies of open immigration enforced by the state are antithetical to liberty:

"A totally privatized country would be as 'closed' as the particular inhabitants and property owners desire. It seems clear, then, that the regime of open borders that exists de facto in the U.S. really amounts to a compulsory opening by the central state, the state in charge of all streets and public land areas, and does not genuinely reflect the wishes of the proprietors."

Hans-Hermann Hoppe, a student of Rothbard and another influential libertarian thinker and economist, is well known for his criticism of unrestricted immigration. He argues that there is no inconsistency in advocating for free trade of good while at the same time arguing for policies of restricted immigration. In his view, free trade always implies a willing buyer and a willing seller. This is not the case with immigration, where immigrants can move on public roads of their own volition and to places where they are not necessarily welcome, amounting to forced integration. As Hoppe states in his article "The Case for Free Trade and Restricted Immigration", "It is precisely the absolute voluntariness of human association and separation—the absence of any form of forced integration—which makes peaceful relationships—free trade—between racially, ethnically, linguistically, religiously, or culturally distinct people possible." Moreover, Hoppe stresses that the political climate in the Western democracies has made the situation even more dire, as the welfare policies of these countries imply that immigration will lead to economic devastation. Hoppe agrees with Rothbard that the ultimate solution to the problem of immigration must be the abolition of government and privatization of all property, including the roads by which immigrants enter a nation and move about within it. This implies that every immigrant will be received by a willing property owner, thus making forced integration impossible. With regards to the anarcho-capitalist model, Hoppe says

"Clearly, under this scenario there exists no such thing as freedom of immigration. Rather, there exists the freedom of many independent private property owners to admit or exclude others from their own property in accordance with their own unrestricted or restricted property titles [...] There will be as much immigration or non-immigration, inclusivity or exclusivity, desegregation or segregation, non-discrimination or discrimination based on racial, ethnic, linguistic, religious, cultural or whatever other grounds as individual owners or associations of individual owners allow."

Even if the current situation of democratic central states does not approximate the anarcho-capitalist ideal, Hoppe still thinks that one can still advocate for policies that align more closely with libertarianism. He holds that democratic rulers should set policies as though they owned personally the territory over which they preside. This entails strong discrimination along the lines of "skill, character, and cultural compatibility" as the rulers try to maximize the value of their territory. Further, as Hoppe says, this model entails "requiring as necessary, for resident alien status as well as for citizenship, the personal sponsorship by a resident citizen and his assumption of liability for all property damage caused by the immigrant."
