= Miracles and Conundrums of the Secondary Planets =

Collection of short stories by Jacob M. Appel

First edition (publ. Black Lawrence Press)

Miracles and Conundrums of the Secondary Planets (2015) is the fourth collection of short stories by American author Jacob M. Appel. The collection won the Mid-Atlantic Book Award for Fiction in 2016.

Among the stories in the collection, "Phoebe with Impending Frost," which had previously appeared in The Southwest Review, won the 2009 McGinnis-Ritchie Award for Fiction and "Shell Game with Organs" won the 1998 Boston Review Short Fiction Prize.

== Reception ==
In the San Diego Book Review, Hubert O'Hearn described the collection as "delightful, smart and above all witty." Justin Goodman at Boston Accent Lit wrote of the collection, "What is uniquely compelling about Miracles and Conundrums is the pervasive sense of uncertainty that resonates throughout with the power of an agoraphobic’s first half-step out the house." Jason Hess at New Pages wrote of the stories: "They sometimes feature bizarre, fantastic details—a man grapples with the real possibility of his mistresses’ impending resurrection, a global cold snap rattles our understanding of global warming—but these features never distract from the human stories at the center of every tale." The book received a star from Kirkus Reviews, which described it as "a fine collection of memorable stories with a delicately surreal edge." Another reviewer, Jacqueline Grima at Humanity Hallows, wrote, "Jacob M Appel has a very special gift for storytelling, both his characters and their settings possessing a magical quality that brings them to life on the page. Exploring different lifetimes, parallel universes and, even, other planets, in Miracles and Conundrums of the Secondary Planets, Appel successfully pulls his reader into each and every one of his worlds, his characters and the dilemmas they face lingering long after their stories are finished."

== Contents ==
- Miracles and Conundrums of the Secondary Planets
- Phoebe with Impending Frost
- Invasive Species
- The Resurrection Bakeoff
- The Orchard
- The Grand Concourse
- Measures of Sorrow
- Shell Game with Organs
