= Jacob M. Appel =

American author, bioethicist, physician, lawyer and social critic

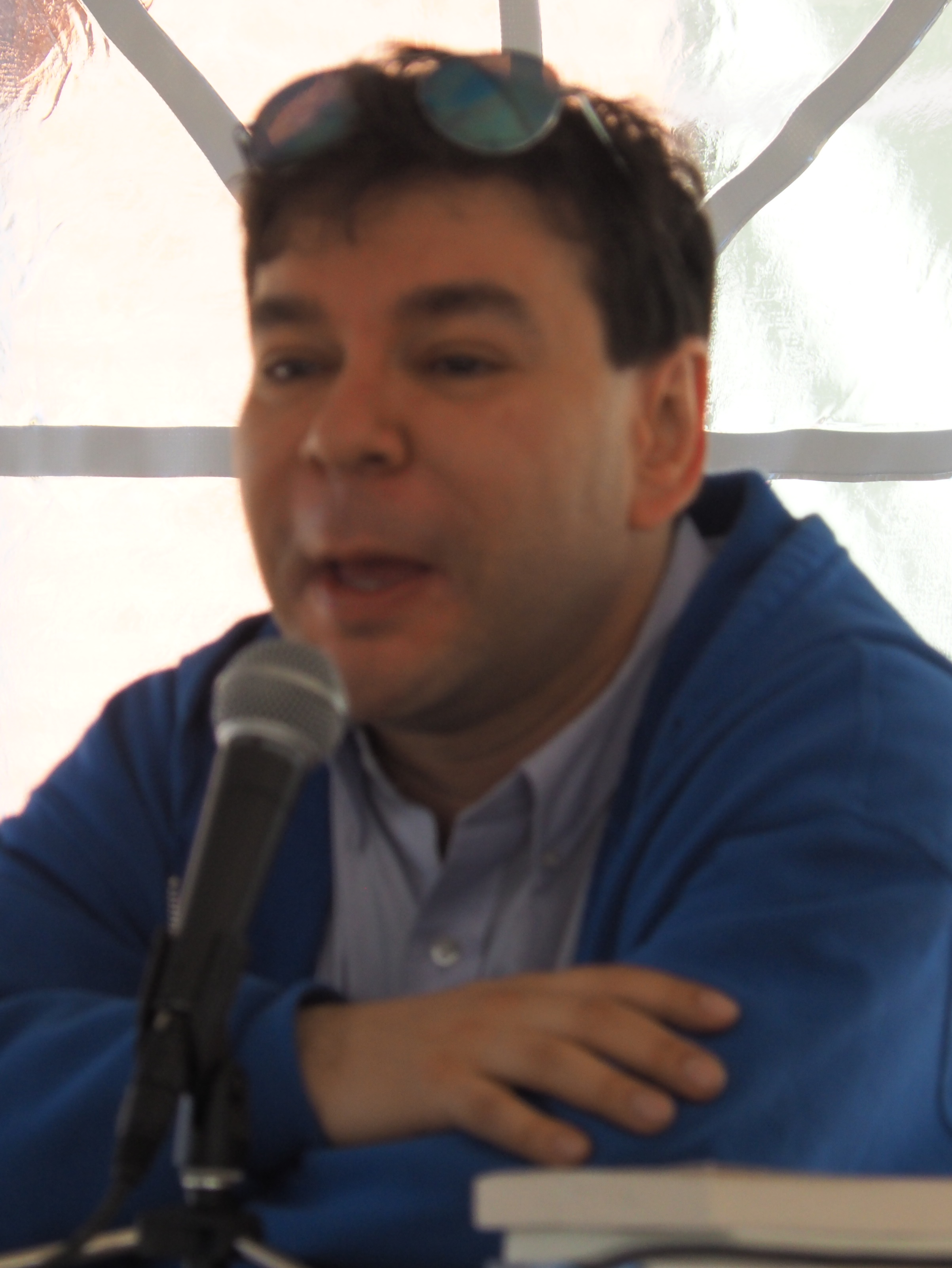
- Appel in 2019
- Born: February 21, 1973 (age 53); New York City, U.S.
- Education: Brown University (BA, MA); Columbia University (MA, MPhil, MD); New York University (MFA); Harvard University (JD); Albany Medical College (MS); City University of New York, Queens (MFA); Mount Sinai Medical Center (MPH)
- Occupations: Author; psychiatrist; bioethicist
- Writing career
- Period: 1997–present
- Genres: short story, essay, drama, novel, poem
- Website: jacobmappel.com

Jacob M. Appel (born February 21, 1973) is an American polymath, author, bioethicist, medical doctor, lawyer, and social critic. He is best known for his short stories, his work as a playwright, and his writing in the fields of reproductive ethics, organ donation, neuroethics, and euthanasia. He is also an authority on the health of United States Presidents.

Appel's novel The Man Who Wouldn't Stand Up won the Dundee International Book Prize in 2012. He is the director of Ethics Education in Psychiatry and a professor of psychiatry and medical education at the Mount Sinai School of Medicine, and he practices emergency psychiatry at the adjoining Mount Sinai Health System. Appel is the subject of the 2019 documentary film Jacob by director Jon Stahl.

== Education ==
- 1996 – Brown University, Bachelor of Arts with majors in English and American literature and in history
- 1996 – Brown University, Master of Arts
- 1998 – Columbia University, Master of Arts and Master of Philosophy
- 2000 – New York University, Master of Fine Arts, fiction writing
- 2003 – Harvard Law School, Juris Doctor
- 2009 – Columbia University College of Physicians and Surgeons, Doctor of Medicine
- 2012 – Albany Medical College, Master of Science in Bioethics
- 2013 – Queens College, City University of New York, Master of Fine Arts, playwriting
- 2013 – Icahn School of Medicine at Mount Sinai, Master of Public Health

=== Medical training ===
- 2009–2013 – Mount Sinai Hospital, medical residency in clinical psychiatry
- 2013–2014 – Mount Sinai Hospital, medical fellowship in psychosomatic medicine

== Academic bioethics ==
Appel began his career in academic bioethics at Brown University, where he taught until 2005. He now serves on the faculty of the Icahn School of Medicine at Mount Sinai in New York City, where he is Professor of Psychiatry and Medicine Education. He is also the Director of Ethics Education in Psychiatry and Medical Director of the East Harlem Health Outreach Project's mental health clinic. He has also taught medical ethics at New York University, Columbia University, and Albany Medical College. He is the author of a "Bioethics in Action" curriculum for The New York Times. Appel was also previously a columnist for The Huffington Post and Opposing Views.

Appel has published on a range of topics in academic bioethics including advocating for the decriminalization of assisted suicide, raising the possibility that this might be made available to both the terminally ill and those with intractable, long-term mental illness, and the Groningen Protocol. He has written in favor of abortion rights and fertility treatment for same-sex couples, as well as against electronic medical records, which he sees as poorly secured against hacking. He has also argued in favor of the legalization of prostitution and polygamy between consenting adults. He has raised concerns regarding the possibility that employers will require their employees to use pharmaceuticals for cognitive enhancement and has urged that death row inmates be eligible to receive kidney transplants. Appel has opposed the forcible feeding of hunger strikers, both in domestic prisons and at Guantanamo Bay.

== Writing ==
Appel has taught creative writing at the Gotham Writers' Workshop and New York University. He served as writer-in-residence at Yeshiva College in 2013. As of 2023, he is Vice President and Treasurer of the National Book Critics Circle.

He has written that exposure to literature should be a medical school admissions requirement.

== Personal life ==
Appel was born in the Bronx to Gerald B. Appel and Alice Appel and raised in Scarsdale, New York and Branford, Connecticut.

== Books ==
- The Man Who Wouldn't Stand Up (Cargo, 2012)
- The Biology of Luck (Elephant Rock, 2013)
- Scouting for the Reaper (Black Lawrence, 2014)
- Phoning Home (University of South Carolina Press, 2014)
- Einstein's Beach House (Pressgang/Butler University, 2014)
- The Magic Laundry (Snake Nation, 2015)
- Miracles and Conundrums of the Secondary Planets (Black Lawrence, 2015)
- Wedding Wipeout (Cozy Cat Press, 2013)
- The Topless Widow of Herkimer Street (Howling Bird Press/Augsburg College, 2016)
- Coulrophobia & Fata Morgana (Black Lawrence, 2016)
- The Mask of Sanity (Permanent Press, 2017)
- The Liars' Asylum (Black Lawrence Press, 2017)
- Millard Salter's Last Day (Gallery Books, 2017)
- The Amazing Mr. Morality (Vandalia Press/West Virginia University, 2018)
- The Cynic in Extremis: Poems (Able Muse, 2018)
- Amazing Things Are Happening Here (Black Lawrence, 2019)
- Surrendering Appomattox (C&R, 2019)
- Who Says You're Dead? (Algonquin, 2019)
- Winter Honeymoon (Black Lawrence, 2020)
- Shaving with Occam (Press Americana, 2022)

== Plays ==
- The Resurrection of Dismas and Gestas (2005)
- In the Floodplain (2005)
- Arborophilia (2006)
- The Three Belles of Eden (2006)
- Thirds (2007)
- The Mistress of Wholesome (2007)
- The Replacement (2008)
- Woodpecker (2008)
- Causa Mortis (2009)
- Helen of Sparta (2009)
