= Cleopatra White =

Belizean nurse, social worker and community leader (1898–1987)

Cleopatra White

Cleopatra White (28 June 1898 – 1987) was a Belizean nurse, social worker and community leader. She was the second matron of the Black Cross Nurses Association. She was one of the first formally trained nurses in Belize and was the first rural health practitioner in Gales Point and the Manatee River area of Belize. She also organized the first village council in the country, in Gales Point, recognizing the need for managing village affairs, especially in the case of hurricanes. Her model was replicated throughout Belize, and she is credited with the idea for the present village council system. She served in the relief efforts of the 1931 hurricane, Hurricane Janet (1955) and Hurricane Hattie (1961). She received a Victoria Medal in 1953 for her services from the British crown and, in 1958 went to England to accept the British Empire Medal.

== Biography ==
Cleopatra Eugenie White was born on 28 June 1898 in British Honduras, now Belize, to Joseph and Maria White. Her mother died when she was a child and she was raised by her father with one sister. White attended Miss Braddick's School for Girls and Ebenezer Primary School before pursuing nursing. In 1919, when she was 21, White followed her mentor, Vivian Seay, a fellow nurse, into organizing and promoting the Black Cross Nurses Association as a home health-care organization. Officially founded in 1920, with untrained personnel, the organization began in its second year to offer general nursing and maternity classes under Dr. K. M. B. Simon, the government medical officer, and Amy Clare Woods George, a certified British Honduran midwife who had studied in Britain.

In 1931, after the hurricane, White helped set up the nursing facilities and supply stations for the relief effort. The barracks were located at what is now the Philip S. W. Goldson International Airport. In the 1940s, White and others began training for public health services. In 1943, she attended four-hour lectures each morning and completed rounds at the hospital for four hours each afternoon to obtain practical training. She graduated a year later and qualified as a rural health nurse. Initially she was appointed to serve in Double Head Cabbage village, but then moved on to Gales Point and the Manatee River area of Belize, where she spent most of the next 16 years. She was the first rural health nurse in the area and her duties soon expanded into areas of social work. She became a mentor to many of the village children and taught hygiene practices to many young women.

Recognizing the need for managing village affairs, especially when hurricane season or boating emergencies arose, White set up the first village councils in the country at Gales Point. At the time, most travel was via boat, either on the sea or by river and boating accidents were not uncommon. She has been credited with the idea for the present village council system, which soon spread throughout the country. She was awarded a Victoria Medal in 1953 from Britain for her role in helping develop community life. After Hurricane Janet (1955) the quasi-government of elected Belizeans, formalized the village council system setting up seven-member councils in each rural area to facilitate government dialogue. She moved back to Belize City and provided health care to the citizens there. In 1958, White's work was again recognized by the British crown and she travelled to England to receive the medal of Member of the Order of the British Empire. After Hurricane Hattie hit in 1961, White drove daily to care for those who had been gathered at what would become the village at Hattieville. She was the first nurse of the Hattieville Clinic.

She was awarded the British Empire Medal (BEM) in the 1958 Birthday Honours.

When she retired from the Hattieville Clinic in the mid-1960s, White returned to Belize City and attempted to revive the Black Cross Nurses training courses, which had begun to decline. She also organized the Women's League and spearheaded fundraising and entertainments for National Festival of the Arts. White wrote scripts and songs and was a gifted storyteller often earning prizes for her work. St. John's College professor E. Beck recorded a number of her songs to preserve them as evidence of White's efforts to create pride in Creole heritage through song.

In 1986, the Women's Bureau of Belize established a prize in her honour, named the Cleopatra White Shield, for the winner of the National High School Quiz Contest. White made her last public appearance as the guest of honour at the inaugural ceremony. She died in 1987, as a pauper and resident of the Belize City Old Folks Home. After her death, the Cleopatra White Outpatient Clinic of Belize City, was established in her honour and in 1993, a postage stamp was issued picturing White and her clinic.

== Additional sources ==
- Macpherson, Anne (November 2003). "Colonial Matriarchs: Garveyism, Maternalism, and Belize's Black Cross Nurses, 1920–1952". Gender & History. 15 (3). Wiley Online Library: 507–527.
