= Henrietta Vinton Davis =

African-American actor and activist (1860-1941)

Henrietta Davis
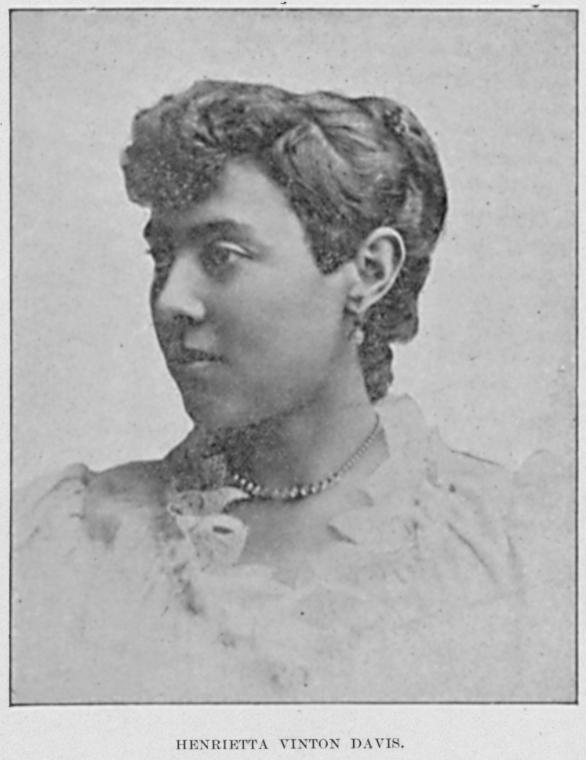
- Born: Henrietta Vinton Davis; August 25, 1860; Baltimore, Maryland, United States
- Died: November 23, 1941 (aged 81); Washington, D.C., United States
- Occupations: Actress, elocutionist, dramatic reader, playwright, International Organizer of the UNIA, Vice President Black Star Line
- Spouse: Thomas T. Symmons

Henrietta Vinton Davis (August 25, 1860 – November 23, 1941) was an American elocutionist, dramatist, and impersonator. In addition to being "the premier actress of all nineteenth-century black performers on the dramatic stage", Davis was proclaimed by Marcus Garvey to be the "greatest woman of the Negro race today".

Davis worked with Garvey, who was the founder of the Universal Negro Improvement Association (UNIA), in several capacities. From its founding in 1919 until its dissolution in the mid-1930s, she held major leadership roles in the UNIA. At the first international UNIA convention in 1920, she was elected as International Organizer. In 1927, after Garvey was deported to Jamaica, Davis was elected and served as President-General of the UNIA, Inc. from 1934–1940.

== Biography ==
Henrietta Vinton Davis was born in Baltimore to Mary Ann Johnson and her husband, musician Mansfield Vinton Davis.

Shortly after her birth, her father died. Within six months her mother had remarried to an influential Baltimorean, George A. Hackett, a member of Bethel African Methodist Episcopal Church. He worked to defeat the 1859 Jacobs bill that was crafted to enslave the children of free African Americans and deport their parents from the state of Maryland. Hackett died in April 1870 after a short illness. Upon his death Mary Ann Hackett moved with her daughter Henrietta to Washington, D.C.

Henrietta was educated in the public schools.

== Career ==
=== Early work ===
At the early age of fifteen, she passed the necessary examination and was awarded the position of a teacher in the public schools of Maryland. After a period of time teaching in Maryland, Davis moved to Louisiana to teach. She later returned to Maryland to care for her ailing mother. She had the certificate of the Board of Education.

In 1878, while still in her late teens, she became the first African-American woman to be employed by the Office of the Recorder of Deeds in Washington, D.C.; she worked as a copyist under George A. Sheridan. In 1881, noted abolitionist, civil rights activist, and Davis' family friend Frederick Douglass was appointed Recorder of Deeds.

=== Acting ===
In the early 1880s, Davis began elocution and dramatic art lessons under the tutelage of Marguerite Saxton of Washington. On April 25, 1883, she was introduced by Frederick Douglass before a distinguished integrated audience. She appeared in performances in New London, Connecticut; New York state, Boston, Massachusetts; and "more than a dozen of the larger cities of the Eastern and Middle States".

During the summer of 1883, Davis (under the management of James Monroe Trotter and William H. Dupree) made a tour of Boston, Worcester, and New Bedford, Massachusetts; Providence and Newport, Rhode Island; Hartford and New Haven, Connecticut; and New York City and Albany.

During this time she continued perfecting her craft under Professor Edwin Lawrence of New York and Rachael Noah of Boston. She also attended the Boston School of Oratory.

Her performances consisted of performing a diverse spectrum of works: from Paul Laurence Dunbar's Negro dialects to such plays as Romeo and Juliet, As You Like It; "Mary Queen of Scots"; "Cleopatra's Dying Speech"; "The Battle" by Friedrich Schiller; and "How Tom Sawyer Got His Fence Whitewashed" by Mark Twain. She is considered the first African American after Ira Aldridge to have successfully performed Shakespeare. On January 17, 1884, she appeared before a crowded house in Melodeon Hall, Cincinnati, Ohio. From 1884 to 1886, she appeared in various Shakespearean and classical tragedy roles with John A. Arneaux's troupe in New York City.

In 1893 Davis started her own company in Chicago, traveled to the Caribbean, and collaborated on writing Our Old Kentucky Home with distinguished journalist and future Garveyite John Edward Bruce.

Throughout her entire career, Davis only performed in four full-length productions: Damon and Pythias (1884), Dessalines (1893), Our Old Kentucky Home (1898), and Henri Christophe (1912).

== Political activism ==
Davis was a supporter of the Populist Party. Later she backed the Socialist Party.

=== UNIA-ACL leadership ===
==== 1919-1920: Founding of the organization ====
While traveling in the Caribbean, Davis learned of the work of Marcus Garvey, a Jamaican immigrant to the United States who founded a Pan-African movement. On June 15, 1919, she was among the guests who spoke at a meeting of the UNIA held at the Palace Casino in Harlem, New York City.

She performed a rendition of "Little Brown Baby With Sparkling Eyes" by Paul Laurence Dunbar. As part of her presentation, she held an African-American doll, one of the earliest manufactured. Her prop had been loaned for the occasion by the Berry & Ross company. She decided to give up her career to work with Garvey and the UNIA-ACL, elected in 1920 as the UNIA's first International Organizer. She also served as the second Vice-President of the Black Star Line.

At the UNIA-ACL convention in August 1920, she was one of the signatories of The Declaration of the Rights of the Negro Peoples of the World. Among the 54 declarations made in this document are resolutions that the colors red, black, and green are to be the symbolic colors of the African race and the term "nigger" cease being used. It demanded that the word "Negro" be written with a capital "N". During the same convention, the High Potentate of the UNIA conferred upon her the title "Lady Commander of the Sublime Order of the Nile".

==== 1921–1934: Expansion of executive leadership ====
In 1921, Davis rose in rank to become the fourth assistant President-General of the UNIA-ACL. She established UNIA-ACL divisions in Cuba, Guadeloupe, St. Thomas, Virgin Islands; Port-au-Prince, Haiti; Trinidad and Tobago, and Jamaica. Unseated by Garvey in June 1923 in an effort to quell dissent in the UNIA's New York headquarters, she was reelected during the August 1924 convention. On August 25, 1924, Davis chaired the annual convention as the Fourth-Assistant President General of the UNIA. In December, she traveled to Liberia, West Africa, as the only woman in the UNIA delegation, which was seeking consent to establish a UNIA-ACL colony in Liberia. In that same year she was a member of a committee that delivered petitions to U.S. President Calvin Coolidge seeking Garvey's exoneration on mail fraud charges. In 1925, she organized a trip through the Caribbean, taking with her Maymie de Mena as translator.

At the 1929 International Convention of the UNIA, after Garvey had been deported to Jamaica, Davis was elected UNIA Secretary General. By 1932 she broke with Garvey and became first Assistant President General of the rival UNIA, Inc. In the 1934 convention she was elected as President of the rival organization. She served in this role until 1940.

== Death ==
On November 23, 1941, Davis died in Saint Elizabeth's Hospital, Washington, D.C., at the age of 81. She was originally buried in Columbian Harmony Cemetery in Washington, D.C. Her remains were transferred to National Harmony Memorial Park in Landover, Maryland, in 1959, after Columbian Harmony closed that year.

== Legacy ==
In 2014, American feminist playwright Carolyn Gage paid tribute to Henrietta Vinton Davis, along with actresses and directors Eva Le Gallienne and Minnie Maddern Fiske, when she was awarded the first Lifetime Achievement Award given by Venus Theatre, founded by Deborah Randall in Laurel, Maryland. In her acceptance speech, Gage said about Davis:

She was well aware that the classical canon was by and about white people and she embraced the work of contemporary Black playwrights attempting to write new epic plays. She produced and performed in plays about the successful slave rebellion in Haiti, and she co-wrote a musical called My Old Kentucky Home. Unlike other plantation shows, Henrietta’s play included the war, and the entire second act portrayed formerly enslaved people taking over the plantation of their former captors. Not surprisingly, her theatre company ended up broke and stranded in Denver. An opinion by some people is that, since Henrietta was so far ahead of her time, she has largely been written out of the history of Black theatre.

== See also ==
- List of orators
- American dramatists
- American Impressionists
- American literature
- Theater of the United States
- Universal Negro Improvement Association
- Black Cross Nurses
