= Gales Point =

Gales Point Manatee
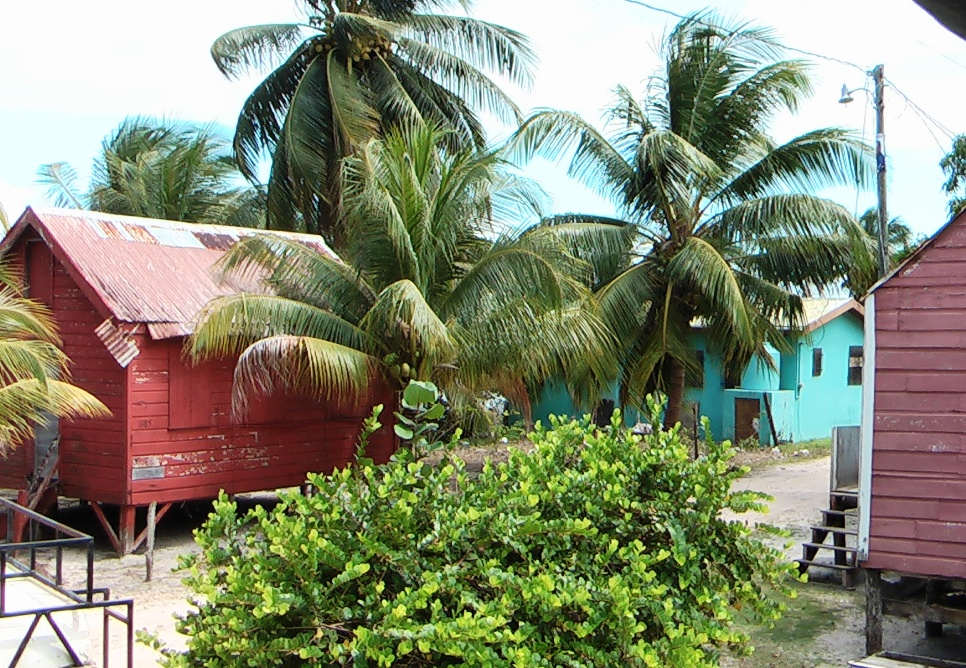
- Gales Point center

- Location within Belize
- Coordinates: 17°11′N 88°20′W
- Country: Belize
- District: Belize District
- Constituency: Belize Rural Central

Population (2010)
  - Total: 296(est.)
- Time zone: UTC-6 (Central)
- Climate: Af

Gales Point Manatee is a village in Belize District in the nation of Belize, Central America. The village is bordered by five other communities, namely Mullins River, St. Margaret, La Democracia, Gracie Rock, and Freetown Sibun. The village is bordered east by the Caribbean Sea. In 2000, Gales Point had a population of about 500 people, most of whom subsist on fishing and farming.

Most recently, in 2010, the population was placed at 296.

Gales Point Manatee or Malanti is the local name for the village. The majority of the village’s population lives on a peninsula located in the Southern Lagoon, which is a manatee reserve. The Southern Lagoon's water is brackish. This lagoon connects directly to the Caribbean Sea through the Manatee Bar River. It also has 14 square miles (36 km^{2}) of wildlife reserve known as the Gales Point Wild Life Sanctuary.

== Demographics ==
At the time of the 2010 census, Gales Point had a population of 297. Of these, 89.2% were Creole, 6.1% Mixed, 2.4% East Indian, 0.7% Caucasian, 0.7% Garifuna and 0.3% Mestizo.

== History ==
Ritamae Hyde (2009) recently established that, based on (textual and oral) evidence, Gales Point Manatee was an early maroon community, a settlement made by persons who resisted enslavement by fleeing the control of the colonial authorities and "slave masters" to live in self-sufficient communities in the hinterlands.

It is believed that Gale's Point became one of such communities where "ex-enslaved" persons from "nearby areas such as Sibun River, Runaway Creek, Mullins River and Main River" established around the late 1700s and early 1800s (Hyde: 2009, p. 13, 16).

Colonial knowledge of maroonage in British Honduras dates to 1816 when Superintendent Col. George Arthur recorded that there was "a community 'near Shiboon River, very difficult to discover'" outside the influence of the colonial authorities (quoted in Shoman: 2000, 51).

In 1820, Arthur again made reference to "two Slave Towns, which it appears have been long formed in the Blue Mountains to the Northward of Sibun" (ibid).

In around 1944, Gales Point became the first village in Belize to have a village council. Nurse Cleopatra White, first nurse in the village, recognized the need for managing village affairs and organized a council. Her idea later became the model for the current village council system which has been implemented throughout the country.

== Culture ==
Due to the geographic isolation of Gales Point Manatee from the rest of the country, some traditional African practices continue to be observable (see Iyo, et al. 2007; Hyde: 2009).

=== Food and drinks ===
Like many West African cultures, the people of Manatee were traditionally reliant on ground food and other locally planted crops for subsistence.

Fishing and hunting were also a much greater source of food for the community. For example, fish seré is a dish which is essentially a coconut-milk soup of fish and ground foods (yam, coco, potato, etc.). It may also be served along with white rice.

The people at Manatee are also well known for their homemade wines from local berries and cashews, amongst others fruits.

=== Sambai ===
The origin of the word Sambai is not fully known, but Sambai refers to the rhythm style, drum style and event from the village of Gales Point Manatee. The Sambai rhythm is the most unusual aspect of Kriol culture from Manatee (taken from National Kriol Council).

It is theorized that since the escaped slaves, or maroons, were likely first generation slaves, they probably remembered rituals and rhythms from their home in Africa. Since the Goombay (gumbeh) drum was not outlawed until 1790, it's easy to say that these rhythms were brought with these escaped slaves to the area near Runaway Creek. It is likely that the rhythms migrated from their origins as the people themselves did carrying with them the flowing and mutating rhythmic dialects of their own style, still strongly rooted in Africa.

The Sambai is by tradition considered a fertility dance and occurs during the full moon cycle. Farmers plant and harvest crops directly related to lunar cycles as well and this may contribute to the reason that the Sambai is considered a fertility ritual. Also, many lyrics are sexual in nature such as:

"Hok-i-nani-beh…here here ….hok-i-nani-beh…koko faiya."

In recent times the Sambai has developed into simply a social event and is no more a fertility ritual. It is done along with most other nighttime activities involving other dances.

Elders remember the days when children were not allowed to participate in the Sambai. Although children are allowed to be at a Sambai now the event has not changed much since the old days. A circle of dancers and drummers gather around a pine wood fire. Drummers begin playing and "call" the song then the crowd answers. This "call and response" style is typical of the African tradition. For example: Call: "Aanti Kala Kala Kalala sohnting so" Response: "Aanti noh badi mi".

The dancers enter one at a time and "Jump Sambai" as it is referred to. When the individual exits the ring he or she chooses the next dancer by pointing to or "reeling in" with a gesture or simply exits next to the person they are calling in.

Often subtle courtships were explored as individuals frequently choose the candidate of their pursuit for the evening. If the person was interested they would return the gesture by choosing back the potential partner. If the person was not interested in the courtship then the discrete lack of reciprocation would be noticed only by the pursuer of the courtship.

=== Story telling ===
Storytelling has always been an important form of entertainment in the village.

The introductions always started with a bizarre exaggeration to make the crowd laugh such as "Back in the day when monkey use to chew tobacco" and ended with the classic Creole line "if the pin neva ben, di story neva end".

Some of the stories are long and have morals that can only be captured if one pays keen attention.

The story may also change according to the mood of the teller. For example, the storyteller mentioned or integrated Hurricane Richard in two of the stories, making the audience laugh at a recent disaster that affected the community.

=== Outside influences ===
It is important to recognize that culture is always in a process of change due to both internal and external occurrences and influences. Gales Point is not in total isolation or unaffected by the broader Belizean cultural lifestyles and 'Western culture'. Many things have changed in the community.

For example, the Sambai is no longer the same. There are more children participating in the dance than actual adults. In the past, no children were allowed to do the Sambai.

People now live in concrete houses as opposed to thatched houses in the past. Processed and canned foods are available in the village. There is a local Christian church. Rastafari, or at least the growing of 'locks', is now quite common among the youth (for discussion on Rastafari in Belize, see Lawrence: 2012).

These modern influences at the same time have benefited the community. For example, they now have access to electricity and water. There is little economic activity occurring in the village which leads people to migrate out of the community. Many persons hope that increase tourist arrivals will increase the economic activities of the community and decrease outward migration.

== Tourism ==
The village of Gales Point has some tourism, mostly for those interested in seeing the rich ecosystem of the area, including a large West Indian manatee population. It is also possible to camp at Methos Campsite near the end of the point.

At the end of the point is a lodge called Manatee Lodge, which offers hikes, manatee spotting trips, and snorkelling in the Caribbean Sea at nearby islands and cayes.

== Bibliography ==
- Bolland, Nigel. Colonialism and Resistance in Belize: Essays in Historical Sociology. 1988. Mexico: Cubola, 2003. Print.
- Cocom, Rolando. (2014). I mi gawn da malanti: Reflections from a field-trip at Gales Point Manatee. Belizean Minds Blogspot. Web Article.
- Hyde, Ritamae. "Stoan Baas" people: An Ethnohistorical study of the Gales Point Manatee community of Belize. The University of the West Indies, 2009.
- "Stoan Baas" people: An Ethnohistorical study of the Gales Point Manatee community of Belize. Journal of Belizean Studies 31.2 (2012).
- Iyo, Aondofe. "Flight from enslavement in the Bay of Honduras to Freedom in Petén, Guatemala: Preliminary Findings." Belize Archeology and Anthropology Conference. 2012.
- Iyo, Aondofe, Tzalam Froyla, and Francis Humphreys. Belize New Vision: African and Maya Civilizations, Heritage of a New Nation. Belize: Factory Books, 2007. Print.
- Iyo, Joseph. Towards Understanding Belize's Multi-Cultural History and Identity. Belize: University of Belize, 2000. Print.
- Lawrence, V. (2012). Dreadlock displaced: Stereotyping Rastafarians in Belize Journal of Belizean Studies, 31(2).
