= Heijnen =

Heijnen is a Dutch patronymic surname. Heijn is a regional short form of the given name Hendrik. In Belgium the name is more often spelled Heynen. People with this surname include:

- Eugène Heijnen (born 1964), Dutch politician and tax consultant
- Harry Heijnen (1940–2015), Dutch football player
- Hilde Heijnen (born 1965), Belgian actress
- Pierre Heijnen (born 1953), Dutch politician
- Pieter Heijnen (born 1979), Dutch DJ
- Sibyl Heijnen (born 1961), Dutch visual artist
- Tonnie Heijnen (born 1967), Dutch table tennis player

Heijne

- Bas Heijne (born 1960), Dutch writer and translator

Heynen

- Bryan Heynen (born 1997), Belgian football player
- Hilde Heynen (born 1959), Belgian architectural theoretician
- Julia Heynen, American actress
- Louise Heynen (1862–1932), German actress and theater director known as Louise Dumont
- Vital Heynen (born 1969), Belgian volleyball player and coach

== See also ==
- Heinen
- Mathilde ter Heijne (born 1969), Dutch artist in Berlin
- Gunnar von Heijne (born 1951), Swedish chemist, physicist and bioinformatician
