= Gales Point Wildlife Sanctuary =

The Gales Point Wildlife Sanctuary is in the Belize District approximately 23.7 southwest of Belize City and 34 km north of Dangriga. The Sanctuary includes Southern Lagoon, Sapodilla Lagoon, Western Lagoon, Quashie Trap Lagoon and a portion of the Manatee river. It has a shoreline of 66-foot that is along all the lagoons and waterways except for the peninsula. The Wildlife Sanctuary covers a complex matrix of creeks, mangroves, mudflats and brackish lagoons. Both the rivers and creeks drains into the lagoon from the west. The lagoon is also connected to the Caribbean Sea via the Bar River.

== Protection of Endangered Species ==
The primary purpose of the Sanctuary is for the protection of the Endangered Antillean manatees. The regionally endemic Central American river turtle and the Goliath grouper are two other species of conservation interest within the Sanctuary as they are both critically endangered. Just outside the sanctuary is another focal point of conservation interest on the sand bar facing the Caribbean Sea for the critically endangered Sea turtle Hawksbill turtle, Green turtle and Loggerhead turtle nest here each year. This area has been recognized as one of the most important nesting beaches within the wider Caribbean.

== Species in the Sanctuary ==
The Sanctuary has a diverse array of species including fish, mammal, reptile and bird population. There are 26 species of international concern within the Sanctuary and the 66-foot buffer vegetation on the edge of the lagoon. The water opossum, Yucatán howler monkey, Morlet's crocodile, American salt water crocodile, Baird's tapir, Neotropical river otter, cownose ray and the Cubera snapper can be found within or around the sanctuary. They are also 330 species of birds, including the yellow-headed parrot, the great curassow, and the jabiru stork can be seen. Several other species can be found just outside the protected are such as the jaguar, puma, margay, ocelot, jaguarundi and the Central American spider monkey.
