= Helen of Sparta (play) =

2009 play by Jacob M. Appel

Helen of Sparta is a tragicomic play by Jacob M. Appel. It premiered at the Venus Theatre in Laurel, Maryland on January 23, 2009. The play starred Julia Heynen as Helen, D. Grant Cloyd as Paris, Phil Amico as Protesilaus, Mary Burke-Hueffmeier as Laodamia and Ellie Nicoll as Oenone. Critic Ted Ying singled out Heynen's performance as a "forceful personification of the face that launched a thousand ships" and praised her as "beautiful, confident, [and] charismatic."

The play retells the story of the Trojan War from Helen's point of view. Paris kidnaps Helen from Sparta and carries her off to Troy for a casual affair, only to discover that she is an extremely fastidious and demanding captive. At the same time, Helen’s husband, King Menelaus, played by Christian Sullivan; finds his efforts to rescue his wife impeded when he is placed on the Pan-Hellenic “Do Not Sail” list. T. Smith in the Baltimore Sun described the play as "original but problematic."

The play was shortlisted for the Best American Plays 2010. It was named one of the ten best regional plays of 2009 by the American Theatre Association.
