= Julia Heynen =

American stage actress

Julia Heynen is an American stage actress. She defined the role of Helen in Jacob Appel's Helen of Sparta at the Venus Theatre, a role in which critic Ted Ying singled out her performance as a "forceful personification of the face that launched a thousand ships" and praised her as "beautiful, confident, [and] charismatic." She also originated the part of Ophelia in Chris Wind's Not Such Stuff.

Critic Sophia Carteret wrote of Heynen that she "lets Ophelia's voice speak out as Shakespeare should have done. She lets us see the conflicting emotions of a girl learning to see the world with a woman's eyes; one who, in aiming to do right, comes to see that the duty of listening, reflecting, and obeying can be less important than the acts of observing, questioning, and seeking to correct the errors committed by oneself and others. Given the longest segment in the play, this character shows the most complexity and personal development on stage and the actor gives the role all that it needs to succeed both dramatically and intellectually."

Heynen earlier starred in regional productions of Private Eyes, Hedda Gabler, Pirandello's Six Characters in Search of an Author and nearly three dozen other productions in the Washington and Baltimore areas.

As of the summer of 2010, she is starring in the Red Branch Theatre's production of David Auburn's Proof. The New Dramatist named her a "local legend" in 2009, the first from the Baltimore-Washington region in eight years.

In 2011 Heynen moved to Chicago, where she currently resides as of spring 2014. She is currently a part of the Denver Team at iO Chicago.

Heynen is a graduate of Goucher College.
