= Alice S. Presto =

American Black suffragist, politician

Alice Sampson Presto
- Born: Alice Sampson; 1879; Cambridge, Massachusetts, U.S.
- Died: unknown, after 1936
- Other names: Alice Monroe Presto, Alice Moore Presto
- Organization(s): Woman's Political and Civic Alliance (WPCA)
- Spouse: Walter Leo Presto

Alice Sampson Presto (1879–?) was a suffragist and the first African-American woman to run for office in the state of Washington.

== Early life ==
Martha Murphy and Franklin Sampson were the parents of Alice S. Presto, who was born in Cambridge, Massachusetts around 1879. Presto had three brothers, and two sisters. Presto moved to Seattle, Washington, in the 1890s, where she met her husband, Walter Leo Presto. He was an Afro-Cuban immigrant whose career included being a porter and a minister. Together they had three children, after losing two to childbirth. First Gladys Presto was born in 1898, then Dorothy Presto in 1902, and Martha Presto in 1904.

Presto is identified in some sources as Alice Monroe Presto and as Alice Moore Presto.

== Career ==
Presto spent many years as a stay-at-home mom, tending to her three children. During this time, Washington became the first state to grant Women's suffrage in 1910, before the Nineteenth Amendment had been ratified. Through this historical event, Presto became a prominent figure in the fight for civil and political rights. Presto was one of the founding members of the NAACP branch in Seattle. For six years she served as a secretary on this branch. Presto was also responsible for founding the Woman's Political and Civic Alliance (WPCA) in 1916, and was the president of this organization. Presto was also responsible for founding the Washington State Federation of Colored Women's Club, where she served as the second vice president.

In 1918, Presto ran for state senate on the Republican ticket from the 37th legislative district. She was the first Black Woman to run for legislative office in the state of Washington. Her platform "supported equal pay for women, an increase in widow’s pension, an Industrial Insurance Act for workers, reforms to child labor laws, and free tuition for children of taxpayers attending state public institutions." She also advocated for the cost of living for widows, and that a tax payer's children should not have to pay for tuition in educational institutions. Presto's advocacy heavily influenced the Black women of the community. Unfortunately, Presto only received 460 votes compared to the winning candidate's 1205 votes and ultimately lost the election.

For the rest of her career, Presto stayed involved with the WPCA where she was a treasurer. She was also a treasurer in the King Country Republican League. She was also a member of the Seattle chapter of the Universal Negro Improvement Association.
