= Heinen =

Heinen is a Dutch and Low German patronymic surname meaning "son of Hein". Notable people with the surname include:

- Bregje Heinen (born 1993), Dutch model
- Danton Heinen (born 1995), Canadian ice hockey player
- Dirk Heinen (born 1970), German football player
- Gabriele Heinen-Kljajic (born 1962), German politician
- Heinz Heinen (1941–2013), Belgian-German historian
- João Pedro Heinen (born 1997), Brazilian football player
- Josef Heinen (1929–1988), German sprinter
- Mike Heinen (born 1967), American golfer
- Nancy R. Heinen (born 1956), American lawyer and business executive

== See also ==
- Heinen's Fine Foods
- Heijnen, Dutch variant spelling of the surname
- Heine, German variant spelling of the surname
