= Isaiah Emmanuel Morter =

Belizean planter (1860–1924)

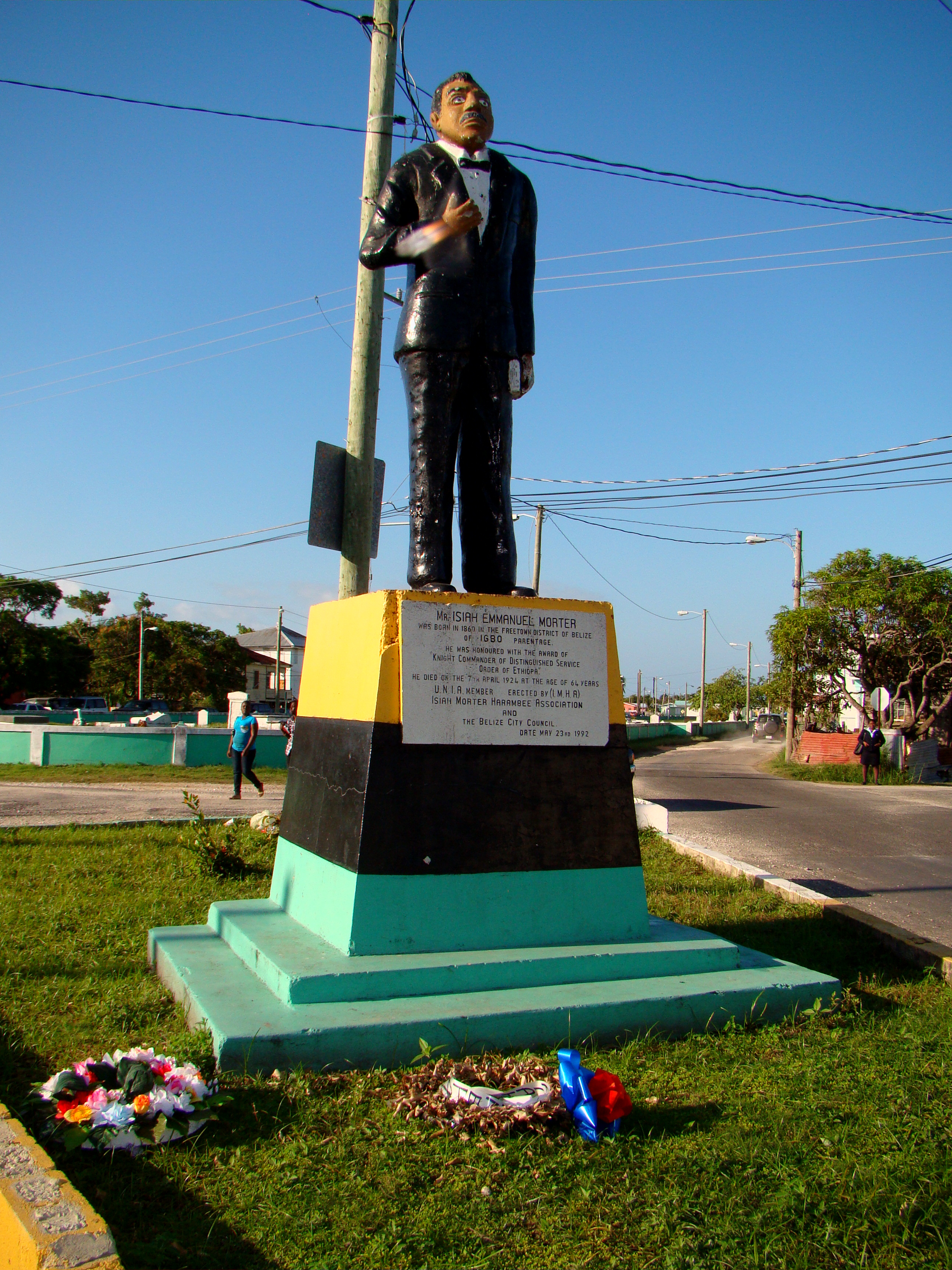
Morter's statue near the St John's Cathedral in Belize City, Belize

Isaiah Emmanuel Morter (sometimes spelled Isiah) (1860 – 7 April 1924) was born in 1860 in the Freetown district of Belize. He was of Igbo descent coming from a line of slaves brought to America from Nigeria. Marcus Garvey wrote that "Morter grew up fighting the oppositions and difficulties generally surrounding one born to his condition, until he lifted himself to the highest pinnacle of service to his race and to his country."

By planting and growing bananas and coconuts, Morter built a fortune and is widely regarded as Belize's first millionaire of color. His nicknames included "the Coconut King" and "Guinea Sigar" and he owned Caye Chapel and other plantations. For his achievements he was honoured with the award of Knight Commander of Distinguished Service Order of Ethiopia. He was also a strong supporter of Marcus Garvey's Universal Negro Improvement Association.

Morter died on 7 April 1924.

A statue of Morter can be found at the end of Albert Street, near St. John's Cathedral, in Belize City. He is not widely known today by the public in Belize.
