= James R. Stewart =

American civil right activist

James Robert Stewart G.S.A. Ph. (October 1, 1903 – April 30, 1964) was a member of the Universal Negro Improvement Association, and succeeded Marcus Garvey as President-General of the organization. He successfully relocated its headquarters to Liberia.

== Life ==
Stewart was born in Moorhead, Mississippi, the son of a wealthy plantation owner; his uncle Professor William Stewart taught in Centreville, Mississippi. He began school in Morehead and moved to Cleveland by 1915, where he studied art and commercial business. After completing school, he temporarily served as a mail clerk at the post office, became a Spanish instructor, and served as an interpreter for the Pennsylvania Railroad. He became an amateur boxing champion in Ohio, weighing in at 138 pounds.

Stewart joined the Universal Negro Improvement Association (UNIA) as a teenager in 1919. He became the President of the Cleveland Division in 1933 and State Commissioner in 1937 after taking President-General Garvey's Course of African Philosophy and graduating with high honors. After Garvey's death in June 1940, the August 1940 Emergency Conference of the UNIA Commissioners in New York City elected Stewart President-General to complete the final two years of Garvey's term.

=== President-General ===
As President-General, Stewart transferred the International Headquarters of the UNIA from New York to Cleveland and immediately launched a national speaking tour to inspire existing Divisions and create new ones. He held a series of Conferences and Conventions, launched the New Negro World Newspaper, and resumed offering the Course of African Philosophy.

By 1943, he obtained sixty five acres of farmland in Oregonia, Ohio and within 6 years transformed it into a modern community. Unhappy with this development, a rehabilitating committee held a conference in Detroit, Michigan. In 1949, President-General Stewart successfully repatriated his family and other supporters to Liberia, officially establishing the International Headquarters of the UNIA-ACL on African soil. The move led to a split in the organization; a faction of opponents led by Thomas W. Harvey was formed to denounce Stewart. Harvey was appointed as President-General of the new UNIA group, whose headquarters was established in Philadelphia in 1951.

Stewart maintained and expanded the UNIA-ACL program and estate in Liberia, establishing a productive farm, restaurant, school, and hospital. He maintained a close relationship with President William Tubman of Liberia who was serving as the UNIA-ACL Potentate and Supreme Commissioner by 1954.

President-General Stewart died in Liberia in 1964. He was survived by his wife, Goldie Stewart, two sons, Victor and James Jr, and three daughters, Anita, Donna and Roberta.
