= Universal Negro Improvement Association and African Communities League =

Black nationalist fraternal organization

- Flag of the Universal Negro Improvement Association

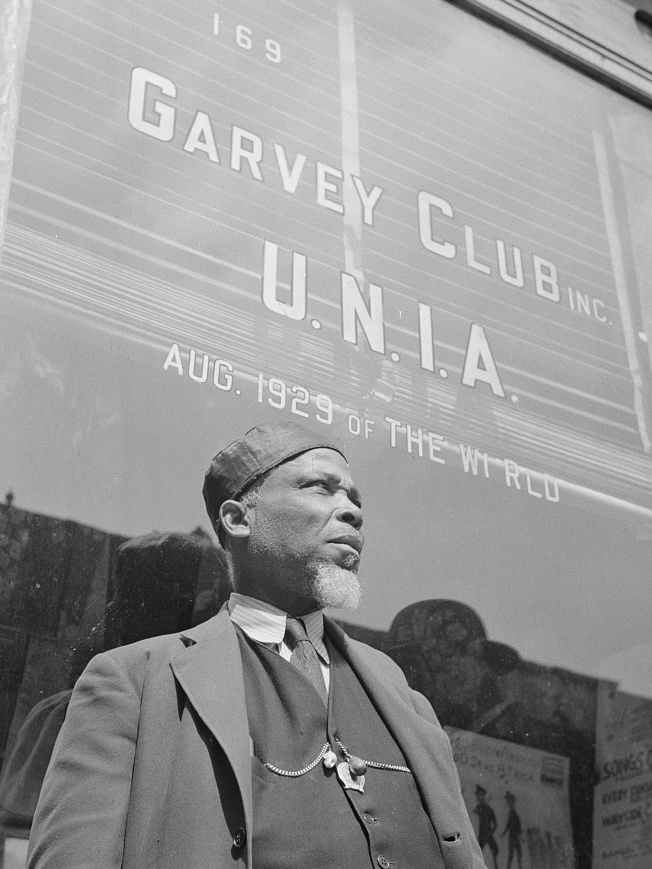
- Garvey Club Inc. U.N.I.A. New York City office in April 1943 and a member
- Abbreviation: UNIA
- Formation: July 20, 1914; 112 years ago
- Founder: Marcus Garvey, Amy Ashwood Garvey
- Founded at: Jamaica
- President: Michael R. Duncan
- Website: unia-aclgovernment.com

The Universal Negro Improvement Association and African Communities League (UNIA-ACL) is a Black nationalist fraternal organization founded by Marcus Garvey, a Jamaican immigrant to the United States, and his then-wife Amy Ashwood Garvey. The African Nationalist organization enjoyed its greatest strength in the 1920s, and was influential prior to Garvey's deportation to Jamaica in 1927. After that its prestige and influence declined, but it had a strong influence on African-American history and development. The UNIA was said to be "unquestionably, the most influential anticolonial organization in Jamaica prior to 1938," according to Honor Ford-Smith.

The organization was founded to work for the advancement of people of African ancestry around the world. Its motto is "One God! One Aim! One Destiny!" and its slogan is "Africa for the Africans, at home and abroad!" The broad mission of the UNIA-ACL led to the establishment of numerous auxiliary components, among them the African Legion (a paramilitary group), the African Black Cross Nurses, plus businesses such as the Black Star Steamship Line and the Negro Factories Corporation.

== Name ==
In an article entitled "The Negro's Greatest Enemy", published in Current History (September 1923), Garvey explained the origin of the organization's name:

Where did the name of the organization come from? It was while speaking to a West Indian Negro who was a passenger with me from Southampton, who was returning home to the West Indies from Basutoland with his Basuto wife, I further learned of the horrors of native life in Africa. He related to me in conversation such horrible and pitiable tales that my heart bled within me. Retiring from the conversation to my cabin, all day and the following night I pondered over the subject matter of that conversation, and at midnight, lying flat on my back, the vision and thought came to me that I should name the organization the Universal Negro Improvement Association and African Communities (Imperial) League. Such a name I thought would embrace the purpose of all black humanity. Thus to the world a name was born, a movement created, and a man became known.

== Early history ==
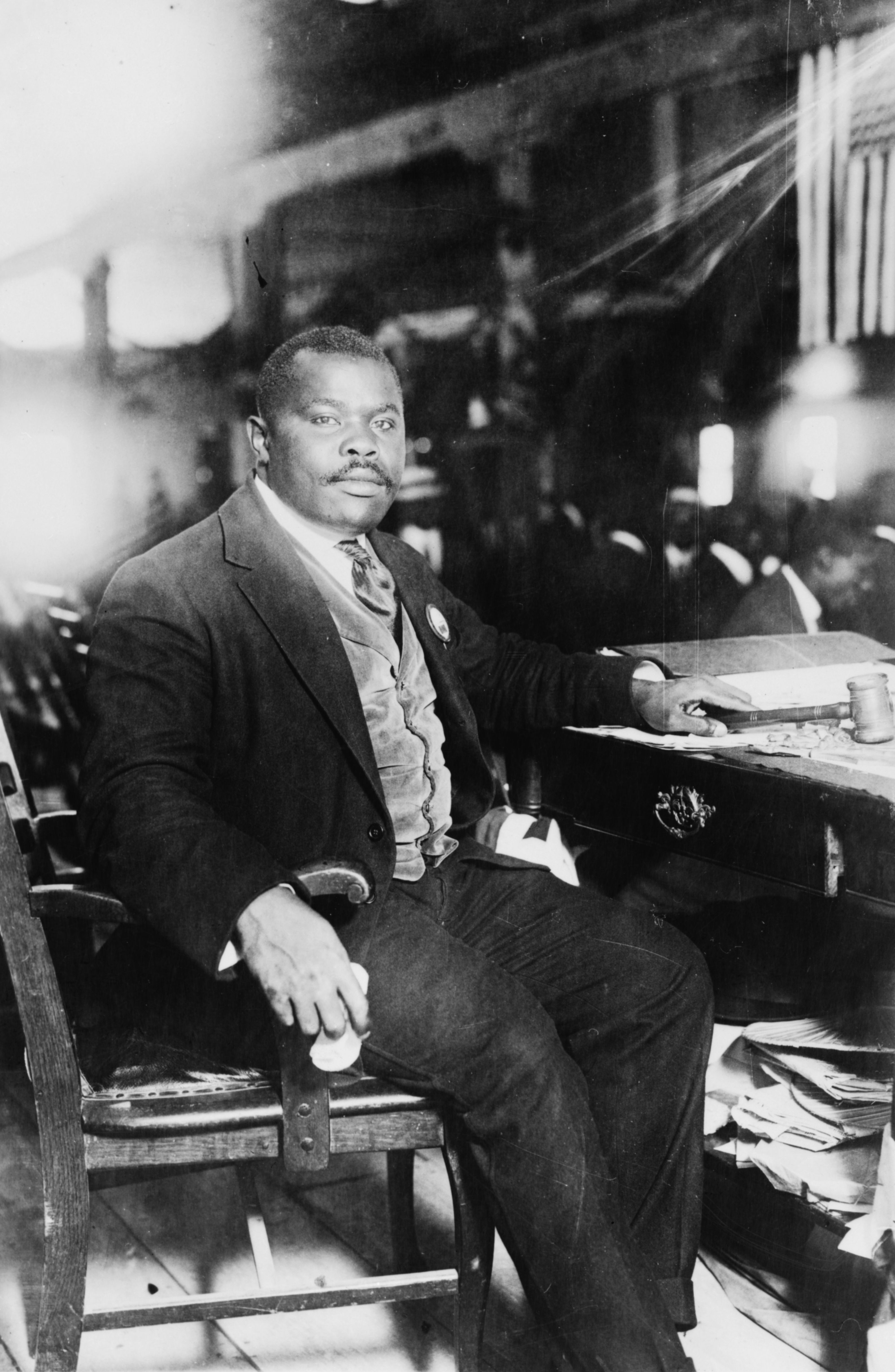
Marcus Garvey

Originally from Saint Ann's Bay, Jamaica, Marcus Garvey left at 23 and traveled throughout Central America and moved for a time to England. During his travels he became convinced that uniting Blacks was the only way to improve their condition. Towards that end, he departed England on June 17, 1914, aboard the SS Trent, returning to Jamaica on July 7, 1914. He founded the UNIA in Kingston later that month, intending to unite all of Africa and its diaspora into the organization. After traveling through the United States beginning in March 1916, Garvey inaugurated the New York Division of the UNIA in 1918 with 13 members.

The Negro World was founded on August 17, 1918, as a weekly newspaper to express the ideas of the organization. Garvey contributed a front-page editorial each week in which he developed the organization's position on different issues related to people of African ancestry around the world, in general, and the UNIA, in particular. Eventually claiming a circulation of 500,000, the newspaper was printed in several languages. It contained a page specifically for women readers, documented international events related to people of African ancestry, and was distributed throughout the African diaspora until publication ceased in 1933.

In 1919, the UNIA purchased the first of what would be numerous Liberty Halls. Located at 114 West 138th Street, in Harlem, New York City, the building had a seating capacity of 6,000. The single-level hall with low ceilings had previously been home to the Metropolitan Baptist Tabernacle. It was dedicated on July 27, 1919. On Sunday evenings, it was the site of the weekly UNIA meeting; it also housed a restaurant. Later that year the Association organized the first of its two steamship companies and a separate business corporation.

Incorporated in Delaware as a domestic corporation on June 27, 1919, the Black Star Line, Inc. (BSL) was capitalized at 10 million dollars. It sold shares individually valued at five dollars to both UNIA members and non-members alike. Proceeds from stock sales were used to purchase first the SS Yarmouth and then the SS Shady Side. The Shady Side was used by the association for summer outings and excursions, as well as rented out on charter to other organizations. The BSL later purchased the Kanawha as its third vessel. This small yacht was intended for inter-island transportation in the West Indies and was rechristened the SS Antonio Maceo.

Also established in 1919 was the Negro Factories Corporation, with a capitalization of one million dollars. It generated income and provided around 700 jobs by its numerous enterprises: three grocery stores, two restaurants, a laundry, a tailor shop, a dressmaking shop, a millinery store, a printing company, and doll factory. However, most went out of business by 1922.

With the growth of its membership from 1918 through 1924, as well as income from its various economic enterprises, UNIA purchased additional Liberty Halls in the US, Canada, Costa Rica, Belize, Panama, Java, and other countries. UNIA also purchased farms in Ohio and other states. It purchased land in Claremont, Virginia with the intention of founding Liberty University.

== Negro Factories Corporation ==
The Negro Factories Corporation of the Universal Negro Improvement Association and African Communities League, was the "finance arm", capitalized for $1 million, offering stock shares, at $5 each, for African-Americans to buy, to provide loans to establish black-owned businesses.

The Negro Factories Corporation was intended to "build and operate factories in the big industrial centers of the United States, Central America, the West Indies and Africa to manufacture every marketable commodity." It was an effort for economic development within communities of African descent. Businesses included a chain of grocery stores, a restaurant, a steam laundry, a tailor and dressmaking shop, a millinery store and a publishing house. The UNIA had difficulty keeping the businesses going, and by the mid-1920s, many had closed.

In 1921, Negro Factories Corporation became insolvent.

"Garvey appointed inexperienced people to run organizations because he valued loyalty over competence".

"Financial mismanagement of these organizations led to his indictment on mail fraud charges in 1922. He was convicted and sentenced to Atlanta's federal penitentiary in 1925."

== First international convention ==
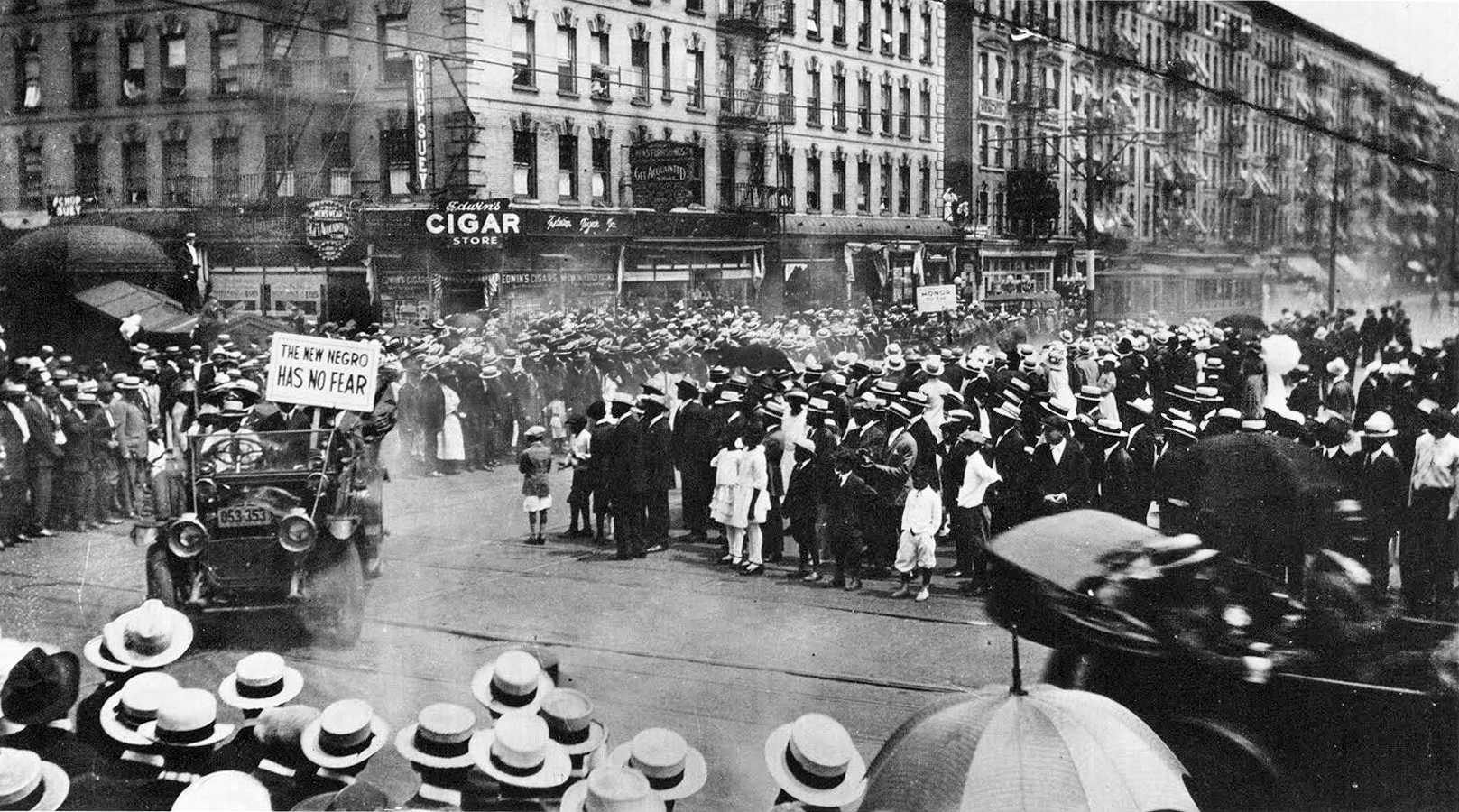
A Universal Negro Improvement Association parade in Harlem in 1920. A sign on a car says "The New Negro Has No Fear".

By 1920 the association had over 1,900 divisions in more than 40 countries. Most of the divisions were located in the United States, which had become the UNIA's base of operations. There were, however, offices in several Caribbean countries, with Cuba having the most. Divisions also existed in Central and South America: Panama, Costa Rica, Nicaragua, Ecuador, and Venezuela; in Africa: Gold Coast (now Ghana), Sierra Leone, Liberia, Nigeria, South West Africa (now Namibia), and the Union of South Africa; and in India and Australia.

For the entire month of August 1920, the UNIA-ACL held its first international convention at Madison Square Garden in New York City. The 20,000 attending members promulgated "The Declaration of Rights of the Negro Peoples of the World" on August 13, 1920, and elected the leaders of the UNIA as "leaders for the Negro people of the world".

"Explanation of the Objects of the Universal Negro Improvement Association"
Complete 1921 speech

The organization put forth a program based on this declaration, marking the evolution of the movement as one promoting black nationalism. It sought the uplift of the black race and encouraged self-reliance and nationhood. Among the declarations was one proclaiming the red, black and green flag as the official banner of the African race. (Beginning in the 1960s, black nationalists and Pan-Africanists adopted the same flag as the Black Liberation Flag.) UNIA-ACL officially designated the song "Ethiopia, Thou Land of Our Fathers" as the official anthem of "Africa and the Africans, at home and Abroad".

Under the provisions of the UNIA constitution, Gabriel Johnson was elected Supreme Potentate; G. O. Marke, Supreme Deputy Potentate; J. W. [H]. Eason, leader of the fifteen million "Negroes" of the United States of America; and Henrietta Vinton Davis, International Organizer. Garvey was elected "Provisional President of Africa", a mostly ceremonial title. George Alexander McGuire, an Episcopal priest, was elected as the first chaplain-general of the UNIA.

McGuire wrote two important documents for the organization: "Universal Negro Ritual" and "Universal Negro Catechism". For these he drew from his interest and knowledge of religion and race history. In Philadelphia, where he had earlier been the rector of St. Thomas Episcopal Church, McGuire had been an early member of the American Negro Historical Society.

The opening parade was one of the most striking features of the 1920 convention. It began outside the UNIA headquarters on West 135th Street, went uptown as far as 145th and downtown as far as 125th Street, taking it beyond the boundaries of black residence into white areas. Four mounted policemen, and the heads of Black Star Line and Negro Factories Corporation, led the parade, followed by cars carrying Garvey and Mayor of Monrovia, capital of Liberia, and other UNIA officials, then the Black Star Line Choir, on foot, and contingents from throughout US and Caribbean, Canada, Nigeria, carrying banners, and including 12 bands, with about 500 cars bringing up the rear. Similar dramatic parades were featured in the 1922 and 1924 conventions. Many photographs survive of the 1924 Convention Parade, as Garvey employed noted photographer James Van Der Zee to record the event.

Even after Garvey had left Harlem (he was imprisoned in 1925 and deported to Jamaica in 1927), the UNIA paraded each August throughout the 1920s, with the place of honour given to portraits of their absent leader. The crowds were transfixed by the spectacle of uniformed UNIA members, particularly the African Legion and Black Cross Nurses.

According to the preamble of the 1929 constitution as amended, the UNIA is a

social, friendly, humanitarian, charitable, educational, institutional, constructive and expansive society, and is founded by persons desiring to do the utmost to work for the general uplift of the people of African ancestry of the world. And the members pledge themselves to do all in their power to conserve the rights of their noble race and to respect the rights of all mankind, believing always in the Brotherhood of Man and the Fatherhood of God. The motto of the organization is 'One God! One Aim! One Destiny!' Therefore, let justice be done to all mankind, realizing that if the strong oppresses the weak, confusion and discontent will ever mark the path of man but with love, faith and charity towards all the reign of peace and plenty will be heralded into the world and the generations of men shall be called Blessed.

== Liberian program ==
Although UNIA was not solely a "Back to Africa" movement, the organization did work to arrange for emigration for African Americans who wanted to go there. In late 1923, an official UNIA delegation that included Robert Lincoln Poston and Henrietta Vinton Davis traveled to Liberia to survey potential land sites for possible purchase. They also assessed the general condition of the country from the standpoint of UNIA members interested in living in Africa.

By 1924 the Chief Justice J. J. Dossen of Liberia wrote to UNIA conveying the government's support:

The President directs me to say in reply to your letter of June 8 setting forth the objects and purposes of the Universal Negro Improvement Association, that the Government of Liberia, appreciating as they do the aims of your organization as outlined by you, have no hesitancy in assuring you that they will afford the Association every facility legally possible in effectuating in Liberia its industrial, agricultural and business projects.

About two months later, however, the Liberian President unexpectedly ordered all Liberian ports to refuse entry to any member of the "Garvey Movement". This action closely followed the Firestone Rubber Company's agreement with Liberia for a 99-year lease of one million acres (4,000 km^{2}) of land. It was extracting and processing rubber for the world market. This land deal had been assisted by American and European governments. Originally Liberia had intended to lease the land to UNIA at an unprecedented dollar an acre ($247/km^{2}). The commercial agreement with Firestone Tire dealt a severe blow to the UNIA's African repatriation program and inspired speculation that the actions were linked.

The UNIA flag (also known as the Pan-African flag and Black Nationalist Flag) uses three colors: red, black and green.

== Post-Garvey era ==
After Garvey's conviction and imprisonment on mail fraud charges in 1925 and deportation to Jamaica in 1927, the organization began to take on a different character. In 1926, George Weston succeeded Garvey in a UNIA Convention Election, becoming the second elected President-General of the UNIA, Inc. Many Garvey supporters were angered, and split off into rival entities such as the "Garvey Clubs" and other organizations, based on members' differing interpretation of the original aims and objects of the UNIA.

But the UNIA continued to be officially recognized as the "Universal Negro Improvement Association and African Communities League". A rival "UNIA-ACL August 1929 of the World" emerged, headed by Marcus Garvey after his deportation to Jamaica.

Garvey appointed Maymie de Mena as his official representative to head the American field after his ouster to Jamaica. She was a fiery orator and spoke both Spanish and English, helping with the spread of the organization through Latin America and the Caribbean.

=== The UNIA Inc ===
The UNIA, Inc., after Garvey's departure, continued to operate out of New York until 1941. After Weston's 1926 election to President-General, he was succeeded by Frederick Augustus Toote (1929), Clifford Bourne (1930), Lionel Antonio Francis (1931–34), Henrietta Vinton Davis (1934–40), Lionel Antonio Francis (1940–61), Captain A. L. King (1961–81) and Milton Kelly, Jr. (1981–2007).

In a historic 1939 British Supreme Court decision, President-General Francis was recognized as the rightful administrative heir to the huge Sir Isaiah Emmanuel Morter (DSOE) Estate in Belize. The organization's administrative headquarters were shifted to Belize in 1941 when the President-General relocated there from New York.

Upon Francis's death in 1961 during Hurricane Hattie, the presidency shifted back to New York under the leadership of Captain A. L. King, formerly president of the Central Division of the UNIA in New York. After his death in the early 1980s, longtime Garveyite organizer Milton Kelly, Jr. assumed the administrative reins and continued to head the association until 2007.

=== The UNIA-ACL 1929 of the World ===
The UNIA 1929 headed by Garvey continued operating in Jamaica until he moved to England in 1935. There he set up office for the parent body of the UNIA 1929 and maintained contact with all its divisions. UNIA 1929 conventions were held in Canada in 1936, 1937, and 1938. The 1937 sessions were highlighted by the introduction of the first course of African philosophy conducted by Garvey.

Garvey became ill in January 1940, and died on June 10, 1940. UNIA members worldwide participated in eulogies, memorial services and processions in his honor. Secretary-General Ethel Collins briefly managed the affairs of the UNIA from New York until a successor to Garvey could be formally installed to complete his term as President-General.

During an emergency commissioners' conference in June 1940, James R. Stewart, a commissioner from Ohio and graduate of the course of African philosophy, was named the successor. In the months to follow, the Parent Body of the UNIA was moved from its temporary headquarters in New York to Cleveland. In October 1940 the New Negro World started publishing out of Cleveland. After the 1942 International Convention in Cleveland, a rehabilitating committee of disgruntled members was held in New York during September.

=== Parent Body in Monrovia ===
Stewart moved to Monrovia, Liberia, in 1949. He took Liberian citizenship and moved the Parent Body of the UNIA there. He continued to lead the Association as President-General until his death in 1964. Stewart and his entire family relocated deeper into the interior of the country, establishing themselves in Gbandela, Bong County, Liberia. There they established a hospital, school and farm.

When Stewart died from cancer in 1964, the Parent Body was moved from Monrovia to Youngstown, Ohio, where James A. Bennett took the reins. In 1968 Bennett was succeeded by Vernon Wilson.

After President-General Wilson's death in 1975, Mason Harvgrave became next President General. Hargrave testified during United States congressional hearings in August 1987 in relation to the proposed exoneration of Marcus Garvey on charges of mail fraud. The findings of the Judiciary Committee were: Garvey was innocent of the charges against him. Although the Committee determined he had been found guilty earlier due to the social climate of America at the time, they had no legal basis upon which to exonerate a person who had died.

After President General Hargrave died in 1988, all his papers and other Parent Body material were turned over to the Western Reserve Historical Society in Cleveland, Ohio, for safe-keeping. From 1988 until the 2024, Cleo Miller, Jr. has held the title of President General. Per the 2024 UNIA Convention in Washington, D.C., the Honorable Mwariama Kamau is now currently President-General of the UNIA.

== Notable members of the UNIA ==
- Dusé Mohamed Ali
- Amy Ashwood Garvey
- John Edward Bruce
- Eliezer Cadet
- Alvinus Calder
- Henrietta Vinton Davis
- William H. Ferris
- Arnold Josiah Ford
- Timothy Thomas Fortune
- Amy Jacques Garvey
- Marcus Garvey
- Octavius C. Granady
- St. William Grant
- Hubert Henry Harrison
- Thomas Watson Harvey
- Samuel Alfred Haynes
- Hubert Julian
- Louise Little
- Maymie de Mena
- George Alexander McGuire
- Isaiah Emmanuel Morter
- Solomon Plaatje
- Robert Lincoln Poston
- Alice S. Presto
- Thomas Vincent Ramos
- James Robert Stewart
- Eric D. Walrond
