= Maymie de Mena =

American activist (1879–1953)

- 1925 visa photograph
- Born: Leonie Turpeau; December 10, 1879 near St. Martinville, Louisiana
- Died: October 23, 1953 (aged 73); Chicago, Illinois
- Other names: M. L. T. de Mena, Madame de Mena, Maymie Leona Turpeau de Mena, Maymie L. de Mena Turpeau, Maymie Turpeau de Mena, Maymie Ebimber, Maymie Aiken
- Occupation: activist
- Years active: 1925–53
- Known for: first woman officer-in-charge of the Universal Negro Improvement Association

Maymie de Mena (December 10, 1879 – October 23, 1953, also known as Maymie Aiken or Madame DeMena Aiken in her later career) was an American-born activist who became one of the highest-ranking officers in the Universal Negro Improvement Association (UNIA). She has been credited with keeping the organization alive after Marcus Garvey's conviction for mail fraud and deportation from the United States.

De Mena was born into a Creole family in St. Martin Parish, Louisiana, and obtained her education in the United States before marrying a Nicaraguan and moving to Central America. After a decade in which she raised a daughter and taught school, she divorced, returned to the U.S., and joined the UNIA. Quickly rising in the ranks from a translator, because she was fluent in Spanish, de Mena became one of the leaders of the pan-African movement. She was responsible for increasing the membership of the organization in the Caribbean and Latin America. When Garvey was deported from the U.S. to Jamaica, de Mena became Garvey's official representative in New York and was the first woman to carry such a high distinction in the organization.

After Garvey moved to London, de Mena, now remarried and styling herself as Madame Aiken, directed her attentions to women's and children's issues in Jamaica. She fought for women's suffrage and birth control rights, while establishing trade organizations to assist working-class women in improving their economic status.

== Early life ==
Leonie Turpeau was born on December 10, 1879, on a farm on the eastern banks of Bayou Teche near St. Martinville, St. Martin Parish, Louisiana, to Isabella Hill (née Regis or Reggis) and Michel Turpeau Jr. (Note: In the papers of the Universal Negro Improvement Association de Mena's biographical notes are distorted. Her birth is shown as 1891; her birth place is shown as San Carlos, Nicaragua; her first husband, Francisco Hiberto Mena, is shown as her father; her mother's name is altered slightly—from Regis to Regist; and her father, Michel Turpeau, is shown as her first husband, among other misidentifications. This information has been repeated in other sources, without confirmation from primary records. De Mena sometimes gave correct information in primary records, such as her passenger information in 1912 which gave her birth place as St. Martinville and her nationality as "Nicaraguan by marriage" and sometimes gave incorrect information, such as documents which show her birth year as 1879, 1889 or 1891. After 1919, de Mena usually listed her birth year as 1891 or 1892.) Her paternal grandfather, Michel Turpeau Sr. was a free man of color from Martinique who had worked as a ship hand and later on the Banker plantation, enabling him to buy a small parcel of land and bring his French Guianese wife, Odeline "Dina", to Louisiana. Turpaeu's mother was the daughter of Maturin Regis, who had been a slave in Virginia, and Carrie Hill a Louisiana Creole woman. The marriage between Michael Jr. and Isabella caused disquiet from its beginnings, as Louisiana society typically did not approve of freedmen marrying former slaves.

Turpeau was the seventh sibling in the family. Her biography in the Garvey collection shows that she was privately educated and also studied at the Metropolitan Business College of New York City, the Greensboro Commercial College at Greensboro, North Carolina and at the University of New Orleans. The University of New Orleans was not founded until 1956, but Carrie, Turpeau's older sister studied at the Gilbert Academy, an agricultural/industrial college founded for freedmen which later became part of the distinct New Orleans University. Records of the university show three alumni between 1895 and 1917 with the surname Turpeau: Carrie B. who graduated in 1899, Angella (a younger sister) who graduated in 1906 both from the College of Liberal Arts, and Mary L. (née Turpeau) Thompson, later Hammett who graduated in 1899 from the normal school. Both Carrie and Mary L. Turpeau were from St. Martinville. (Note: It is unknown if Mary L. Turpeau is Maymie Leonie. The Mary who attended New Orleans University married Kershaw T. Thompson on December 10, 1900, in New Orleans and gave her father's name as Turpeau and mother's name as Belle Turpeau. The bride was 21 years old. One of the witnesses to the marriage was Belle Anderson. A newspaper notice of the marriage shows that the bride's name was May Turpeau. Maymie's sister Angella's death record shows that Angella's mother was Isabel Regis Anderson. Yearbook references for New Orleans University show Mary L. Thompson became Mary L. Hammett in 1908.)

Reconstruction and rioting, coupled with the implementation of Jim Crow laws in Louisiana led most of the Turpeau family to leave the area and become professionals in the north. David DeWitt became a well-known preacher and a member of the Ohio House of Representatives and his daughter, Leontine T. Kelly born in Washington, D.C. was the first black woman bishop of the United Methodist Church. George remained in Louisiana, living in Lake Charles, which was very near Jennings, the destination of several of Turpeau's future trips from Nicaragua.

Turpeau, rather than moving north, chose to go south to Bluefields, Nicaragua, with her new husband Francisco Hiberto Mena (aka Francis or Frank in English sources), a Creole planter, activist, and newspaperman. When or where they met or married is unknown. On May 12, 1912, Maymie Leona Turpeau de Mena, as she now styled herself, sailed on the S.S. Dictator from Bluefields, to New Orleans. Her passenger record showed she was heading to visit her sister in Jennings, Louisiana, was born in St. Martinville, and stated her nationality was "Nicaraguan by marriage". By the time de Mena arrived in Bluefields, the Mosquito Coast had transitioned from a British protectorate to a Nicaraguan capital city of the Zelaya Department with strong commercial ties to the United States. The society was stratified with white North Americans at the highest social positions followed by Mestizos and upper class Creoles, European mixed-race elites. Those with darker skins from Asia, the Caribbean, and indigenous people held lower status. Though de Mena styled herself as Spanish American, she would have been considered as part of the Afro-Caribbean diaspora.

== Fluid identity ==
At the time de Mena married Francisco Mena, U.S. law held that she lost her American citizenship and acquired her husband's. Until the Cable Act was passed in 1922, she would not have been able to reacquire American citizenship. Thus, her statements that she was "Nicaraguan by marriage" were accurate, unless she had petitioned the Naturalization Bureau to regain her citizenship. Since she used her Nicaraguan passport in 1926 to attain a Pullman berth, she had not re-nationalized at that time. In 1936, another U.S. law was passed which allowed women who had lost their citizenship by marrying a foreigner between 1907 and 1922 to forgo a petition of naturalization, only if their spouse had died or the couple had divorced and if the woman was willing to swear an oath of allegiance. But by this time, de Mena had already married a Cameroonian and a Jamaican. Though French law, under whose jurisdiction part of Cameroon fell, was amended in 1927 to allow women to maintain their citizenship upon marriage, the laws of Nicaragua and Britain, under whose jurisdiction both the remainder of Cameroon and Jamaica fell, still held in 1933 that a woman lost her citizenship upon remarriage and became an alien with the citizenship of her spouse.

Though not native to Nicaragua, having lived in the stratified social order of a Hispanic country, de Mena was able to empathize with Afro-Latina discontent in her travels through Latin America for UNIA and she spoke their language. De Mena's identity shifted as needed. When she was denied a berth on a Pullman car, de Mena used her Nicaraguan passport to gain one. On ship passenger manifests, she claimed to be African, colored, Negro, Spanish American, West Indian, and white on various voyages and was known to travel on both a Nicaraguan and British passport. On the other hand, some men in the UNIA challenged her leadership as a foreigner. She was also investigated by the Federal Bureau of Investigation for her activities and relationships with foreigners. De Mena, dedicated to the cause of improving her race, used her shifting identity for political expediency. Natanya Duncan, even observed that she chose her husbands based on whether they could advance the cause of racial improvement and disposed of them when they became either a liability or did not support her aims.

== Career ==
=== Nicaragua ===
While de Mena may have been involved with the Universal Negro Improvement Association (UNIA) in Bluefields, as she later claimed, there is no documentation confirming her participation in the organization in Nicaragua. UNIA, founded by Marcus Garvey in 1914, was a Pan-African movement with the dual goals of bringing self-authority to black people worldwide and taking possession of Africa as a Negro right. De Mena's husband was a member of the Union Club, serving as its vice president for several terms in the 1920s, which would have granted her access to the Creole elite circles. He also was involved with the Bluefields Weekly, a local English-language newspaper. Both served as mechanisms for political mobilization of the Creole populations and though women were not allowed to be members of the club, they were active in organizing political influence. In 1913, de Mena listed her occupation on a trip home as nurse but in the four following years, she styled herself as a housewife. She also made a trip that year to Panama, to give birth to her daughter Berniza I. Mena who was born in Panama City on February 26, 1913. (Note: Berniza's marriage license shows her father's name to be Carlos Mena. There was a C. Mena from Bluefields, who was employed by the Cristobal Coaling Station in 1919, but no other evidence of him is available nor is there any indication of ties to Berniza or her mother. No records were found in a search to place Mayme de Mena or Francis H./Francisco Hiberto Mena in Panama at the time of Berniza's birth.) In 1917, de Mena showed her occupation as clerk and in 1919 La Información newspaper ran an advertisement for a school run by de Mena in which she taught English, French, bookkeeping, music, shorthand and typing. In 1922, de Mena returned to the United States with her daughter. The passenger manifest showed she was divorced. She would settle near her family members in Chicago.

=== United States ===
Around the time that de Mena returned to the U.S., a convention was taking place at Liberty Hall, the headquarters of UNIA in Harlem. The organization's structure was patriarchal, with clear delineation of gendered roles. Women were meant to be virtuous married mothers, in need of protection and men their gallant protectors and warriors. Though not on the 1922 agenda, the women's delegation raised a set of resolutions hoping to gain more autonomy, leadership positions and authority without male oversight. Marcus Garvey amended the resolutions so that they had little real effect, but the event marked a turning point and a rise in women in leadership in the organization. By 1929 though the organization was in decline, 39.5% of the delegates were women, rising to 49.1% in 1938. In various ways, women begin to split with the UNIA philosophies on issues that they felt strongly about, such as a woman's right to control her own child-bearing and use of birth control, as well as women's opposition to their lack of political power. De Mena's leadership of the UNIA, as a single mother, "proved that [women] were intellectually equipped to be local leaders as well as transnational policy makers within the organization". Soon after the convention, Garvey was arrested on charges of mail fraud involving the Black Star Line's scheme to bring American Negros "home" to Liberia. He was imprisoned and given a five-year sentence, but appealed his conviction and was released on bond.

De Mena joined the UNIA in Chicago and in 1924 was sent as a delegate to the annual convention in Harlem. At the convention, she asked the leadership to recognize the Daughters of Ethiopia, an honorary group making contributions to racial improvement, as an official auxiliary of the UNIA. By gaining the organization's approval, women members of the UNIA gained recognition of their contributions. In 1925, Henrietta Vinton Davis organized a tour of the Caribbean and was accompanied by de Mena, who was to serve as both translator and organizer on the trip. De Mena proved successful in both fund raising and recruiting new members, and her language skills with Spanish were rewarded with a higher salary than Davis'. By the time the women returned, now enjoying a reputation as a motivational speaker, de Mena was asked to join Garvey on stage on July 5, 1925, to call for unity. Garvey lost his appeal on his fraud case that same year and was remanded to the Atlanta Penitentiary. Throughout the summer and fall of that year, de Mena accompanied Amy Jacques-Garvey on a speaking tour covering many major cities in the Midwest, along the Atlantic coast and to New Orleans. The tour solidified her place in Garvey's inner circle. At the emergency convention of 1926, de Mena was elected as assistant international organizer and the following year succeeded Davis as the fourth vice president general, becoming Garvey's official representative. She kept in close contact with him both through correspondence and visits despite her travel schedule. Upon Garvey's release from prison in 1927 and his deportation to Jamaica, de Mena led a celebratory UNIA parade through Kingston. Perched on a horse and brandishing a sword, she was a visible symbol of the crusading woman.

In 1928, de Mena married a Cameroonian medical student, Milton Tube Ebimber, who had studied in Germany, Japan and China and spoke several African, Asian, and European languages. He was studying medicine at Columbia University when they married. Their opulent wedding, in which the bride was given away by her brother, David DeWitt Turpeau, was held at UNIA's Liberty Hall headquarters attracting wide coverage in the black newspapers. Soon after the marriage, Ebimber was arrested and imprisoned in the New York State Penitentiary on charges of bigamy. In 1929, she once again used de Mena as her surname. Beginning in 1928 and until her shift to Father Divine's movement, de Mena was the most visible officer in the UNIA. She was the key to increasing membership in the organization in the Spanish-speaking Caribbean and southern American regions. When Garvey reorganized the movement in 1929, she became the international organizer and the officer in charge of the Americas. She was seated on the dais at the convention that year and on its conclusion returned to the United States as its official representative. The following year, Garvey appointed de Mena officer-in-charge of North America and his personal representative in the U.S., as he had formally split with UNIA, Inc. in New York and created the Universal Negro Improvement Association and African Communities League of the World operating out of Jamaica. De Mena's "forceful, riveting and entrancing style" played a key role in keeping the movement alive after Garvey's deportation from the U.S. When Davis left the movement in 1931, de Mena became the sole leader, though many challenged her authority. Around the same time, de Mena reorganized the Costa Rican Port Limón branch of the UNIA, after factionalism had created a local branch which vied for authority with the parent organization.

As director of the UNIA's newspaper Negro World from 1932, de Mena worked with Jacques-Garvey to create a ladies' page, breaking new ground at the time. Jacques-Garvey had introduced "Our Women and What They Think", with articles focused on women's activism, rather than on fashion or household tips. They used the voice of the Negro World to give members of the African diaspora a different narrative than the racially inferior images commonly presented in the press. In the racially charged environment of the 1930s, black women were often depicted as sexually immoral. Through the ladies' page articles, women were encouraged to uplift the race through motherhood; the articles helped to change the perception of Afro-Caribbean women by asserting the women's respectability. In Costa Rica, where they had been denied citizenship, West Indian women argued that they were fit to become citizens. Chapters of UNIA sprang up in countries from Brazil through Mexico and across the West Indies. Though Caribbean migrants to the areas accounted for some of the membership, not all of those interested in Garveyism were immigrants from the West Indies. The Negro World had a Spanish section which ran news about issues affecting Afro-Latinos. Under de Mena's leadership it was decidedly feminist. She exhorted members to fight for women's rights and throw off the restrictions of assigned roles.

=== Jamaica ===
On 11 June 1932, de Mena married Percy Aiken, a Jamaican contractor and activist, who would become an officer in the island's Baháʼí Faith. Garvey tried to bring the UNIA back to its former status from Jamaica, continuing to write articles for the Negro World and developing two other short-lived papers, The Blackman and The New Jamaican, but all had folded by 1933. In 1934, now adopting her new husband's surname and styled as "Madame Aiken" she began a newspaper using the presses of the Negro World called the World Echo. While the paper ostensibly was to be another organ for UNIA, many of the articles were devoted to Father Divine's Peace Mission. Aiken used the paper to call for anti-lynching legislation and championed African-American civil rights, including liberation in "spiritual, economic, political and industrial emancipation". Father Divine's movement was in direct opposition to Garvey's, in that Garvey pressed for racial consciousness and purity, while Divine argued that race was unimportant and that blacks had to integrate into the larger society. The opposing voices of these two movements were difficult for Aiken and other members of the diaspora to reconcile. She finally closed both the newspaper and UNIA's offices in New York, moving to Jamaica in 1935. Though she continued some involvement with UNIA through the 1950s, the organization was in decline. Garvey's financial problems resulted in the foreclosure of his home, and by 1935, he permanently relocated to London. Around the same time, Aiken withdrew her support from Father Divine and restyled the World Echo into the Ethiopian World. Though many deserted Garvey, Aiken maintained a good relationship with him until his death.

Aiken was increasingly involved in social work, joining the Women's Liberal Club and the Trade Unions Council. She supported a variety of causes including the improvement of conditions for children and orphans, hygiene and licensing regulations for beauticians, care facilities for the elderly, better schools, and controlling government waste. Aiken served as Secretary of the Save the Children organization and was a member of its executive board up to her death. She was also involved in the birth control movement alongside other reformers like Amy Bailey and May Farquharson. She believed that until women could plan the size of their own families, they would not be able to improve the economic, educational, or moral status of the black community as they would be unable to devote quality support to large numbers of children. She joined the Bustamante Industrial Trade Union (BITU) and though the organization largely excluded women, she pressed for social and economic improvements for women. Aiken also helped establish a trade union for seamstresses, co-founded the Housecraft Training Center and was the only woman to serve on the Trade Unions Council.

In 1939, when Mary Morris Knibb launched her bid for a seat on the Kingston/Saint Andrew Parish Council, Aiken was a staunch supporter and campaigner. Upon Knibb's victory, Aiken rallied UNIA and other organizations for a victory celebration for the first woman elected to any political office in Jamaica. That same year, she made a trip back to the U.S., in part to console one of her sisters who was ailing, but also to visit the Birth Control Research Bureau, attend lectures at Howard University and participate in roundtable discussions with the National Woman's Party. When Garvey died in 1940 and the following year the Commissioner of the UNIA in Jamaica resigned, Aiken was put forward as a replacement. She continued to press for women's political participation, entering the local elections herself in 1947. Though she did not win, she encouraged others to vote for women candidates.

In 1949, Aiken became president of the Garvey Division of the UNIA and served in that capacity until her resignation in July of the following year. She was finally appointed by UNIA Inc. in New York as the Commissioner for Cuba, Central America and Jamaica in 1952. She was the current president of the Women's Liberal Club when she boarded a ship in September 1953 to see a doctor in the U.S.

== Death and legacy ==
Aiken died on October 23, 1953, from cancer and was buried in the Graceland Cemetery in Chicago. The year after Aiken's death, a portrait of her was unveiled by Lady Foot, wife of Governor Foot and donated to the Housecraft Training Center, a facility co-founded by Aiken to teach domestic science.
