= Vivian Seay =

British Honduran nurse, social reformer and activist

Vivian Wilhelmina Myvett Seay (1881–1971) was a British Honduran nurse, social reformer and activist. Seay, Creole and of the middle class, attended the Anglican Church school and earned her teaching credentials in the pupil-teacher program. In 1920, she founded the country's Black Cross Nurses and led the group until she died, 51 years later. A social activist, the legalization of divorce in Belize is partially attributed to her work. In 1951, she was the only woman founder of the National Party and she was the country's second woman citizen to be honored as Member of the Order of the British Empire.

== Biography ==
Vivian Wilhelmina Myvett was born in British Honduras in 1881 to Francis and Margaret Myvett, a middle-class Creole family. She attended the Anglican Church school and then at 16 entered the pupil-teaching system for a small salary. which allowed her to further her education in exchange for teaching, which would lead to her certification as an educator four years later. Earning her teacher certification, she taught in the Mayan village of Xcalak, Mexico for nine years. During this time, in 1905, she married Elizah Fitzgerald Seay. Returning to Belize by 1918, two years later she founded the British Honduran chapter of the Black Cross Nurses (BCN). She led a survey in 1920 on infant and maternal mortality which led to nursing training programs for which she actively recruited nurse trainees. By 1923, there were twenty-four trained nurses which Seay assigned to various areas in Belize Town as volunteers, since they were unpaid. The BCN members visited the homes of the poor in their assigned areas and provided proper parenting training, instruction on sanitation, midwifery services, and general welfare work. In 1928, Seay and four other BCN members completed their formal midwife training at the Belize Hospital.

Seay led the BCN to assist victims of the 1931 Belize hurricane and organized a program to provide meals for school children. In 1933, she campaigned for a male candidate, who was running for the Belize Town Board and was rewarded with her own appointment as its first female member. One of her first recommendations was the creation of a registry for working women, so that they could enter their specialties, such as child care providers, cooks, maids, laundresses and would not have to go door to door in search of work. The idea failed, but she followed it up in 1934 with a proposal for the Palace Theatre to assist in an unemployment fund in conjunction with the BCN, which would provide groceries to needy families. For her loyalty and steadfastness in the midst of the anti-colonial labor unrest of 1934, Seay was awarded by Governor Alan Burns as a Member of the Order of the British Empire, becoming the country's second woman citizen to be honored when she accepted the presentation in 1935. She argued in favor of divorce, as a countermeasure to adultery and illegitimacy, and when legalization occurred in 1935, Seay's activism was credited in large part with its passage. That same year, when the Women's League and Labourers and Unemployed Association (LUA) women demanded suffrage, Seay spoke in opposition. While she was in favor of lowering women's voting age to twenty-one, she was not in favor of enfranchising poor women, who were in her view "the rowdy popular classes". As a means of combating opposition from LUA and the Women's League, Seay proposed that unemployed women be granted land, houses, and training to learn to farm and provide for their families, but the plan was rejected by the Colonial Office.

In 1938, Seay and the BCN conducted a survey of working-class families which was presented to the West India Royal Commission. The report focused on male-led households, minimizing the situation of female-headed families, but confirmed poor housing conditions and diets, as well as high unemployment among “poor respectable families” in Belize Town. In 1941, Seay became a public employee, accepting the position as Inspector of Midwives and then seven years later became the first female British Honduran Justice of the Peace. Throughout the 1940s, Seay supported the anti-nationalist goals of the administration and then in 1951, became the only woman founder of the National Party, which formed to contest severing ties with Britain. That same year, she accepted an appointment to the City Council when the governor dissolved the existing council. In 1952 Shea was a co-founder of the British Honduras Federation of Women, which began a project to provide an inexpensive daycare center for the children of working women. She remained active in opposition politics throughout the 1960s.

Seay died in 1971 and was credited for her many years as a nurse, social reformer and activist. She was posthumously honored with a street which bears her name and a postage stamp bearing her likeness.

== Bibliography ==
- Appelbaum, Nancy P.; Macpherson, Anne S.; Rosemblatt, Karin Alejandra (2003). Race and Nation in Modern Latin America. Univ of North Carolina Press. ISBN 978-0-8078-5441-9.
- Appiah, Anthony; Gates, Henry Louis (2005). Africana: The Encyclopedia of the African and African American Experience. Oxford University Press. ISBN 978-0-19-517055-9.
- Emery, Robert E. (24 January 2013). Cultural Sociology of Divorce: An Encyclopedia. SAGE Publications. ISBN 978-1-4522-7443-0.
- Garvey, Marcus (15 July 2011). The Marcus Garvey and Universal Negro Improvement Association Papers, Volume XI: The Caribbean Diaspora, 1910–1920. Duke University Press. ISBN 978-0-8223-4690-6.
- Macpherson, Anne S. (1998). 'Those Men Were So Coward': The Gender Politics of Social Movements and State Formation in Belize, 1912-1982. University of Wisconsin--Madison.
- Macpherson, Anne S. (November 2003). "Colonial Matriarchs: Garveyism, Maternalism, and Belize's Black Cross Nurses, 1920-1952". Gender & History. 15 (3). Hoboken, New Jersey: Wiley-Blackwell: 507–527. doi:10.1111/j.0953-5233.2003.00318.x. ISSN 0953-5233. S2CID 144192762.
- Macpherson, Anne S. (2007). "Vivian Seay" (PDF). Harvard College, Cambridge, Massachusetts: W.E. B. DuBois Research Institute at the Hutchins Center.
- Macpherson, Anne S. (2007). From Colony to Nation: Women Activists and the Gendering of Politics in Belize, 1912-1982 (PDF). Lincoln, Nebraska: University of Nebraska Press. ISBN 978-0-8032-0626-7.
- Mayr, Renate Johanna (2014). Belize: Tracking the Path of Its History: From the Heart of the Mayan Empire to a Retreat for Buccaneers, a Safe-Haven for Ex-Pirates and Pioneers, a Crown Colony and a Modern Nation. LIT Verlag Münster. ISBN 978-3-643-90481-2.
- Steward, Lucy; Thomas, Elwin, eds. (1996). Caribbean Issues and Developments: Teacher Education in the Commonwealth. London, England: Commonwealth Secretariat. ISBN 978-0-85092-460-2.
