= Black Cross Nurses =

Non-profit organization

Universal African Black Cross Nurses
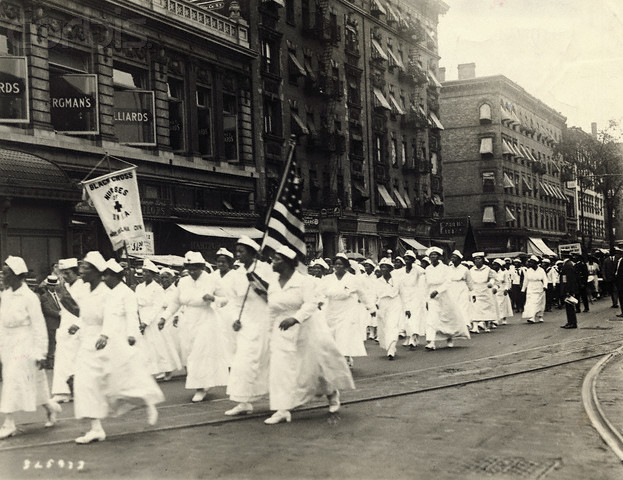
- 1 August 1922, Manhattan, New York – "Black Cross Nurses in the giant parade through Harlem which today opened the thirty-day annual world convention of the Universal Negro Improvement Association (UNIA)"
- Founded: 1920
- Founder: Henrietta Vinton Davis
- Type: Non-governmental organization, Non-profit organization
- Purpose: Humanitarian
- Location: Philadelphia, Pennsylvania, US
- Region served: Worldwide
- Method: Aid
- Website: www.cbpm.org/blackcrossnurses.html

Black Cross Nurses (officially the Universal African Black Cross Nurses) is an international organization of nurses which was founded in 1920, based upon the model of the Red Cross. The organization was the women's auxiliary of the Universal Negro Improvement Association and African Communities League and was established to provide health services and education to people of African descent.

== History ==
In 1920, Henrietta Vinton Davis established the Black Cross Nurses (BCN) in Philadelphia as an auxiliary of the Universal Negro Improvement Association and African Communities League (UNIA). The BCN served as the women's auxiliary of the UNIA, placing women in a supportive role, while the men's auxiliary served in a protective role. Marcus Garvey wanted everyone in the UNIA to feel they belonged within the organization, and the BCN served that purpose for women.

The BCN was based on the World War I nursing model of the Red Cross. Local chapters were established with a matron, head nurse, secretary and treasurer to provide health services and hygiene education to black members of the community. Few programs existed which would admit people of African descent into nursing training at the time and many health facilities provided unequal care to black patrons; one of the goals of the organization was addressing these discrepancies. Doctors, nurses and lay practitioners took courses ranging from six months to a year to make sure that standardized care was being given. In addition, upon graduation from the course, each member was required to purchase and wear their official uniform.

In many ways, the organization functioned as a social reform movement, while developing role models for young women. It promoted education, good health and hygiene, juvenile rehabilitation, maternal and infant care, and training in proper nutrition. It also provided a professional, organized structure for members, giving them a means to appear in roles of public leadership. In articles which appeared in the Negro World, nurses addressed a wide variety of topics from advice to expectant mothers to contagious diseases, heart disease, and hygiene, as well as descriptions of the conditions, symptoms, and treatment options. Benevolent community service included distributing clothing and food to those in need.

== Requirements ==
The requirements of membership were that the women be active members of the UNIA, between 15 and 45 years old and "of Negro blood and African descent". Nurses were also required to be able to read and write in order to promote literacy in their communities and serve as examples to others. As an overriding goal, the organization used social health concerns to uplift the black race from degeneracy, believing that by creating a sanitary living environment, the community would prosper. Units quickly formed in cities across the United States, as well as in The Caribbean and Central America.

== Growth of the UNIA ==
In the early 1920s, the United States UNIA organizations spread into thirty-eight states, and membership in the Black Cross Nurses was in the tens of thousands. The largest branch in the world was located in Harlem. Within a few years of the formal organization of the Black Cross Nurses, there were chapters in Alabama, Chicago, California, Georgia, Louisiana, New Jersey, New York, and Virginia, with international chapters in Belize, Nova Scotia, Panama, Trinidad and Tobago. By 1927, membership had declined, but the Black Cross Nurses provided education for African-American nurses and health care access to African Americans in their communities through the 1960s.

== Culture ==
All white uniforms including dress, shoes, stockings and a cap adorned with a black cross encircled by a red background with a green center were worn for dress and official functions. Duty uniforms, consisted of a green dress over which was worn an ivory apron accompanied by black shoes and stockings, set the BCN nurses apart from other nurses and united them as symbolically as members. Green was chosen as a representation of growth and renewal. Criticism of the dress and cape stemmed from a comparison to a nun's habit, while UNIA men's uniforms resembled military attire.

Ancillary responsibilities of the BCN included singing in a choir and marching in parades. Choir rehearsals were on Friday. Marching practice was necessary as local chapters participated in parades on holidays such as Memorial Day and the Fourth of July, sometimes carrying the Black Nationalist flag.

At a time in history when the words "black people" were unpopular to use, the nurses were instilling pridefulness to be black, both in their community and families. These were values passed down by Marcus Garvey's teachings for BCN. Families were involved in the UNIA meeting halls where there would be food for attendees. Many different classes were taught, as well as many different activities and celebrations for the community. The community was the culture for the UNIA and the BCN, coming together to support one another.

== International chapters ==
=== Belize ===
The Belize Black Cross Nurses organization was established in British Honduras in 1920 by Vivian Seay, who led the organization until her death in 1971. Dr. K. Simon, medical officer for the Cayo District, moved to Belize Town in 1921, and began instructing members of the UNIA in midwifery, to combat the high mortality rates for infants and mothers. He urged that members take instruction under Belize Town Public Hospital matron Lois M. Roberts, an Englishwoman, in general hospital procedures and hygiene. As Roberts had been unable to secure sufficient nurses for her training program, she agreed to accept the Black Cross Nurses. By 1922, seventeen of the first training class of twenty nurses passed their exams and were awarded their nursing certificates. By 1923, there were twenty-four certified nurses, who were each assigned a territory in Belize Town to administer to the needs of the poor, as unpaid volunteers.

In the aftermath of the 1931 Belize hurricane, the Nurses helped in the Public Hospital and in relief camps. An annual event called the Baby Exhibition, was a competition to award healthy infants in various age categories and display proper parenting to the populace. It was a popular event which consolidated the public perception of the nurses as professionals, since they chose the contestants, and the approval of the government, since the colonial medical authorities determined the winners. They also conducted studies and research on the health of communities, as well as humanitarian projects like the 1934 Palace Unemployed Women's Fund, aimed at providing groceries to unemployed mothers.

Seay, and thus the organization, were staunchly in opposition to universal suffrage. On the one hand, they sought Victorian morality as a means to improve society as a whole and were rigidly opposed to the baser habits of the lower classes while on the other, they expanded women's spheres from within the confines of domesticity. For the first time, middle-class black women, who were trained as nurses, were publicly active and held positions of community leadership. The attempts to control others' morality were not always appreciated and Seay's political involvement and party politics became divisive points, which reflected on the nurses. In the attempt to maintain order, Seay's policies excluded poor and working-class women, while at the same time strengthening middle-class Creole political worth.

Though the organization never came under government control, by 1952 the Black Cross Nurses had influenced the health policies of seven of the colonial governors of British Honduras. It was the most active and lasting black organization in the country, and though it lost momentum after Seay's death was revitalized in the 1980s and continues to serve the humanitarian needs of communities in which its members live.

=== Caribbean ===
The Black Cross Nursing organizations of Cuba sprang up mostly in the areas which were highly influenced by British West Indians and in company towns like those that existed for the United Fruit Company. The organization in Banes, Cuba, was developed as an avenue to create acceptance and respectability for blacks, promoting pan-Africanism. The organization thrived until 1932 when the combination of economic depression and rising Cuban Nationalism turned toward labor militancy and communism.

The Black Cross Nursing organization of Jamaica was organized in 1922. Sarah Grant, who had trained students at Victoria Jubilee Hospital, trained 29 nurses, though their training remained rudimentary and the organization was always a volunteer auxiliary which did not develop into a strong organization.

=== Canada ===
In Canada, the Black Cross Nursing organized as a response to denial of black women's participation in World War I efforts to assist wounded soldiers. The women organized to provide medical help including child care services, first aid, health care, nutrition education and other services. Approximately 25% of the black population of Canada joined the Universal Negro Improvement Association of Canada and a high percentage of those members were of West Indian heritage, possibly due to the strong identification of people from the Caribbean with the British colour-class system: white rulers; brown, mixed-race middle class; and black, laboring lower class. However another important factor was the higher education level and political awareness of Caribbean-born immigrants compared with other black Canadians.

West Indians who immigrated as a whole were ambitious and wanted to improve their communities. The BCN organization served to reinforce these ideals, moving many black women away from traditional domestic work and labor and into universities, though not in Canada. The majority of Canadian higher education and hospital organizations refused training for black women, forcing them to look to traditional black colleges in the United States. The nurses were a vital part of providing health services to the black communities of Montreal, Ontario, Nova Scotia and other provinces. Throughout Canada, UNIA divisions were established in 32 cities and towns, but almost all had waned by the 1940s.

== Sources ==
- Appiah, Anthony; Gates, Henry Louis (2005). Africana: The Encyclopedia of the African and African American Experience. Oxford University Press. ISBN 978-0-19-517055-9.
- Duncan, Natanya (2009). The 'Efficient Womanhood' of the Universal Negro Improvement Association: 1919–1930 (PDF) (Ph.D.). Gainesville, Florida: University of Florida. Archived from the original (PDF) on 11 July 2021.
- Franklin, Donna (11 September 2001). What's Love Got to Do With It?: Understanding and Healing the Rift Between Black Men and Women. Simon and Schuster. ISBN 978-0-7432-0321-0.
- Garvey, Marcus (17 August 1987). Marcus Garvey Life and Lessons: A Centennial Companion to the Marcus Garvey and Universal Negro Improvement Association Papers. University of California Press. ISBN 978-0-520-90871-0.
- Hammett, Jerilou; Hammett, Kingsley (20 March 2012). The Suburbanization of New York: Is the World's Greatest City Becoming Just Another Town?. Chronicle Books. ISBN 978-1-61689-069-8.
- Haskins, Jim; Tate, Eleanora E.; Cox, Clinton; Wilkinson, Brenda (17 February 2003). Black Stars of the Harlem Renaissance. John Wiley & Sons. ISBN 978-0-471-46263-7.
- Keller, Rosemary Skinner; Ruether, Rosemary Radford; Cantlon, Marie (2006). Encyclopedia of Women and Religion in North America: Women in North American Catholicism. Bloomington, Indiana: Indiana University Press. ISBN 0-253-34688-6.
- Macpherson, Anne S. (November 2003). "Colonial Matriarchs: Garveyism, Maternalism, and Belize's Black Cross Nurses, 1920–1952". Gender & History. 15 (3). Hoboken, New Jersey: Wiley-Blackwell: 507–527. doi:10.1111/j.0953-5233.2003.00318.x. ISSN 0953-5233. S2CID 144192762.
- Macpherson, Anne S. (2007). From Colony to Nation: Women Activists and the Gendering of Politics in Belize, 1912–1982 (PDF). Lincoln, Nebraska: University of Nebraska Press. ISBN 978-0-8032-0626-7. Archived from the original (PDF) on 2016-02-22.
- Marano, Carla (June 2010). "′Rising Strongly and Rapidly′: The Universal Negro Improvement Association in Canada, 1919–1940". The Canadian Historical Review. 91 (2). Toronto, Canada: University of Toronto Press: 233–259. doi:10.1353/can.0.0309. ISSN 0008-3755.
- Martin, Tony (1984). The Pan-African Connection: From Slavery to Garvey and Beyond. Wellesley, Massachusetts: The Majority Press. ISBN 978-0-912469-11-9.
- Mathieu, Sarah-Jane (2010). North of the Color Line: Migration and Black Resistance in Canada, 1870–1955. Chapel Hill, North Carolina: University of North Carolina Press. ISBN 978-0-8078-9939-7.
- Sullivan, Frances Peace (2014). "'Forging Ahead' in Banes, Cuba: Garveyism in a United Fruit Company Town". New West Indian Guide. 88 (3–4). Leiden, Netherlands: Brill Publishers: 231–261. doi:10.1163/22134360-08803061. ISSN 1382-2373.
- Summers, Martin (15 December 2005). Manliness and Its Discontents: The Black Middle Class and the Transformation of Masculinity, 1900–1930. University of North Carolina Press. ISBN 978-0-8078-6417-3.
- Taylor, Quintard; Moore, Shirley Ann Wilson (2003). African American Women Confront the West: 1600–2000. University of Oklahoma Press. ISBN 978-0-8061-3524-3.
- Wiggins, William H. Jr. (1990). O Freedom!: Afro-American Emancipation Celebrations. Univ. of Tennessee Press. ISBN 978-0-87049-665-3.
- Williams, Cynthia; Buckley, De Ann, eds. (2013). "Emmeline Elizabeth Baptist" (PDF). Women's Month 2013: "The Gender Agenda: Gaining Momentum". Belize City, Belize: Belize Women's Department.
