= Sambai =

Creole dance

- Genre: Fertility dance
- Origin: Belize

Christmas Bram and Sambai of Gales Point Manatee, Belize
- UNESCO Intangible Cultural Heritage
- Country: Belize
- Reference: 00258
- Region: Latin America and the Caribbean

Inscription history
- Inscription: 2025 (20th session)
- List: Representative

The sambai is a Creole fertility dance performed in Belize during the full moon, and during weddings or birthdays. It is a solitary dance that was originally performed by men but can now be performed by either gender. The dancer enters a ring of drummers to dance, and when finished points to another person who dances next.
