= Declaration of the Rights of the Negro Peoples of the World =

- Adopted: 1920
- Location: Harlem, New York, United States
- Organization: Universal Negro Improvement Association
- Authors: Marcus Garvey, convention delegates
- Full Text: https://www.balanta.org/history/international-day-for-people-of-african-descent-unia-declaration

The Declaration of the Rights of the Negro Peoples of the World is a document drafted at the inaugural convention of the Universal Negro Improvement Association (UNIA) in New York by convention delegates in 1920, which protests the discrimination faced by Black people and demands fundamental rights and fair treatment for Black people everywhere. The landmark document is one of the earliest compilations of social, civil, and political rights. The Declaration consists of a preamble and 54 articles. Marcus Garvey, the founder of the UNIA, presided over the convention as chairman and oversaw the creation of the Declaration.

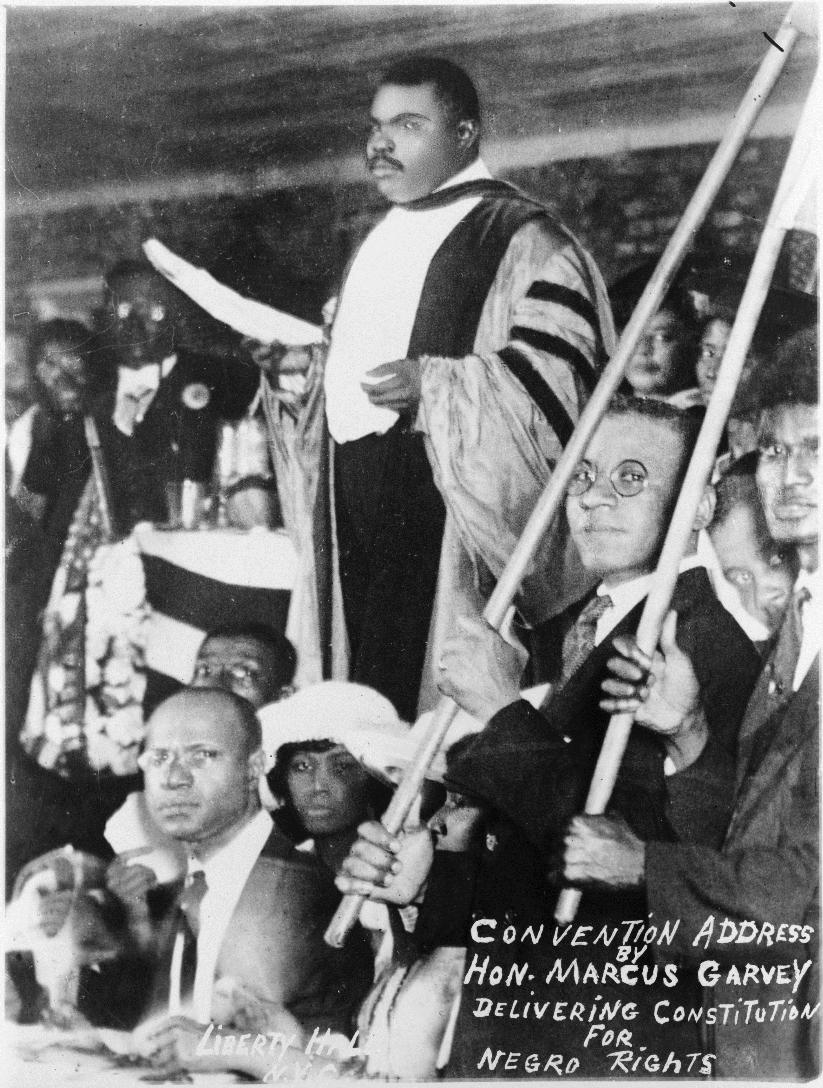
Marcus Garvey delivering his inaugural address to the 1920 UNIA convention at Liberty Hall.

== History ==
UNIA founder Marcus Garvey brought thousands of delegates from across the world to Harlem, New York, with three objectives in mind: discussing the challenges facing Black people, planning for the resettlement of Africa, and framing a bill of rights. The convention took place at Liberty Hall, where the UNIA held their weekly meetings. On the first day of the convention, Garvey addressed a crowd of more than 10,000, saying, "This convention of the UNIA is called for the purpose of framing a Bill of Rights for the Negro Race. We shall write a constitution within this month of August that shall guide and govern the destiny of four hundred million Negroes of the world".

Garvey thought of the convention participants as delegates, representing Black people from all over the U.S., Africa, South America, and the West Indies. The delegates delivered speeches about their communities during the first week of the convention, which were meant to contextualize the crafting of the Declaration, grounding the document in lived experiences. The second week was devoted to drafting the Declaration. Garvey had prepared his own version of the Declaration and presented it on the floor. He insisted that each delegate present their own resolutions to be written up as amendments and extensions to his initial document. Garvey had veto power and ruled resolutions he disagreed with "out of order".

The Declaration was completed and signed by 122 delegates on August 13, with Marcus Garvey as the first undersigned. On August 15, Garvey read out the full Declaration of Rights to the convention, met with cheering and applause from the audience. The Declaration was called the "Magna Carta of the Negroes of the world" and "the most sacred document any body of colored people had ever drafted" by a reporter for the Negro World, the UNIA's newspaper. In an August 17 editorial for the Negro World, Garvey wrote of the completion of the Declaration and celebrated its assertion that Black people were entitled to the same rights and privileges which were enjoyed by all mankind. In the same piece, Garvey argued that the delegates had promulgated a "clear and convincing Declaration", which embodied the spirit of the dedication of Black people to actualize the rights codified in the new Declaration.

Garvey believed that the Declaration was the rightful property of all Black people worldwide, and that every Black person should own a copy. The delegates set out to publish the Declaration so that it could be widely distributed and shared in the press. The officials elected to lead the UNIA during the convention, including President General Garvey, vowed to uphold the Declaration when they were sworn into office. In an August 24 article for the Negro World, Garvey penned that the Declaration would go down in history as a foundational document of freedom and human rights, alongside the Magna Carta and the Declaration of Independence.

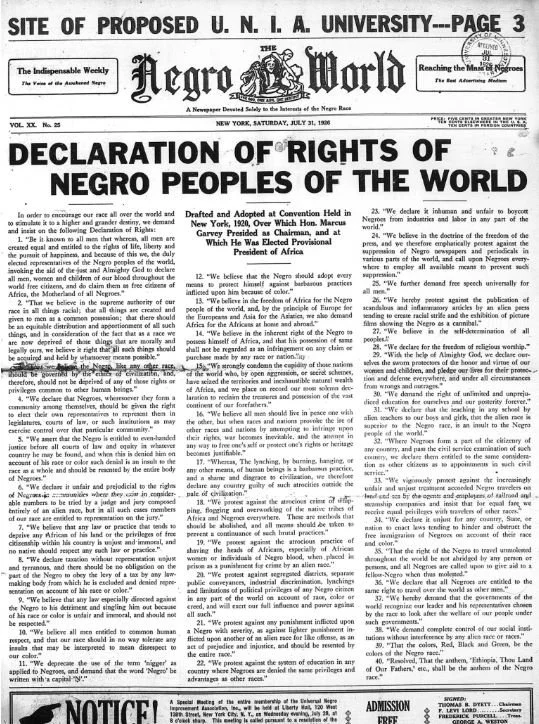
The Declaration of Rights of Negro Peoples of the World, printed in the August 31, 1920 edition of the Negro World.

== Structure and Content ==
=== Preamble ===
The beginning of the Declaration reads: "Be It Resolved, That the Negro people of the world, through their chosen representatives in convention assembled in Liberty Hall... protest against the wrongs and injustices they are suffering at the hands of their white brethren, and state what they deem their fair and just rights, as well as the treatment they propose to demand of all men in the future".

The Declaration created the official flag of the Negro people. The flag was adopted as the Pan-African flag.

The first line aptly summarizes the content of the Declaration. The Declaration is split into a list of objections to the discrimination endured by Black people living under white supremacy and the articles containing the rights demanded by the delegates. Following the opening line, the Declaration lists 11 complaints that call out abuse and racial inequality. The complaints include the lack of equal treatment between Black and white men, employment discrimination and pay inequality, the relegation of Black people to separate but inferior resources and facilities, and the excessive violence perpetrated by white people against Black people, with a specific protest against the lynching of Black people in the American South. The complaints also call out the colonization of Africa, disenfranchisement, taxation without representation, and unfair treatment in the courts. The complaints condemn the "inhuman, un-Christian, and uncivilized treatment" of Black people under global white supremacy.

The preamble concludes by outlining the purpose of the Declaration, which is to encourage the Black race to overcome the challenges it faces and reach a "higher and grander destiny".

=== Articles ===
The 54 articles cover a range of issues, from the colonization of Africa to racial violence. The articles assert that Black people are entitled to equal rights, denounce discrimination, and lay the groundwork for an independent Black state, which was the UNIA's goal.

=== Articles ===	Summary
1	References the Declaration of Independence and declares that all Negroes are free citizens, entitled to "life, liberty, and the pursuit of happiness".
2-9, 41	Demand that Black people have equal rights under the law, including the right to elect representatives and have a fair trial.
10, 11, 26	Object to the disrespect and defamation endured by Black people.
12, 16	Assert that Black people have the right to defend themselves, and justifies the use of violence against oppression.
13, 14, 15	Declare that the Black diaspora has a claim on Africa and demand the return of African land to Africans and the diaspora.
17, 18, 19	Condemn acts of racial violence, including lynching.
20-23, 32, 42	Protest against various forms of racial discrimination, including segregated schools, hospitals, and workplaces.
24, 25, 27, 28, 50, 51	Detail the specific freedoms Black people are entitled to, including freedom of speech, religion, and commerce.
29	Pledges to protect women and children.
30, 31, 49	Declare the right of Black children to an education that includes Black history.
33-36	Demand that Black people gain the privilege to travel within nation-states and around the world.
37-40, 43, 52, 53	Outline the foundations of a new Black nation, including the official red, black, and green flag and national anthem of the Negro race, and demand the recognition of Marcus Garvey and the UNIA representatives as the leaders of all Black people.
44, 45, 46, 52	Universalize the Declaration by extending the rights to all people and denounce the League of Nations as invalid for Black people.
47, 48	Discourage Black men from serving in the armies of imperial powers.
54	Concludes by vowing to strive for the freedom and equality of the Black race.

== Significance for Human Rights ==
The Declaration of the Rights of the Negro Peoples of the world is typically overlooked in the study of human rights. Professor Laura Madokoro argues that the Declaration should be considered a crucial part of human rights history, along with seminal works like Rights of Man and the Universal Declaration of Human Rights. The UNIA Declaration predates the United Nations' Declaration and is one of the first documents to insist on universal human rights by extending civil, political, and social rights to Black people.
