= Venus Theatre =

American regional theater in Laurel, Maryland, US

Coordinates: 39°6′21″N 76°50′43.5″W

Venus Theatre is the longest-running regional theater producing only plays written by women. The theatre was founded as a nonprofit in Laurel by Deborah Randall in 2001.

Deborah Randall is the founding Artistic Director. The musical director is Alan Scott. Venus Theatre was an outgrowth of Venus Envy, an all-female improv troupe and outreach company. Venus Envy was an outgrowth of the SHE Co in DC. Venus Envy did community outreach with other organizations such as: Code Pink, The House of Ruth, Take Back the Night, and Break the Chain. Venus Theatre has primarily produced works by and about women.

Awards: Helen Hayes/American Express Award for Artistic directors. Past productions have won the Maryland Theatrical Association's Best Drama Prize in 2002 and 2005.

Venus Theatre moved out of its space of 15 years in Laurel, MD in February of 2022. The Covid epidemic along with a nearly 30% rental increase were the determining factors.

Production history includes:

2019 COLLABORATIVE ITERATIONS- Jane app by Deborah Randall, #solestories by Renee Calarco, The Finger by Doruntina Basha, The Powers that BE by Deborah Randall and Alan Scott; 2018 This Little Light by Jennifer Faletto, The Speed Twins by Maureen Chadwick, Living and Dying with Tricia McCauley by Deborah Randall, Running On Glass by Cynthia Cooper; 2017 SELECTIONS FROM: the Methuen Drama Book of Suffrage Plays edited by Naomi Cruz, Tunnel Vision by Andrea Lepcio, Aglaonike’s Tiger by Claudia Barnett, The Ravens by Alana Valentine; 2016 FUR by Migdalia Cruz, Garbage Kids by Jayme Kilburn, Rock the Line by Kathleen Warnock, Soft Revolution: Shafana and Aunt Sarrinah by Alana Valentine, 2015 GOD DON' LIKE UGLY by Doc Andersen-Bloomfield, dry bones rising by Cecelia Raker, Witches Vanish by Claudia Barnett, RAW by Amy Bernstein; 2014 Virus Attacks Heart by Shannon Murdoch, We Are Samurai by Daria Marinelli, Light of Night by Cecilia Copeland, Ding!. or bye bye dad by Jayme Kilburn; 2013 No. 731 Degraw-Street, Brooklyn or Emily Dickinson's Sister by Claudia Barnett, Gift of Forgotten Tongues by Fengar Gael, Grieving for Genevieve by Kathleen Warnock, Following Sarah by Rich Espey; 2012 A Girl Named Destiny by Rand Higbee, Punk Rock Mom by Alyson Mead, Devil Dog Six by Fengar Gael, Claudie Hukill by Sean O'Leary; 2011 The Last Reading of Charlotte Cushman written by Carolyn Gage | directed by Karen Shields, Hypnotic Murderess written by Steven Levingston, Lou by John Carter, The Stenographer by Zoe Mavroudi; 2010 Looking for the Pony written by Andrea Lepcio | directed by Catherine Tripp, Play Nice! written by Robin Rice Lichtig | directed by Lee Mikeska Gardner, In the Goldfish Bowl written by Kay Rhodes, Zelda at the Oasis written by P.H. Lin | directed by Lynn Sharp Spears; 2009 not such stuff by Chris Wind, Homokay's Medea by Julianne Homokay, Why'd Ya Make Me Wear This Joe? by Vanda, Helen of Sparta by Jacob M. Appel; 2008 wRighting Women Reading Series: Baby Dykes, Straight Chicks, and Actresses/Ordinary Mourning/Oh...God...Yes! by Linda Suzuki, wRighting Women Reading Series: JUVENILLA by Reina Hardy, wRighting Women Reading Series: Breaking the Bell JaR plays on poems by sylvia plath by Julianne Homokay, All female Measure for Measure by William Shakespeare, wRighting Women Reading Series: Tophet Point by Chris Shawn Swanson, wRighiting Women Reading Series: THE AMAZING YAMASHITA AND THE GOLDDIGGERS OF 2009 by Carolyn Gage, THE PARMACHENE BELLE CALAMITY JANE SENDS A MESSAGE TO HER DAUGHTER AND OTHER SOLO SHORTS written by Carolyn Gage | directed by Carolyn Gage. LYSISTRATION: A FEMINIST ROCK OPERA by Deborah Randall (DC Fringe Festival), wRighting Women Reading Series: ON THIN ICE by Lisa Bonita Bridgens, wRighting Women Reading Series: Three Sisters From Queens by Claudia Haas, wRighting Women Reading Series: A SLICE OF HER LIFE by Gina Stewart | directed by Carolyn Gage; 2007 Heartfriends Musical for Children: Boogsnot and the Disco Dancing Meltdown of the Snows by Deborah Randall and Alan Scott, Heartfriends Musical for Children: Fiona the Fish and the Magical Carwash, by Deborah Randall and Alan Scott, Heartfriends Musical for Children: Juanita the Walrus Goes on a Shopping Spree (reprise) by Deborah Randall and Alan Scott; 2006 Are You A Daughter of Molly Maguire? by Deborah Randall, How She Played the Game by Cynthia Cooper | directed by Benjamin Pohlmeier, Heartfriends Musical for Children; Juanita the Walrus Goes on a Shopping Spree by Deborah Randall and Alan Scott; 2005 Cigarettes and Moby Dick by Migdalia Cruz, A Little Rebellion Now by Lisa Voss; 2004 Ugly Ducklings by Carolyn Gage, Bad girls III Summer Play Festival: The Redemption written by Dale Spender, Charisse Montgomery, Jeni Bindeman, Jae Kramison, Linda Suzuki, Deborah Randall, Jenny Klion, and J. Montegue; 2003 Bad Girls II Summer Play Festival; 2002 Bad Girls Summer Play Festival, CodePink Outdoor Play Readings: Rules of the Playground by Carolyn Gage, A Chat With Miss Chicky by Dale Spender; 2000 Daughters of Molly Maguire by Deborah Randall; 1999 Til It Hurts Solo Tour by Deborah Randall; 1998 The Voice Inside the Vessel, three woman tour by Deborah Randall

Recent productions include Shakespeare's Measure for Measure and On Thin Ice. The theater's annual "retro-classic" new works series for 2009 featured Chris Wind's Not Such Stuff, Julia Homokay's Homokay's Medea, Vanda's Why'd Ya Make Me Wear This, Joe, and Jacob M. Appel's Helen of Sparta.
