= Manatee River (Belize) =

Coordinates: 17.227°N 88.314°W

Location
- Country: Belize

Physical characteristics
- Mouth
  - location: Caribbean Sea
  - elevation: 0 m (0 ft)

Manatee River is a coastal watercourse in the Belize District of Belize. It consists of two parts, one on the western side of the Southern Lagoon, and the other connecting the eastern side of the Southern Lagoon with the Caribbean Sea (sometimes called the Manatee Bar River). The beach on either side of the mouth of the river is a nesting site for loggerhead and Hawksbill sea turtles. The river was originally known by the Maya as the Texach.
