= Shade =

Shade, shades or shading most often refer to:

- Shade (color), a mixture of a color with black (often generalized as any variety of a color)
- Shade (shadow), the blocking of sunlight
- Shades or sunglasses
- Shading, a process used in art and graphic design
- Shade (mythology), the spirit or ghost of a dead person

Shade, shades or shading may also refer to:

== Arts and media ==
=== Fictional characters and elements ===
- Shade (character), an ambiguous villain in the DC universe
- Shade (Dungeons & Dragons), creatures in Dungeons & Dragons
- Shade (Ninjago), a character in Ninjago
- Shade (Silverwing character), a character in Kenneth Oppel's Silverwing series
- Shade (Sonic the Hedgehog), a character in Sonic Chronicles
- Shade, the Changing Man, a character in the Vertigo Comics imprint
- Shade, a character in Beyond Oasis
- Shade, a playable character in Brawl Stars
- Shade, a character in the Mana series
- Shade, a creature from The Inheritance Cycle by Christopher Paolini
- Shades (comics), the name of a supervillain in Marvel Comics
- Hazel Shade, a character from Pale Fire
- John Shade, a character from Pale Fire
- The Shades, a part of the twin-city Ankh-Morpork from the Discworld novels

=== Books ===
- Shade (novel), by Neil Jordan
- Shades (novel), a 1993 book by Marguerite Poland
- Shades series, a book series by Rob Hood
- "Shades" (story), an 1885 short story by Bolesław Prus
- Shade, the Changing Man (Vertigo), an American superhero comic book featuring the character of the same name

=== Film and television ===
- Shade (film), a 2003 crime film by Damian Nieman
- Shades (film), a 1999 film by Erik Van Looy
- The Shade (film), a 1999 film by Raphael Nadjari
- Shades (TV series), a British television series
- Shade, a 2006 film starring Patrick Dempsey
- "Shade" (The Flash), an episode of The Flash

=== Music ===
==== Albums ====
- Shades (J. J. Cale album) (1981), the sixth album by J. J. Cale, released in 1981
- Shade (Holly Cole album) (2003), a studio album by Holly Cole
- Shades 1968–1998, a Deep Purple compilation album
- Shade (Murray Head album) (1983), the fifth studio album by Murray Head
- Shades (Andrew Hill album) (1988), an album by American jazz pianist Andrew Hill, recorded in 1986
- Shades (Keith Jarrett album) (1975), the fifth album on Impulse by jazz pianist Keith Jarrett
- Shade, disc two of Mike Oldfield's Light + Shade album
- Shades (Shades album), the only studio album by American R&B group Shades
- Shades (Yellowjackets album) (1986), the fourth studio album from the jazz group Yellowjackets
- Shade (Living Colour album), the sixth studio album by Living Colour

==== Songs ====
- "Shades" (1985 song), a 1985 song accompanying commercials for Crown Paints
- "Shade" (Silverchair song) (1995), a song by Australian alternative rock band Silverchair
- "Shade", a 2007 song by The Tossers from Agony
- "Shade", a 2011 song by Nadia Oh from Colours
- "Shade", a 2024 song by Yeat from 2093
- "Shades", a 1987 song by Iggy Pop from Blah-Blah-Blah
- "Shades" (Alexandra Savior song), the debut single by American singer-songwriter Alexandra Savior
- "The Shade", a 2015 song by Metric from Pagans in Vegas
- "Shading", a song by All That Remains from the 2002 album Behind Silence and Solitude

==== Performers ====
- Shades (band), an American R&B group
- Shaed, an American indie pop trio

=== Video games ===
- Shade (video game), a 2000 game by Andrew Plotkin
- Shade: Wrath of Angels, a 2004 Computer and Xbox game developed by Black Element Software
- SHADES, a multi-user dungeon game that existed in the 1980s

=== Other uses in arts and media ===
- Shade (color), a mixture of a color with black (often generalized as any variety of a color)
- Shading, a process used in art and graphic design
- The Shade (sculpture) and The Three Shades, sculptures by Auguste Rodin

== People ==
=== Surname ===
- Absalom Shade (died 1862), Canadian businessman
- Ashlynn Shade, (born 2004), American basketball player
- Will Shade (1898–1966), American musician
- Dave Shade (1902–1983), American boxer
- Ellen Shade (born 1944), American operatic soprano from New York
- Eric Shade (cricketer) (born 1943), Australian cricketer
- Eric Shade (footballer) (1912–1984), Australian rules footballer
- Hastings Shade (1941–2010), former deputy chief of the Cherokee Nation
- J. Norman Shade (1902–1985), American politician and businessman
- Mariah Shade (born 1991), Trinidadian soccer forward
- Nancy Shade (born 1949), soprano, singing-actress
- Ronnie Shade (1938–1986), Scottish professional golfer
- Sam Shade (born 1973), American assistant special teams coach and former football safety
- Rocky Shades (born 1960), English singer

=== Given name or nickname ===
- Shade (rapper) (born 1987), Italian rapper, singer and voice actor
- Shade Munro (born 1966), Scottish rugby union player
- Shade Pratt (born 1993), American soccer player
- Shade Rupe (born 1968), American writer, editor, and filmmaker
- Shade Sheist (born 1979), American songwriter and recording artist

== Places ==
- Shade, Kentucky, US
- Shade, Missouri, US
- Shade, Ohio, US
- Shade Gap, Pennsylvania, US
- Shade Township, Pennsylvania, US
- Shade Creek, US
- Shades Mountain, US

== Other uses ==
- Shade (shadow), the blocking of sunlight
- Shades or sunglasses
- Shade (mythology), the spirit or ghost of a dead person
- "Throw shade", slang term for an insulting remark
- Price shading, variable pricing of a product to different consumers
- Shade number, a rating of the protection offered by welding helmets
- WindowShade, a control panel in Mac OS 7.5
- Window shade, a type of window covering

== See also ==
- Shadow (disambiguation)
- Sunshade (disambiguation)
- Shady (disambiguation)
