= Eric Shade =

Eric Shade can refer to:

- Eric Shade (cricketer) (born 1943), Australian cricketer
- Eric Shade (footballer) (1912–1984), Australian rules footballer
