= SS Yarmouth =

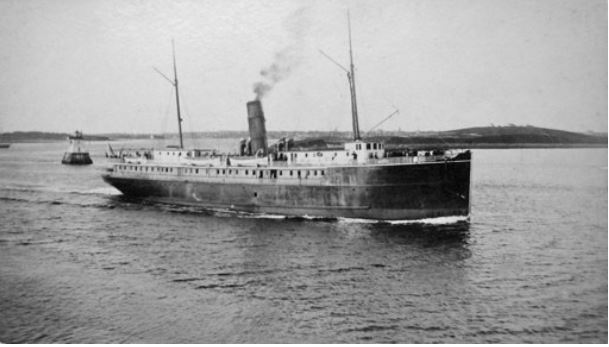
- SS Yarmouth

History

Canada
- Name: Yarmouth
- Owner: Yarmouth Steamship Company, of Yarmouth, Nova Scotia.
- Port of registry: Glasgow, Scotland
- Builder: Archibald McMillan & Son, of Dumbarton, Scotland
- Yard number: 276
- Way number: 93373
- Launched: 28 February 1887
- Maiden voyage: April 1887
- In service: 7 May 1887
- Out of service: 1922

Canada
- Owner: North American SS Corp.Ltd. (Yarmouth Steamship Company), Yarmouth Nova Scotia
- Operator: Black Star Line of Canada Ltd
- Fate: Broken up 1922 at Philadelphia by Pottsdown Steel Co.

General characteristics
- Type: passenger / cargo
- Tonnage: 1432 grt, 746 nrt
- Length: 220.3 ft
- Beam: 35.2ft
- Draft: 12.7 ft
- Depth: 13.3 ft
- Installed power: steam. T3Cy26"41" & 65 x 42" 260nhp, 1 screw, D. Rowan & Son, Glasgow
- Propulsion: steel screw steamer – coaster
- Speed: 14 knots

SS Yarmouth was a steamship notable for its part in developing Yarmouth, Nova Scotia, and connecting it to Boston, Massachusetts. Later in life it had a central role as the flagship of the Marcus Garvey initiative the Black Star Line. Marcus Garvey, known as the "Black Moses", was a "back to Africa" evangelist, and his ideas, although radical and controversial in his own time and today, still remain influential. The Black Star Line's name, a play on the White Star Line, is remembered in the flag of Ghana.

== Construction ==
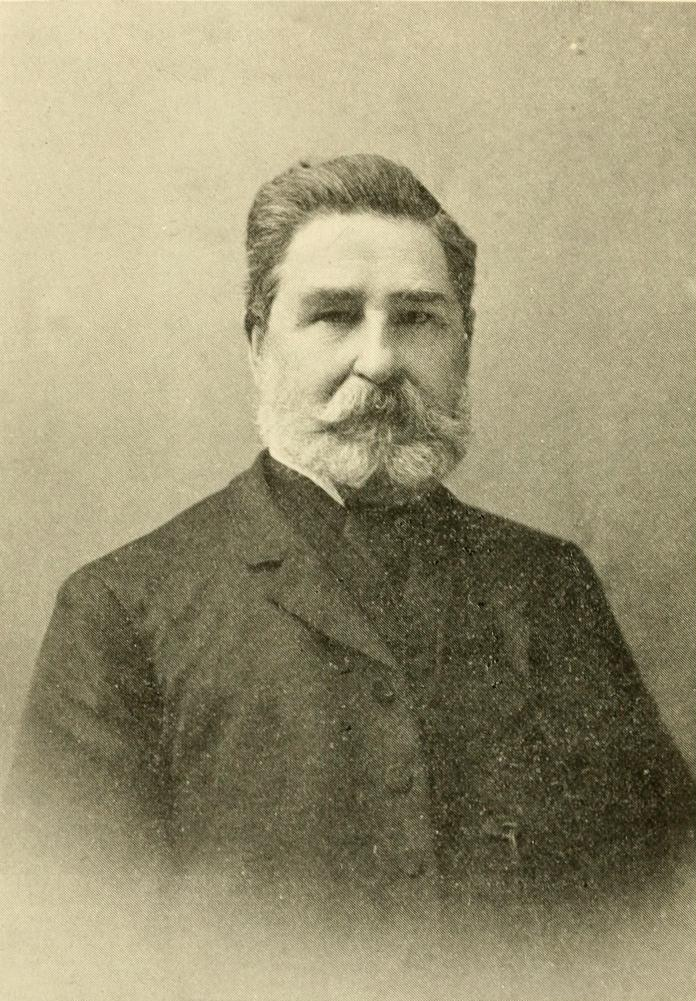
Captain Harvey Doane

Built by the Clyde shipbuilder Archibald McMillan & Son, of Dumbarton, Scotland, for the Yarmouth Steamship Company, of Yarmouth, Nova Scotia, Yarmouth was designed to ferry both passengers and goods. She was a steel screw steamer, 220 feet (67 m) long p/p, with a 35-foot (11 m) beam and hold depth of 21.5 feet (6.6 m). She had five watertight compartments and could carry 4,000 barrels. She was fitted with bilge keels and was capable of 14 knots.

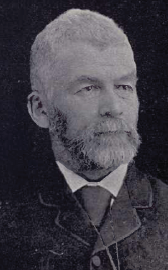
L. E. Baker

The ship's bell was cast at the foundry of J. M. Broomall, and due to its shape and design it has been speculated that it originated from the Philadelphia area. When launched on 28 February 1887, Yarmouth was designed to be the finest steamship on the route between Eastern Canada and the United States. She was first registered in Glasgow by the shipbuilder and took just 9 1/2 days to sail the Atlantic on her maiden voyage. On 3 May in 1887, she arrived in Yarmouth and under the command of Captain Harvey Doane and Pilot S. F. Stanwood, she made her first trip to Boston a few days later on 7 May.

She would remain in service on the Yarmouth – Boston route till 1911.

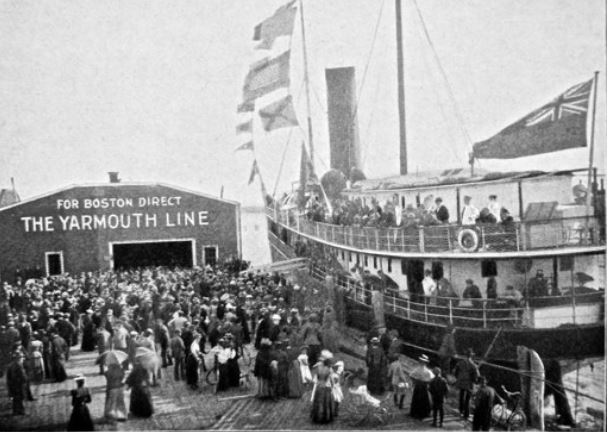
Yarmouth moored at Baker's wharf, Yarmouth

=== Yarmouth Steamship Company ===
In 1885, L.E. Baker wished to expand on his existing railroad, import and mercantile businesses in Nova Scotia. He had seen the need for reliable transportation links between Yarmouth, and ports on the Bay of Fundy, and from Yarmouth to Boston. Baker foresaw that the shipping company would bring in tourists to the province, and open up opportunities for building hotels, rail connections, and the development of "ports of call" along its route. His first step in November 1884, was when he and Captain Harvey Doane bought the SS City of Saint John. Soon after, he established the Yarmouth Line in May 1885, with the purchase from the Nova Scotia Steamship Company of Clements Wharf and the SS Dominion of 450 tons. The Dominion had started life as the SS Linda, built in 1884 by Hill & Grinnell at Mystic Bridge. Together both these ships operated regular services on the key routes for transportation and commerce in the region; Yarmouth and Boston, Halifax and St. John. In January 1886 Baker acquired the SS Alpha, and with the Dominion, the line was able to offer passenger and freight services from Yarmouth to Halifax, Boston, and Saint John. In February 1887, to raise further capital, Baker reorganized the company as the Boston & Yarmouth Steamship Company, thus enabling funding for the purchase of the SS Yarmouth for the Boston service, which began operating in May 1887. Business was good and they expanded services again with the SS Boston in September 1890. In 1894 the company was absorbed along with Baker's other business, the Western Counties Railway Company, into the Dominion Atlantic Railway. Baker died in 1899.

=== Stranding ===
In Ottawa, on 1 April 1908, the findings of the "Wreck Commissioner of Canada" O. G. V. Spain were presented to the Deputy Minister, Marine and Fisheries in Ottawa concerning an incident in 1907/1908 when the Yarmouth was stranded under the command of Captain McKinnon. The Commissioner criticised the Captain for underestimating the tide and a lack of precaution.

In 1911 the Canadian Pacific Railway (CPR) took over the Dominion Atlantic Railway (DAR) company, with the DAR continuing as a trading name. The DAR sold three vessels and all rights to the Boston service to the Boston & Yarmouth Steamship Company division of Eastern Steamship., and so the CPR (DAR) reassigned the Yarmouth to the Digby – Saint John, New Brunswick route.

== First World War ==
In 1916, the CPR replaced her on the Digby – Saint John, New Brunswick route with the SS Empress, and sold her to the North American Steamship Company (NASC). From then on, the Yarmouth hauled coal between Nova Scotia and Boston. NASC was owned by a cotton broker, W. L. Harriss, who bought the Yarmouth for $350,000 and made back his investment by using her several times on trans-Atlantic convoy routes. He was more than keen to offload her onto an amenable buyer.

== The Black Star Line ==
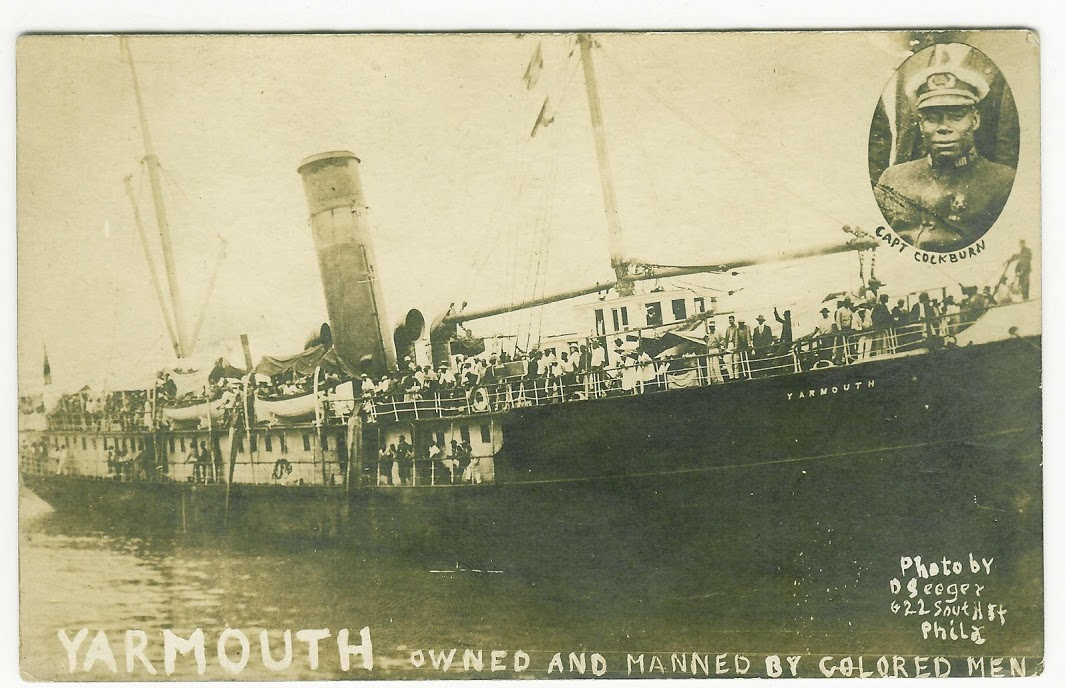
SS Yarmouth, and Captain Cockburn c.1920

On 17 September 1919, the Yarmouth was bought by the Black Star Line (BSL), which had been incorporated in June 1919, from the North American Steamship Company, a subsidiary of Harriss, Magill, & Company. The BSL had been founded by Marcus Garvey, a proponent of Black nationalism who had several goals, one being the recolonization of Africa by black Americans and Jamaicans, preferably by establishing a black-nation state. As a part of this effort, he established the Black Star Line with funding from a stock issue, at $5 a share from members of his United Negro Improvement Association (UNIA). The name of the Black Star Line was a play on the White Star Line, the owner of the Titanic.

Garvey was determined to employ an all-black crew for the venture. A suitably qualified black skipper–a rare man in those days–presented himself, and Garvey offered him the job. The ship's new master was Captain Joshua Cockburn, a British Licensed master mariner born in Nassau in the Bahamas. Cockburn had initially trained with the Royal Navy as a lighthouse tender, then worked for the UK-based Elder Dempster Lines from 1908 to 1918, which had given him significant experience with freighters plying routes between British and West African ports, especially Nigeria. Garvey claimed Cockburn was the first colored man to command a deep-sea vessel. Cockburn was retained on a "princely" $400 a month, was adept at self promotion, and had Garvey's complete trust. One of Cockburn's first tasks was to source a suitable vessel, and broker the deal.

The BSL and other Garvey projects had already been infiltrated by agents of J. Edgar Hoover's Bureau of Investigation, one of whom was Dr Arthur Ullysses Craig. Cockburn took Craig with him to the inspect the Yarmouth. Craig was the first black electrical engineer in the US and as qualified as any for the task.

The ship was in need of extensive and drastic repairs. Her boiler crowns required renovation and her hull was almost worn out. Nevertheless, despite the contrary advice of Craig, Cockburn considered her seaworthy. Soon thereafter the BSL had to find $5,000 to repair the boiler before the maiden voyage.

Harriss, as has been said, was more than keen to find a buyer, and Cockburn and friends were all on commission. The seller had therefore good reason to ignore the BSL's inexperience and shaky financial credentials, which had aborted previous purchasing attempts by Garvey and his followers.

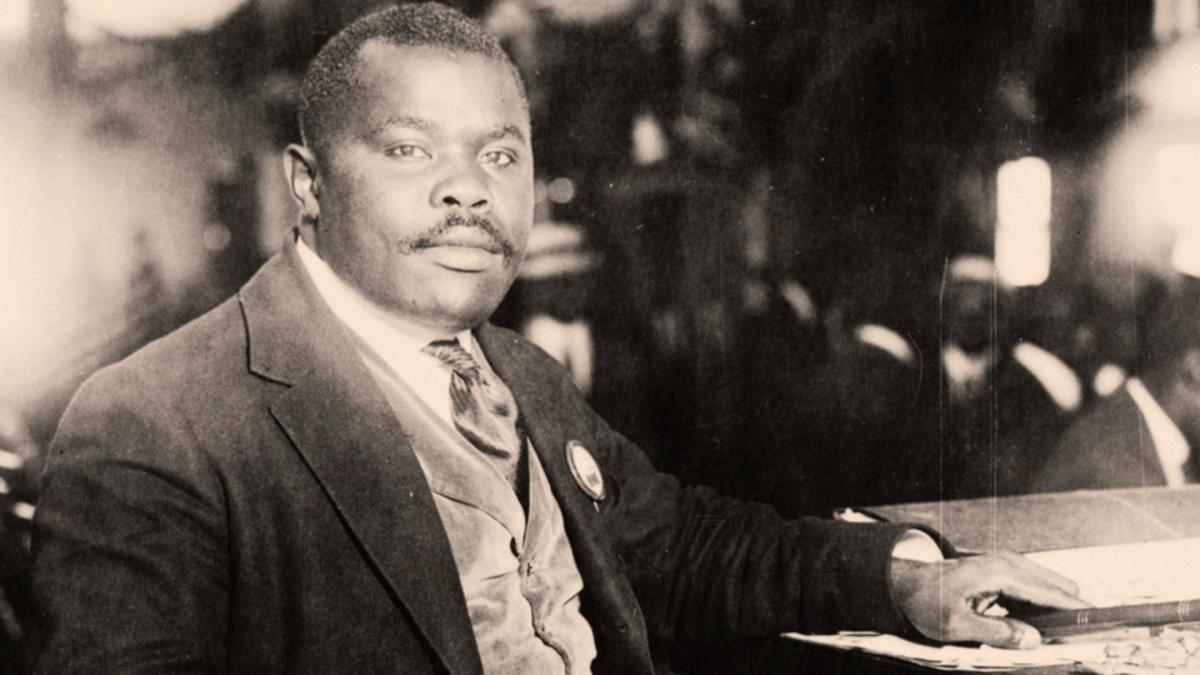
Marcus Garvey

To get round the BSL's fiscal shortcomings, the Yarmouth was in effect leased by Black Star Incorporated. She was to be paid for in 10 monthly instalments, totaling $165,000, before transfer of ownership. Like many financial details concerning this organization, sums vary; some sources put it at $168,500. The Black Star could not raise the full 10 percent deposit, and the agreement was altered to an ongoing lease of $2,000 per month.

The founding of the line and all its activities were political statements. The Negro World, a paper founded by Garvey, made a great play out of William Monroe Trotter having sailed on the Yarmouth as a waiter and cook on his way to the Paris Peace Conference. However, an indignity was forced upon him as he could not get a passport from the U.S. government for the trip. In fact, Trotter did go to Paris as a cook but he did so on the French vessel L'Ancore; this was confirmed by Trotter himself in the Boston Post of 24 July 1919, and repeated in the Baltimore Afro-American of 8 August 1919.

The Yarmouth was unofficially rechristened as the Frederick Douglass, the intention being to change her registration papers. This, however, was not completed, and she remained registered as the Yarmouth. Despite claims being made by the Black Star that they were the owners, this was not the case. In fact, she was on lease prior to completion of the terms of sale from the North American Shipping Corporation, so no official renaming could take place. As the financial obligations of the deal were never completed, the ship was to sail for her complete history (and tenure under the Black Star) with British registration and under the Union Jack and Maple Leaf flag. Her maiden voyage for the line to the West Indies and Central America was on 24 November 1919. Aside from a Scottish engineer, her crew was largely black British in origin.

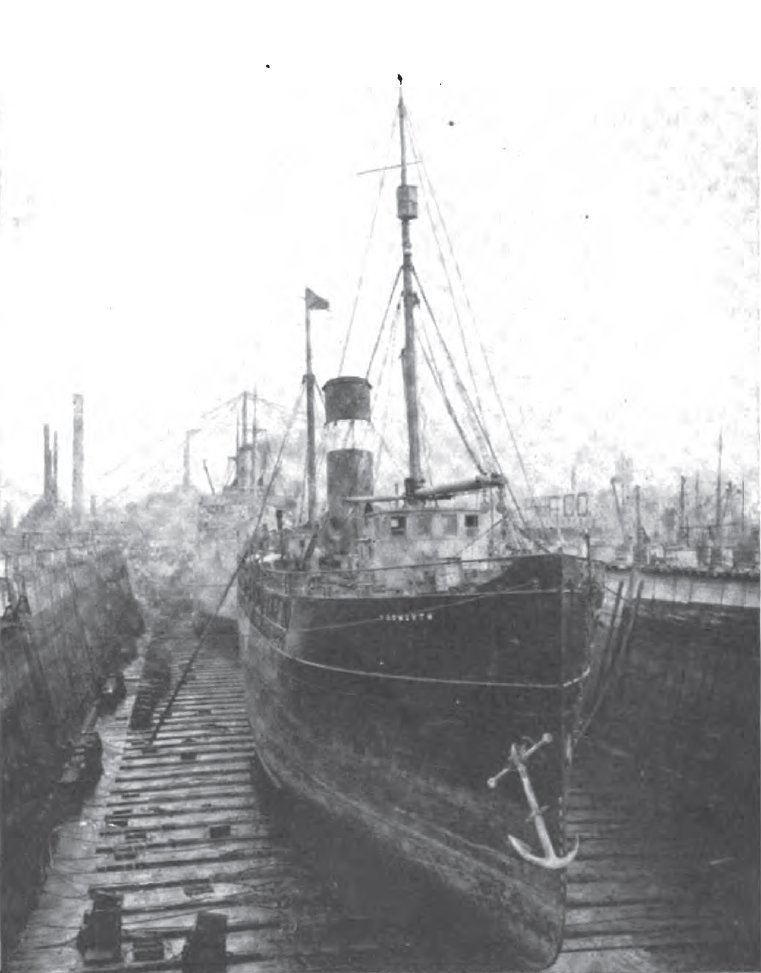
In for repair at the Morse dry dock in Brooklyn, 1920

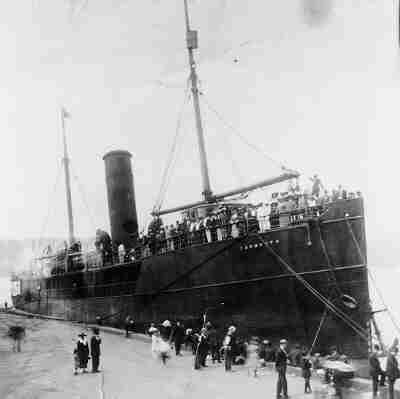
Black Star Liner

Her first voyage for the new line was a short one. On 31 October 1919, she left the 135th Street dock near Garvey's office to a "glorious" send-off from several thousand well-wishers, and proceeded to 23rd Street. Already Garvey was experiencing funding problems, there were difficulties in arranging insurance, and the short trip had to be made with the permission of the owners.

The second voyage on 24 November 1919 was to Sagua la Grande, Cuba, with a cargo of cement. On arrival in Cuba on 5 December, Cockburn complained to Garvey that the white officers were causing trouble and had tried to run the ship aground. However, she was warmly received in the port, the local stevedores banding together to invest $250 worth of shares in the venture. She sailed on to Jamaica and Panama, but there was no new cargo to pick up. On return from Cuba she had a full passenger list and cargo manifest, though hampered by repair problems, controversies amidst the officers and a crew shortchanged on wages. She returned in January 1920.

The third voyage, shortly after the onset of Prohibition, was to deliver whiskey from the Green River Distillery to Cuba. She had been laden with haste as the Prohibition amendment was to be enacted the next day.

Garvey wrote: "I was therefore called upon to spend $11,000 for repairs in order to have the ship sail with the cargo valued at $5 million," – Garvey claimed elsewhere a value of $2 million – "on which the company was collecting only $7,000 as freight, all because of the disobedience of two officers of the company". The deal for carriage of the whiskey was 10 percent of what it would have cost the distiller from any other shipping company and it had onerous full indemnity clauses attached, something unusual at the time.

The ship left New York on 17 January in a hurry. At Cape May the cargo shifted, and she was listing badly. Two days out, she was reported 101 miles (163 km) out of the port, sailing erratically, slowly sinking, with an intoxicated crew.

The United States Coast Guard insisted on her being towed home. A salvage tug company arrived on the scene (which had to be paid for in arrears), but the Yarmouth returned to port under her own power, thus avoiding becoming a salvage prize. The Reverend Dr. R. D. Jonas, Secretary of the League of Darker Peoples, was to claim that the captain had thwarted a hijacking plot involving a following vessel, and sabotage of a seacock being opened by an engineer to start a leak. One account says that Cockburn himself ordered that 500 cases of whiskey and champagne be thrown overboard to reduce weight. The jettisoned goods were picked up by small boats "suspiciously" on hand.

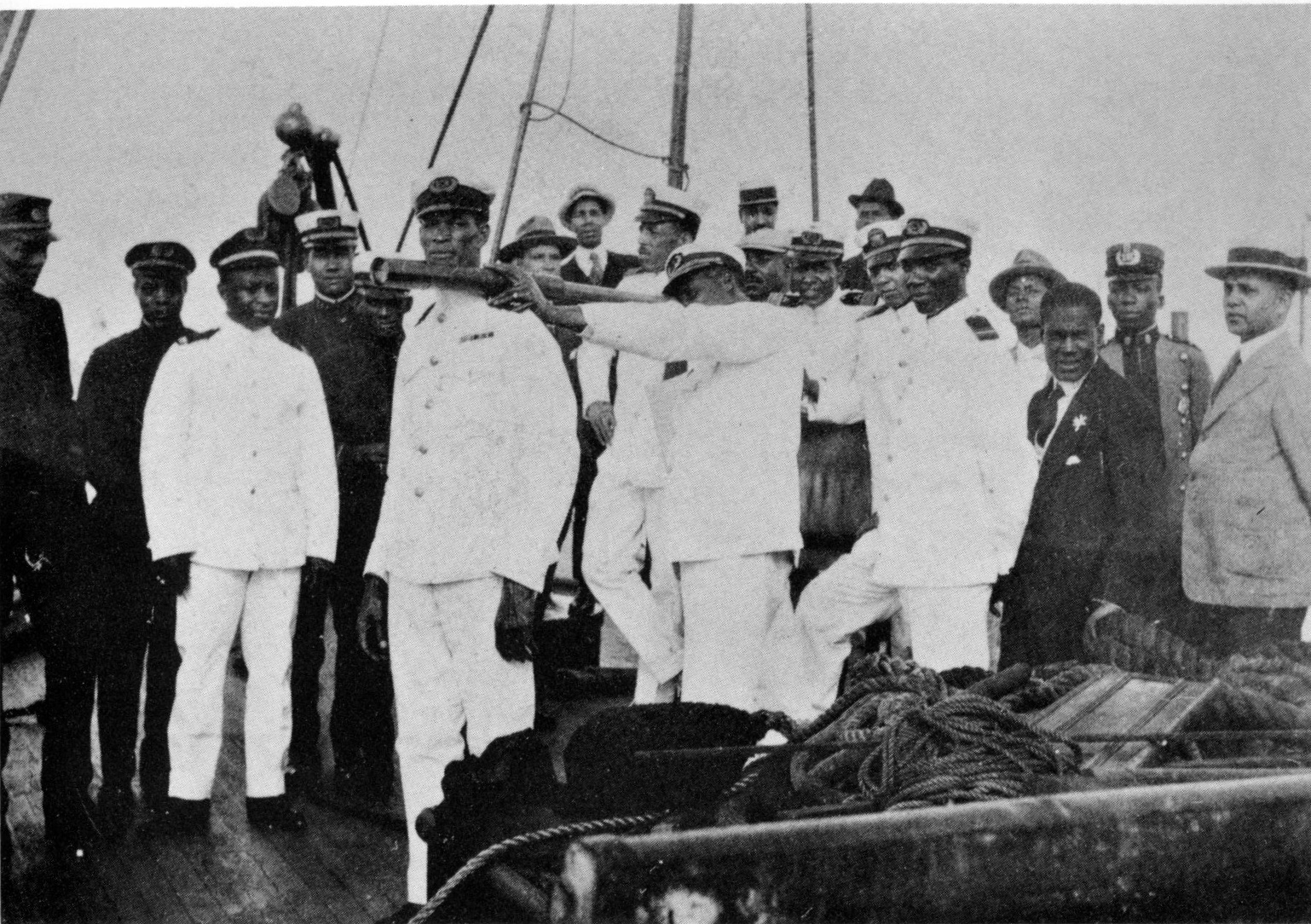
Crew of the S.S. Yarmouth, c. 1920

The valuable cargo had suffered losses from the crew and also from dockside repair workers. Workmen had been caught pilfering 56 bottles. This prompted the temporary impoundment of the cargo by government agents. More politics: Garvey was to assert: "I want to tell you that we have really made history, for that whiskey is from the South and it belongs to Southern Crackers, too. The BSL would at the end of the day pay out in damages more to the distillery than it charged for freighting the cargo.

After completion of very expensive temporary repairs, the Yarmouth sailed again. The repairs had been authorized without quotation and arguments of overpricing ensued. These repairs took place in the large sectional floating dry dock of the Morse Dry Dock and Repair Company of Brooklyn (see photo). The dock was the largest floating dock in the world, capable of lifting a 725-foot (221 m) long, 30,000 gross ton steamship, or two smaller ships simultaneously. No doubt Garvey would have wanted alternative arrangements for repair, but his hand was forced by circumstances.

On the Yarmouth's arrival in Cuba, the Evening News (Havana, 25 February 1920) reported that she had been proclaimed the "Ark of the Covenant of the colored people and a bright harbinger of better days".

In April 1920, Black Star bought its second ship, the Shady Side (a Hudson River excursion boat), and by early May 1920, the Kanawha, a yacht.

== Fate of the Yarmouth ==
On her return in May 1920, the Yarmouth ran aground off Boston. She was to make her final voyage under a new captain to the West Indies. Then in the fall of 1920 while at anchor in New York, she was involved in a collision, began to sink, and was towed to dock for repair. Meanwhile, Black Star had to defer payments; their income of $44,779.71 could not keep pace with operating losses of $138,469.55 (not including office expenses, salaries, legal fees, and the costs of selling stock), and in November 1921, by court order, she was sold at public auction by the United States Marshal's office for $1,625. The BSL took out an appeal over the unfavourable decision, but the case was dismissed with costs for non-prosecution, a bill later paid by a bonding company as the BSL by then was out of business.

The Yarmouth was broken up by the Pottsdown Steel Co. of Philadelphia.

The BSL in its lifetime was to visit ports in Costa Rica, Cuba, Jamaica, Panama, and other countries; however, it was never to reach Africa.

== The Mail Fraud case ==
The Black Star Line collapsed through mismanagement, and Marcus Garvey's downfall was complete when irregularities in his business dealings left him open to charges of mail fraud. The ongoing investigations by the Bureau of Investigation culminated in a trial held in New York City, which began on 18 May 1923. This trial proved to be a source for future historians of verifiable and contested facts; for example the subject of the actual value of the Yarmouth when bought in 1919 was brought up. One of her officers asserted that since the ship had been used in the coal trade, she was "not worth a penny above $25,000". The prosecution asserted that having been used as a cattle boat, she was unfit for passenger use.
