= Shadyside =

Shadyside or Shady Side or variation, may refer to:

== Places in the United States ==
(by state)

- Shady Side, Maryland, a settlement in Anne Arundel County
- Shadyside, Edgewater, a neighborhood of Edgewater, New Jersey
- Shadyside, Michigan, an unincorporated community
- Shadyside, Ohio, a village in Belmont County, Ohio
- Shadyside (Pittsburgh), a neighborhood of Pittsburgh, Pennsylvania
- Shadyside, Houston, a community in Houston, Texas

== Other uses ==
- Shadyside (Natchez, Mississippi), a historic house listed on the National Register of Historic Places
- Shady Side Academy, a school in Pittsburgh, Pennsylvania
- Shady Side (steamboat), built 1873
- Bedford Shadyside, the original name of The Chickenburger in Bedford, Nova Scotia
- Shadyside, a fictional town in the Fear Street books by R. L. Stine

== See also ==
- Sunnyside (disambiguation)
- Shady (disambiguation)
- Side (disambiguation)
