= Sunshade =

Sunshade may refer to:

- Brise soleil, architectural sunshades
- Shade (shadow), the blocking of sunlight by any object
- Space sunshade, a device for blocking a star's rays in space
- Umbrella, a device for blocking sunlight or rain
- Windshield sun shades, used to block sunlight in a car

== See also ==
- Shade sail
- Canopy (architecture)
- Gazebo
