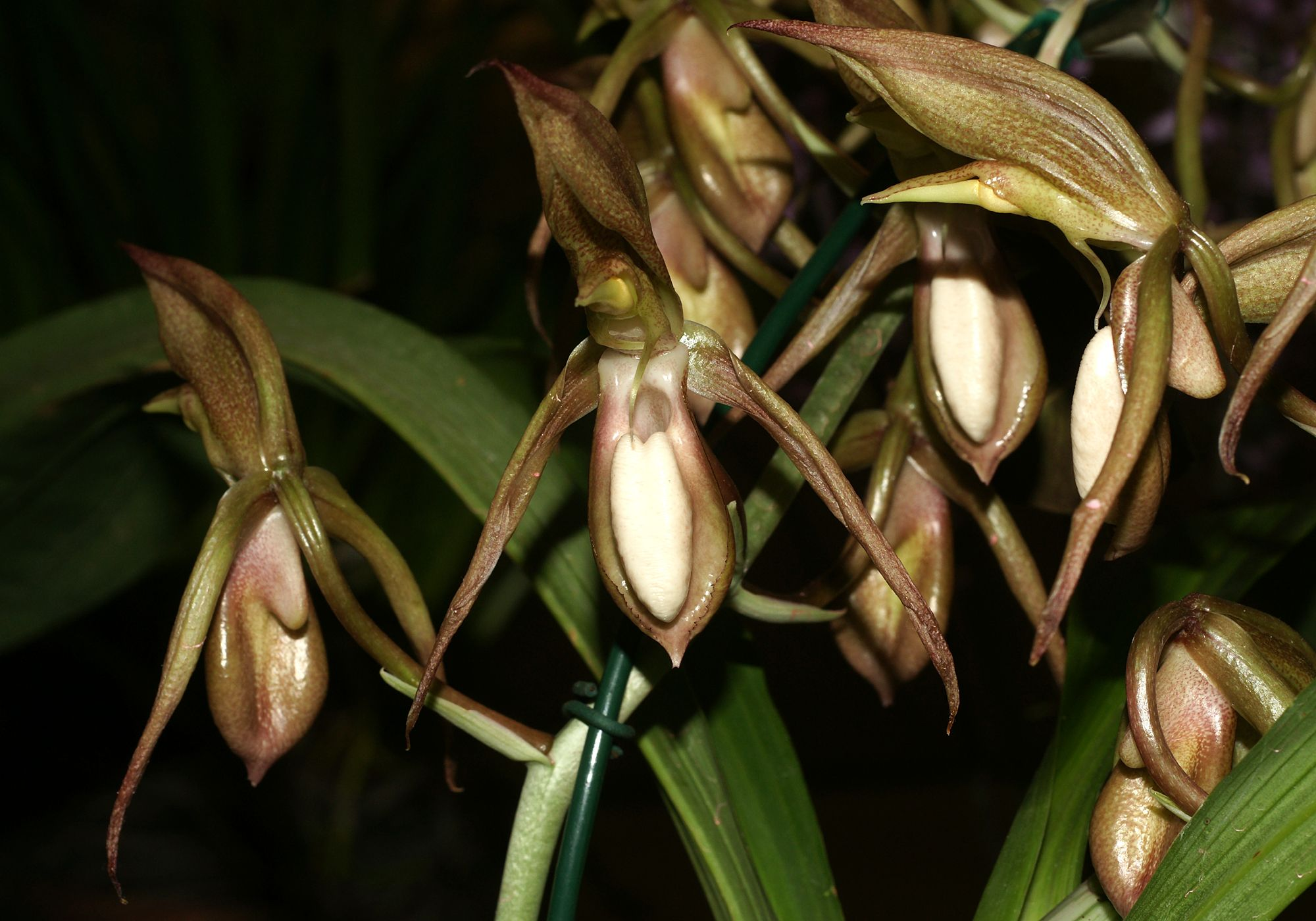

Scientific classification
- Kingdom: Plantae
- Clade: Tracheophytes
- Clade: Angiosperms
- Clade: Monocots
- Order: Asparagales
- Family: Orchidaceae
- Subfamily: Epidendroideae
- Genus: Catasetum
- Species: C. tabulare

Binomial name
- Catasetum tabulare John Lindley
- The distribution of the Catasetum tabulare

Synonyms
- Catasetum finetianum L.Linden & Cogn.; Catasetum pallidiflorum Schltr.; Catasetum pallidum Mansf.; Catasetum rhamphastos Kraenzl.

= Catasetum tabulare =

Species of orchid

Catasetum tabulare, the table-like catasetum, is a epiphytic pseudobulbeous species of orchid endemic to Colombia.

== Description ==
Flower

Its male flowers are green to brown in its petals and sepals, white with pink spots in the labellum (lip), and a white yellowish-green color above the pseudostigma. Its female flowers are almost fully green or yellowish-green. Like all the other members of the genus Catasetum, Catasetum tabulare has a catapult trigger mechanism that launches pollinium onto a pollinator once its sensitive antennae are triggered.

== Care ==
Catasetum tabulare is a sun-loving plant that needs a light level of approximately 45000 lux, 50% shade, and it also endures 40-50% humidity levels but grows best at 70%. It also goes into a leaf-drop state during winter like other Catasetum species.

== Distribution ==
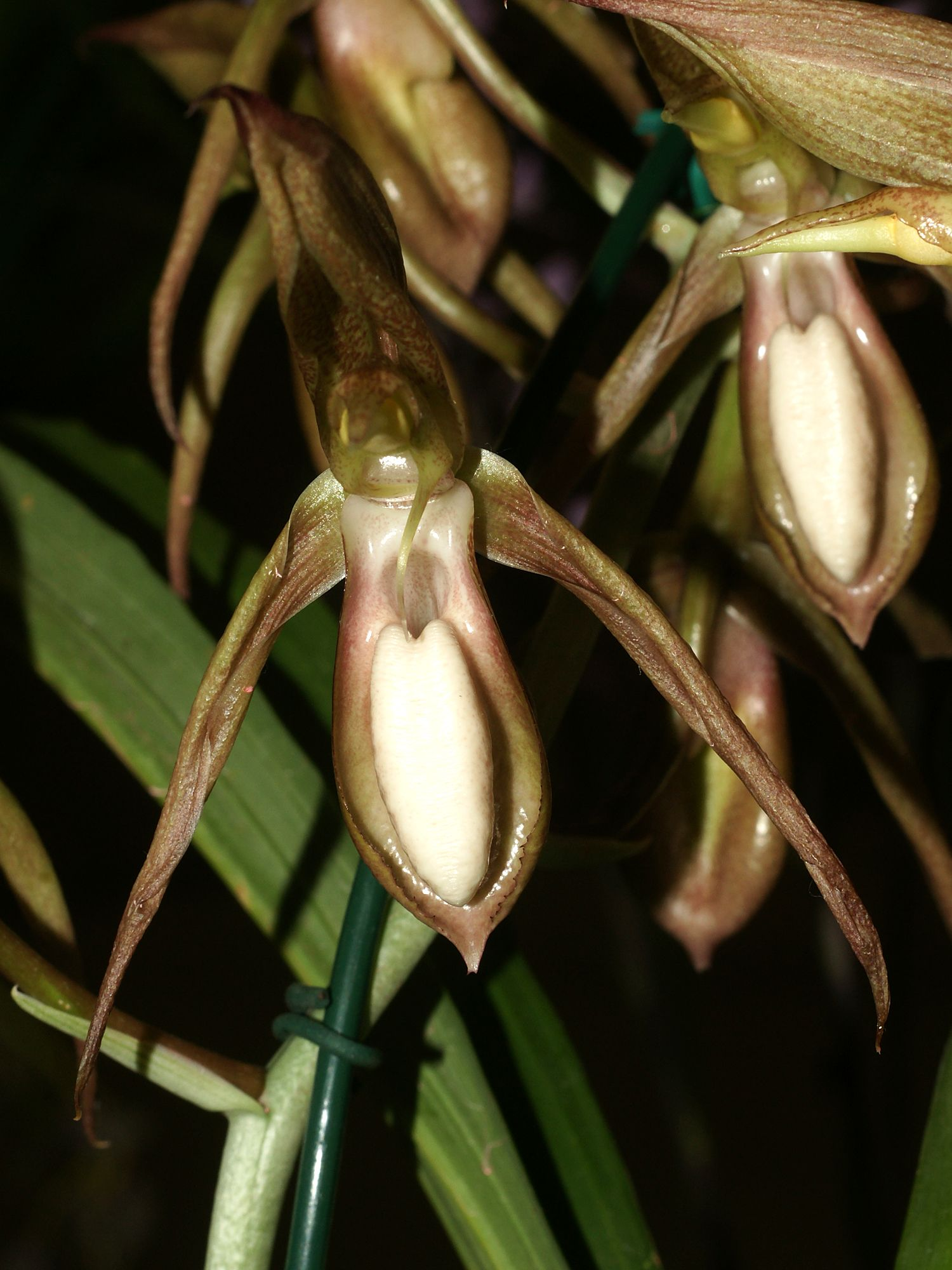
Another view of the flower

Catasetum tabulare is a species endemic to Colombia. It grows in rainforests by the Cauca River and its basin. Their natural habitat has a humid, moist, and tropical climate stays for the whole year, including the dry season.

== Taxonomy and etymology ==
Close-up image of a Catasetum tabulare flower

Catasetum tabulare was first described in Edwards's Botanical Register in Volume 30, Miscellaneous section, page 35 by John Lindley.
