= Shady =

Shady or shady may refer to:

== Places ==
- Shady, Iran (disambiguation)
- Şada, Azerbaijan
- Shady, New York
- Shady, Oregon

== People ==
=== Nickname ===
- David Baker (singer), former vocalist with the band, Mercury Rev who produced the album World under the name Shady
- Eminem (born 1972), American rapper whose alter-ego is Slim Shady
- LeSean McCoy (born 1988), American football running back nicknamed "Shady McCoy"
- Shady Blaze (born 1987), American hip hop artist
- Shady Nate (born 1988), American rapper from Oakland

=== Given name ===
- Shady Alsuleiman (born 1978), president of the Australian National Imams Council
- Shady El-Helw (born 1979), Egyptian male water polo player
- Shady Mohamed (born 1977), Egyptian who played professional football

=== Surname ===
- Ruth Shady (born 1946), Peruvian anthropologist and archaeologist

== Other uses ==
- Shady Records, a record label owned by Eminem
- Shady XV, a hip hop compilation album performed by various artists of Shady Records
- "Shady", a song by Adam Lambert from his 2012 album Trespassing

== See also ==
- Shade (disambiguation)
- Shady Lady (disambiguation)
- Shadyside (disambiguation)
