= Shade sail =

Sailcloth stretched to create shade

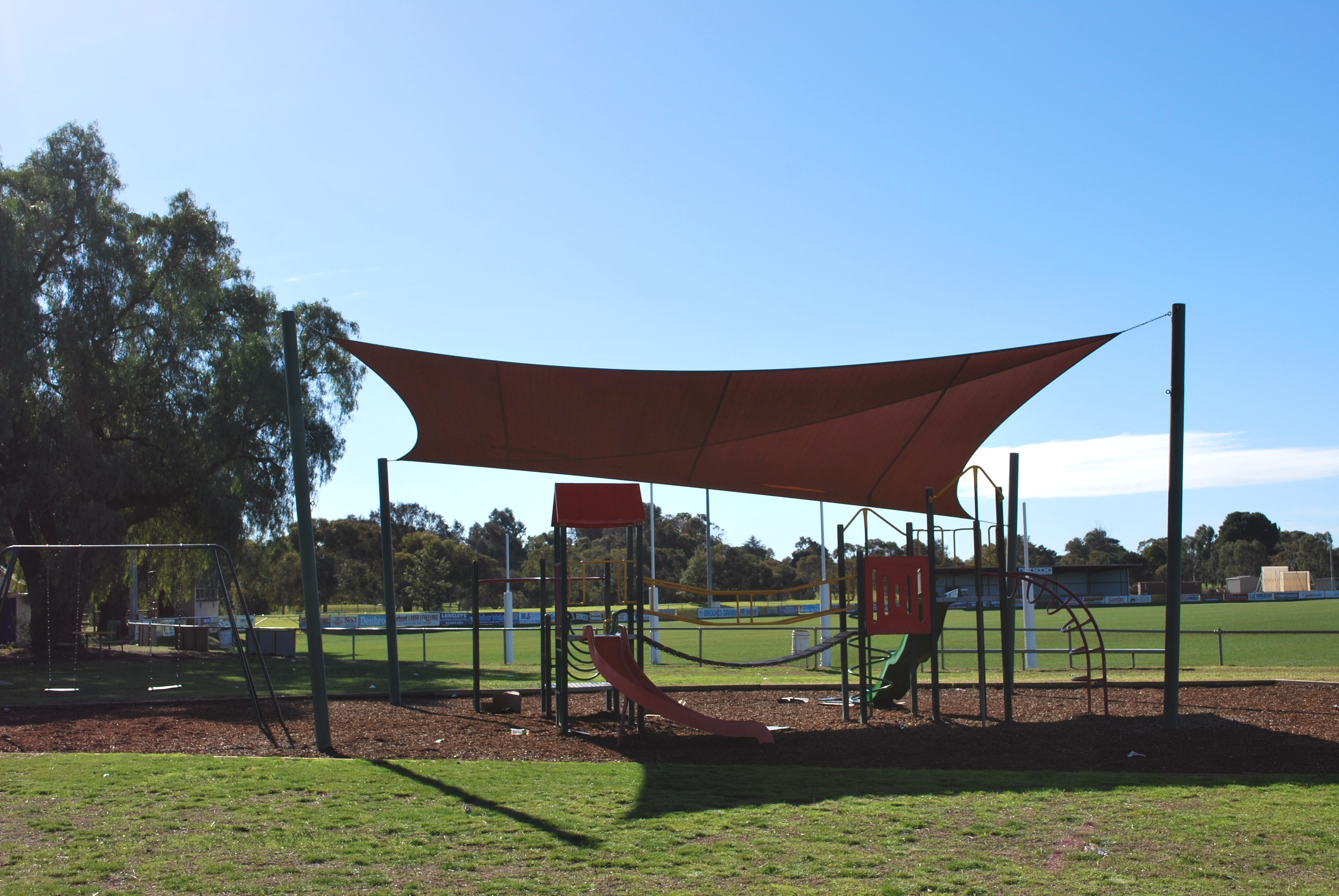
Shade sail over playground in Australia

A shade sail − or somewhat more precise a textile sunshade sail or a textile sun protection sail − is a device to create outdoor shade (shadow) based on the textile basic technology that can be found in a ship's sail. Shade sails use a flexible membrane tensioned between several anchor points. While generally installed permanently, they are cheap and easy to set up. They are usually provided above public gathering places such as seating areas and playgrounds in countries where strong sun radiation makes prolonged stays in the open sun unpleasant or dangerous due to sunburn and skin cancer risk.

== History ==
Ancient Egyptians and later the Greeks and Romans used large pieces of fabric to provide shade. The Colosseum in Rome was shaded with large canvas "sails" pulled into place by Roman sailors. Modern shade sails came into wider use with the invention of a far more durable and relatively inexpensive fabric called shade cloth. Useful versions of shade cloth appeared in the early 1990s especially in Australia and South Africa.

For most of the 1990s there was some confusion about what these new devices should be called however they are now most commonly called shade sails throughout Australia, South Africa and the U.S.A. Shade sails have yet to have a significant impact in Europe and South America. A number of Australian shade sail businesses export to other countries. Rapid growth in the "shade sail industry" has seen many new businesses and websites offering shade sails and shade structures.

== Current technology ==
A shade covering play area

Originally shade fabric, like all fabrics in the outdoors, suffered from UV degradation. UV inhibitors are now added during the manufacture of shade cloth and good shade cloth now generally comes with a multi-year UV degradation warranties. Shade cloth is a knitted fabric and this is an important factor in using it to design and manufacture shade sails. Shade fabrics are measured by their shade factor, which is the measure of how much a shade fabric absorbs or reflects invisible light (ultraviolet radiation). This is listed as a percentage out of 100, with a 100% shade factor indicating complete light blockage.

Successful shade sail design uses the inherent "stretch" of the knitted fabric to create three-dimensional shapes. Fabrics other than shade cloth are used to make shade sails such as PVC, a more expensive alternative, or canvas variations. The low cost of shade cloth and its ability to breathe makes it a prime choice for "cool shade".

== Installation ==
Modern purpose-made shade sails vary in shape, size and color and there is trend towards installing multiple sails, sometimes overlapping, thereby adding some form and style to its function. Shade sails are tensioned usually by means of either a stainless steel turnbuckle or a pulley system fixed at each corner of the sail. For permanently fixed sails, the turnbuckle provides the best means of fixing the canopy since it generally allows more tension to be applied. For sails that are used on an occasional basis, the pulley system is more practical since it can be set up and taken down in a couple of minutes.

For domestic applications of shade sails it is recommended to install them with a quick release "snap hook" at each corner. This allows the sail shade to be quickly taken down in high wind conditions or during the winter season. Correct installation requires that adequate and quite considerable tension be applied to the sail to allow it to adopt its correct shape and prevent flapping in the wind. It is important to ensure that the mounting points are substantial and secure both to be able to accept the required initial tension and to absorb the loads created by wind gusts hitting the sail.
