= Black Star Line =

Defunct Garveyist American shipping company

The Oceanic Steam Navigation Company (Black Star Line)
- House flag of Black Star Line

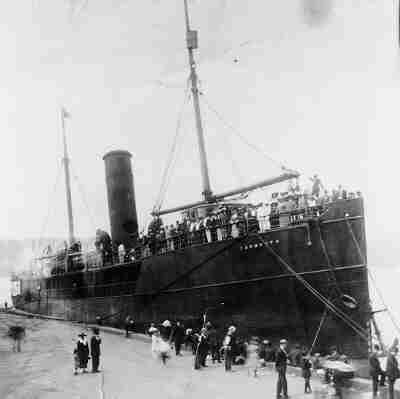
- Photo of Yarmouth, first ship in the Black Star Liner Fleet.
- Type: Partnership
- Industry: Shipping, transportation
- Founded: 1919
- Defunct: 1922
- Area served: Transatlantic

The Black Star Line (1919–1922) was a shipping line incorporated by Marcus Garvey, the organizer of the Universal Negro Improvement Association (UNIA), and other members of the UNIA. The shipping line was created to facilitate the transportation of goods and eventually African Americans throughout the African global economy. It derived its name from the White Star Line, a line whose success Garvey felt he could duplicate. The Black Star Line became a key part of Garvey's contribution to the Back-to-Africa movement, but it was mostly unsuccessful. It was only one among many businesses which the UNIA originated, such as the Universal Printing House, Negro Factories Corporation, and the widely distributed and highly successful Negro World weekly newspaper.

The Black Star Line and its successor, the Black Cross Navigation and Trading Company, operated between 1919 and the mid-1920s. It stands today as a major symbol for Garvey followers and Pan-Africanists. It is not to be confused with the later Black Star Line, the state shipping corporation of Ghana.

== History ==
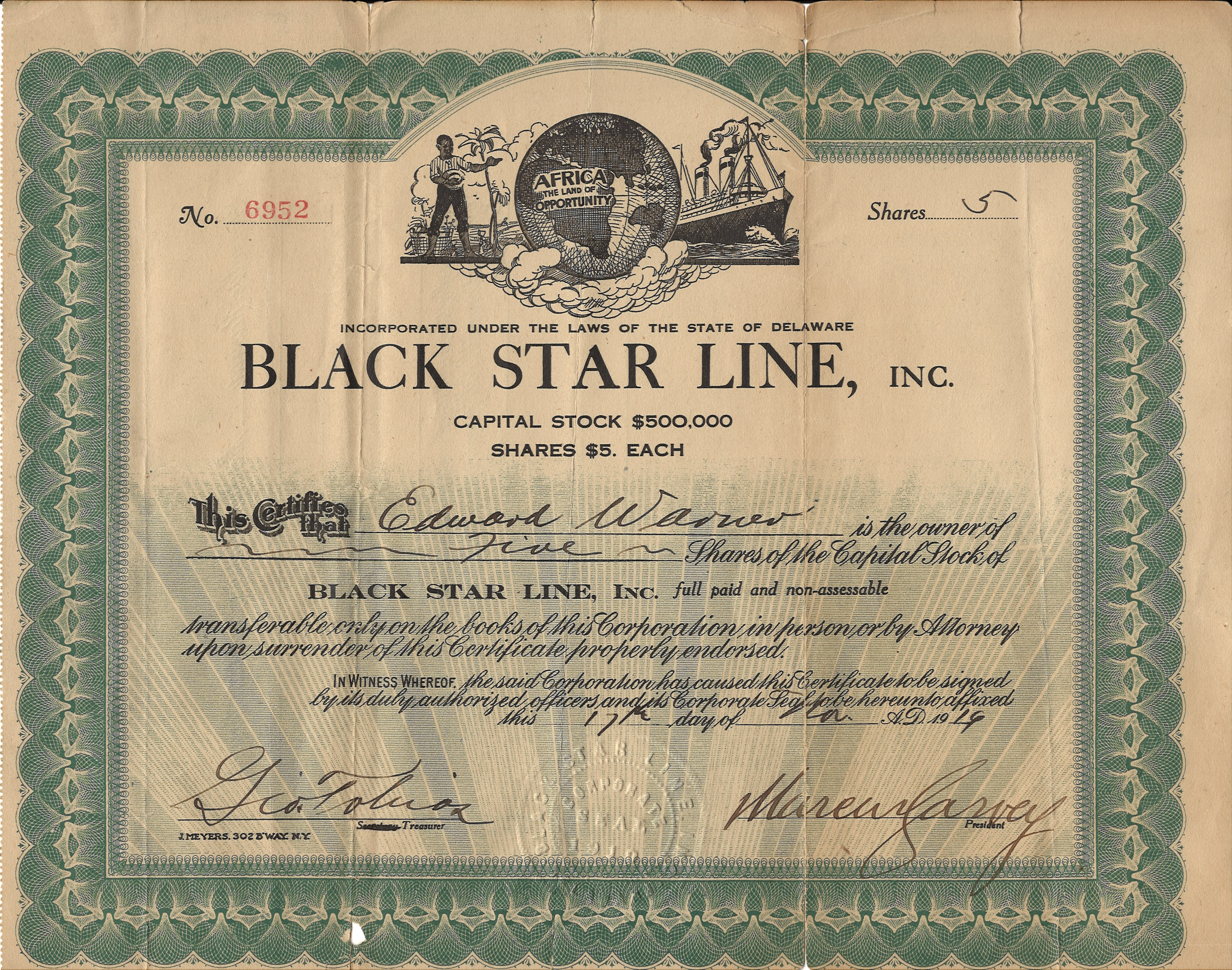
1919 Black Star Line stock certificate

The Black Star Line was incorporated as a Delaware corporation on June 27, 1919. Having a maximum capitalization of $500,000, BSL shares were sold at UNIA conventions at five dollars each.

The first directors of the Black Star Line were Marcus Garvey, Edgar M. Grey, Richard E. Warner, George Tobias, Jeremiah Certain, Henrietta Vinton Davis, and Janie Jenkins. The officers of the corporation were President Marcus Garvey, First Vice President — Jeremiah Certain, Second Vice President Henrietta Vinton Davis, Treasurer George Tobias, Secretary Richard E. Warner, Assistant Secretary Edgar M. Grey and Assistant Treasurer Janie Jenkins. Six months after incorporation the board of directors voted to increase the Black Star Line market capitalization to $10 million (equivalent to $186 million in 2025).

The Black Star Line surprised all its critics when, only three months after being incorporated, the first of four ships, Yarmouth was bought with the intention of renaming it Frederick Douglass. Yarmouth was a collier in the First World War, and was in poor condition when the Black Star Line bought her. Once reconditioned, Yarmouth sailed for three years between the US and the West Indies as the first Black Star Line ship with an all-black crew and a black captain. Later Joshua Cockburn, the captain of Yarmouth, was accused of receiving a "kick back from the purchase price".

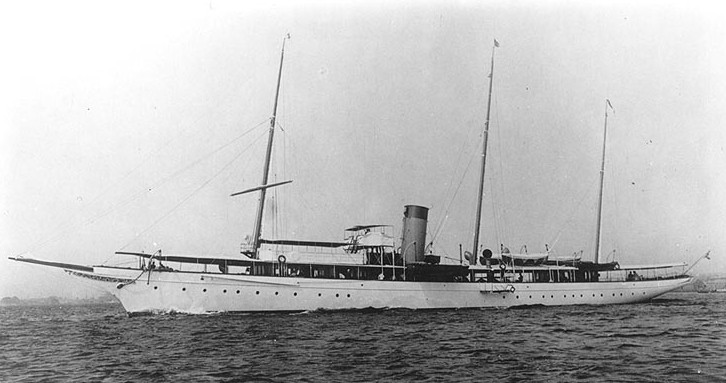
Kanawha before her purchase by the Black Star Line

Yarmouth was not the only ship that BSL bought in poor condition and completely oversold. Garvey spent another $200,000 for more ships (equivalent to $3.2 million in 2025). One, Shady Side, sailed the "cruise to nowhere" on the Hudson River one summer and sank the next fall because of a leak. Another was the steam yacht Kanawha, once owned by Henry Huttleston Rogers. Booker T. Washington had been an honored guest aboard the ship when it was owned by his friend and confidant, Rogers. However, Rogers had died in 1909, and the once well-maintained yacht had also served in the first World War. After having been renamed Antonio Maceo by the Black Star Line, it blew a boiler and killed a man.

Besides oversold and poorly conditioned ships, the Black Star Line was beset by mismanagement and infiltration by agents of J. Edgar Hoover's Bureau of Investigation (the forerunner to the Federal Bureau of Investigation), including the first African-American agent hired by the bureau, James Wormley Jones, who became an intimate of Garvey, and other agents who − according to historian Winston James − sabotaged it by throwing foreign matter into the fuel, damaging the engines. On its first commission, the Yarmouth brought a shipment of whiskey from the US to Cuba (before Prohibition) in record time, but because it did not have docking arrangements in Havana, it lost money sitting in the docks while the longshoremen had a strike. A cargo-load of coconuts rotted in the hull of a ship on another voyage because Garvey insisted on having the ships make ceremonial stops at politically important ports.

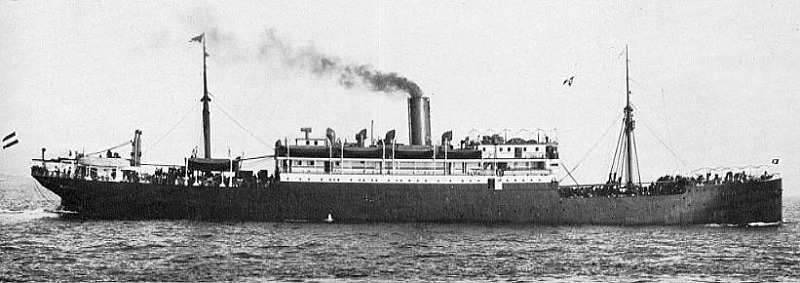
Orion

In 1919, J. Edgar Hoover and the BOI charged Marcus Garvey and three other officers with mail fraud. The prosecution stated that the brochure of the Black Star Line contained a picture of a ship that the BSL did not own. The ship pictured was Orion, which in the brochure was renamed Phyllis Wheatley. The BSL was trying to buy the ship at the time, but did not own her yet. The fact that the ship was not owned yet by the BSL constituted mail fraud. "In 1922, Garvey and three other Black Star Line officials were indicted by the US government for using the mails fraudulently to solicit stock for the recently defunct steamship line." On the witness stand, Garvey admitted that $600,000 ($11,541,000 in 2025) had been "blown to the wind". The jury convicted only Garvey, but not the other three officers, and he was sentenced to five years in prison. In 1927, President Calvin Coolidge deported Garvey back to Jamaica.

The Black Star Line was suspended by Garvey in February 1922, following his arrest on mail fraud charges. The Shady Side was abandoned on mudflats at Fort Lee, New Jersey. The line was reconstituted as the Black Cross Navigation and Trading Company thereafter, which purchased a new ship, the SS General G W Goethals, in October 1924. It was then renamed the SS Booker T. Washington. The ship sailed to Cuba and Panama in 1925, but it is unclear whether it ever returned to New York, due to lack of funds.

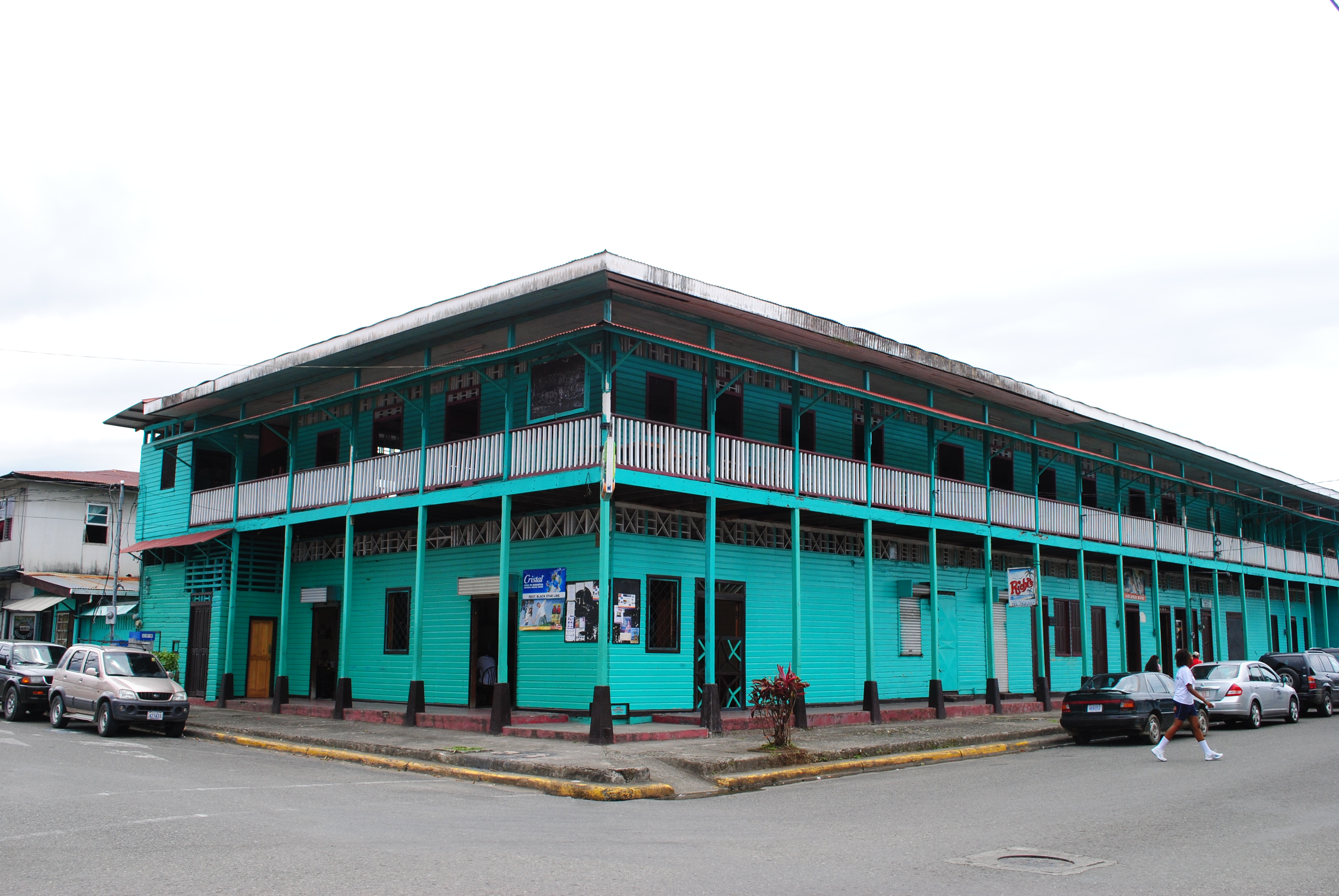
Liberty Hall, a.k.a. Black Star Line Building in Limón, Costa Rica. The original building was erected in 1922, and then used as UNIA and Black Star Line offices. It was damaged beyond repair by the Limon earthquake on April 22, 1991, and subsequently reconstructed based on the original plans. On April 29, 2016, a fire destroyed the building completely. After the fire, it was confirmed that the building would be rebuilt with aid from organizations and civilian donations.

== In popular culture ==
- Reggae singer Fred Locks re-introduced the Black Star Line to a Jamaican audience with his 1976 hit "Black Star Liner" (which has been called one of "the most important songs in reggae music of the 1970s"), portraying Garvey as a Moses-like prophet: "Seven miles of Black Star Liners coming in the harbor [...] I can hear the elders saying. These are the days for which we've been praying ... Marcus Garvey told us that the Black Star Liners are coming one day for us".
- The 1977 reggae album by Culture, Two Sevens Clash, featured a song called "Black Starliner Must Come".
- A 1978 reggae song named "Black Star Liner" by The Regulars (later renamed to Reggae Regular) appears to still be a popular song on YouTube. Also Black Slate on their album Amigo recorded a song called "Freedom Time (Black Star Liner)", with references to Marcus Garvey and "seven miles of Black Star Liner".
- The Black Star Line was also commemorated by blues singers such as Hazel Meyers and Rosa Henderson; by the musical group Brand Nubian (on their 1993 album In God We Trust); and by Ranking Dread with "Black Starlina" on his Kunta Kinte Roots album.
- "Train to Zion" by Linval Thompson (writer) and U Brown featured the lines: "Train to Zion is coming / Don't want no one to miss it / It's the Black Star Liner / It's going to Zion..."
- Black Star Liner was the name of a British electronic group, who won a Mercury Music Prize nomination in 1999 for their album Bengali Batam Youth Foundation.
- "Marcus Senior" by Burning Spear on their Marcus' Children album, contained lyrics about the struggle Marcus Garvey endured.
- Spanish singer-songwriter Javier Ruibal sings about the North American slaves' dream of going back to their plundered and subdued Africa, in his song "Black Star Line". Ruibal sings along with Chico Cesar and the song was released on his 2018 album "Paraisos Mejores".
- Black Star is the group name adopted by Mos Def and Talib Kweli for their work as a duo. Their 1998 album Mos Def & Talib Kweli Are Black Star, was a reference to Garvey and the Black Star Line.
- In the Xenowealth series of future science fiction novels by Caribbean-American author Tobias Buckell, the Black Starliner Corporation is an interstellar shipping company responsible for resettling marginalized, primarily Black, emigrants from Earth on a number of terraformed planets.
- The BlackStar Film Festival, a Philadelphia film festival focused on films about and by black, brown and indigenous people from around the world, was named after the shipping company.
- Black Star Line Festival, founded in 2022 by the artist Chance the Rapper was inspired by the shipping company.

== Legacy ==
The flag of Ghana features a black star on its flag in tribute to Marcus Garvey's Black Star Line

The flag of Ghana adopted a black star as an homage to their own shipping line, The Black Star Line, which was the national shipping corporation of Ghana.

== Bibliography ==
Notes

References

- The Broad Ax (May 13, 1922). "Col. Marcus Garvey, President of the Black Star Line Steam ship Company, Admitted on the Witness Stand in New York City That More Than $600,000 Has Been Blown to the Wind". The Broad Ax. Julius F. Taylor. ISSN 2163-7202. OCLC 10392922.
- Garvey, Marcus (1995). Hill, Robert Abraham (ed.). The Marcus Garvey and Universal Negro Improvement Association Papers, Vol. IX: Africa for the Africans June 1921-December 1922. University of California Press. ISBN 9780520916821. - Total pages: 840
- Grant, Colin (2009). Negro with a Hat: The Rise and Fall of Marcus Garvey. Vintage. ISBN 9780099501459. - Total pages: 560
- Murdock, George W. (April 4, 1939). "Hudson River Steamboats. No.86-Shady Side". The Kingston Daily Freeman.
- Murillo-Chaverri, Carmmen (1999). "Vaivén de arraigos y desarraigos: Identidad afrocaribeña en Costa Rica 1870-1940" (PDF). Revista de Historia. 39 (enero–junio, 1999). ISSN 1012-9790. Archived from the original (PDF) on February 16, 2016.
- Springer, Robert & Randall Cherry, John Cowley, David Evans (2006). Nobody Knows where the Blues Come from: Lyrics and History. University Press of Mississippi. ISBN 9781578067978. - Total pages: 303
