= Shady Lady =

Shady Lady may refer to:

- Shady Lady (1945 film)
- Shady Lady (aircraft), B-24 Liberator aircraft
- Shady Lady, a 2012 film about the aircraft Shady Lady
- Shady Lady Ranch, a brothel in Nevada
- Shady Lady, a boat design by Phil Bolger
- Shady Lady (musical), a 1933 musical by Jesse Greer and Sam H. Stept

== Music ==
- "Shady Lady" (Gene Pitney song), a 1970 song
- "Shady Lady" (Ani Lorak song), a 2008 song
- "Shady Lady" (Shepstone & Dibbens), a 1973 song by Shepstone & Dibbens from "Shady Lady"
- "Shady Lady", a 1975 song by Uriah Heep from Return to Fantasy
- "Shady Lady", a 1979 song by Status Quo from Whatever You Want
- "Shady Lady", a 1971 song by Quincy Jones from Dollar$
- "Shady Lady", a 2014 song by B.A.P. from First Sensibility

Artikel Overleg
