= Shady Lady (aircraft) =

Shady Lady was a Consolidated B-24 Liberator aircraft that in August 1943 flew one of World War II's longest bombing missions, from Darwin in Australia to the oil refineries at Balikpapan in the East Kalimantan province on the island of Borneo, Indonesia.

Shortly before running out of fuel on the return flight from the target, Shady Lady was crash-landed on a remote salt pan in northern Western Australia after flying for 16 hours and 35 minutes. With help from the people in the Aboriginal community, Shady Lady was eventually repaired and flew back to base.

== 380th Bombardment Group ==
Shady Lady was part of the 380th Bombardment Group which flew B-24 bombers in the South West and Western Pacific areas in WWII. Known as the "Flying Circus" and "King Of The Heavies", the 380th Bombardment Group went overseas in April 1943 and was placed under the control of the Royal Australian Air Force (RAAF) and assigned to the Australian North West Area Command operating out of Darwin, Northern Territory.

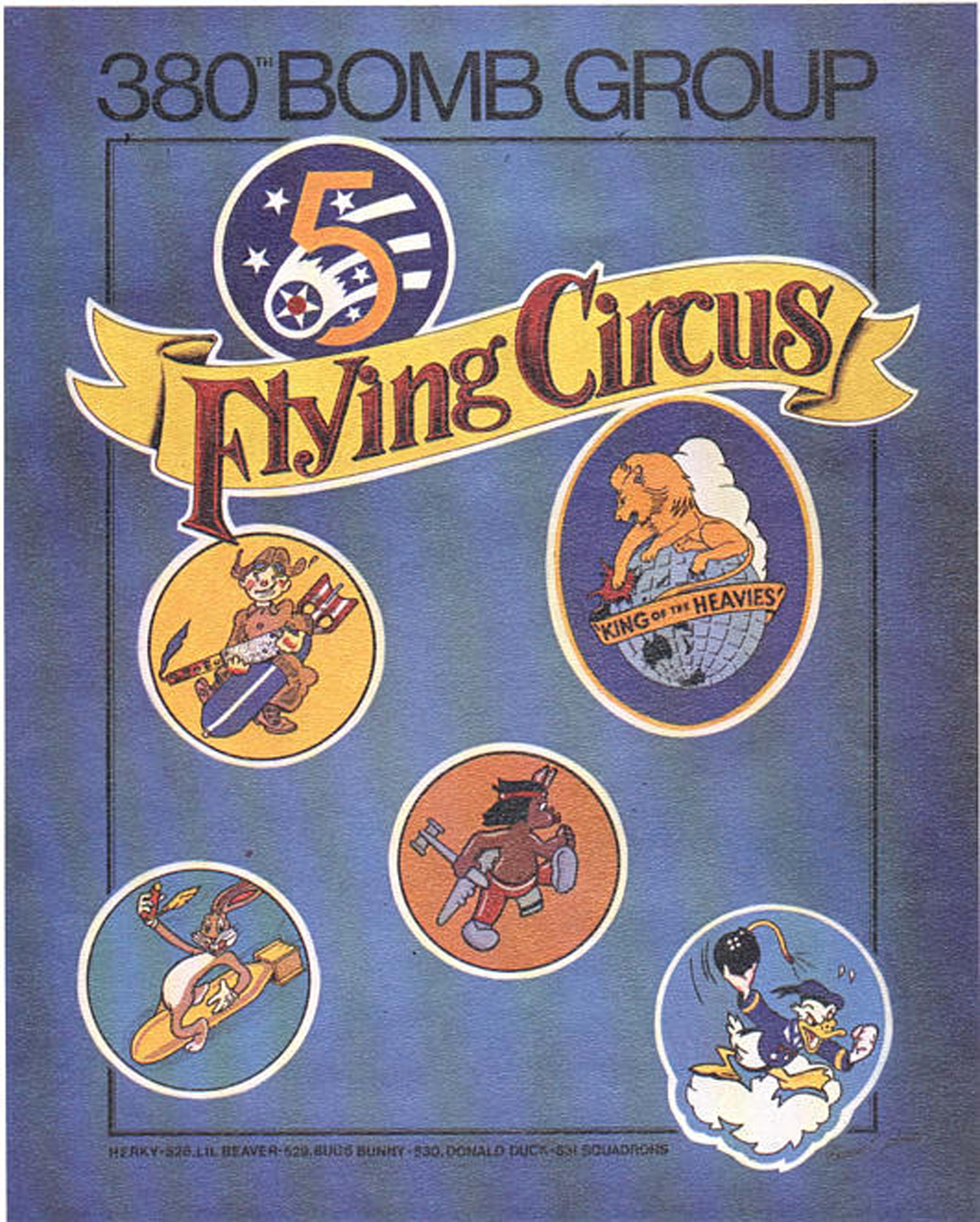
380th Bombardment Group

== Historical context ==
On 19 February 1942, 10 weeks after leading the attack on Pearl Harbor, Japanese bomber pilot Mitsuo Fuchida, flying from the same aircraft carrier, attacked Darwin.

The Japanese air raids on Darwin, often called the "Pearl Harbor of Australia," used more aircraft, sank more boats and dropped more bombs than at Pearl Harbor and dealt a psychological blow to the Australian population, just weeks after hostilities with Japan had begun.

Australia was determined to strike back and therefore welcomed the arrival in Australia in 1943 of the American 380th Bombardment Group and its long-range Consolidated B-24 Liberator bomber aircraft.

== Mission ==
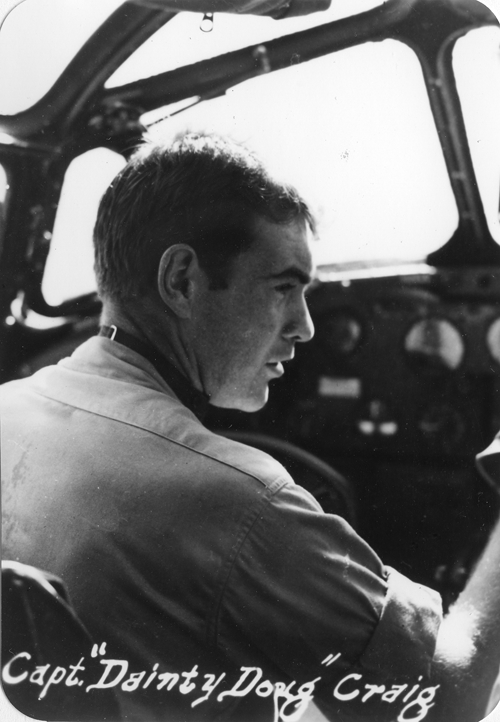
First Lieutenant Doug Craig

In evaluating how to strike back at the Japanese, RAAF intelligence knew that half of all lubricating oils used by the Japanese military and 60 percent of all their aviation fuel came from refineries in Borneo. The target was hundreds of miles behind enemy lines which some believed would be impossible to reach. After carrying out many long-range test flights using newly developed cruise techniques to increase range, the mission was approved.

On August 13 1943, carrying a crew of 10 and one RAAF photographer, Shady Lady was one of eleven bombers that followed the setting sun westward past Timor into heavily defended enemy territory.

Commanded by First Lieutenant Doug Craig, Shady Lady experienced tropical thunderstorms that caused severe turbulence and greatly hampered the ability of navigator John Nash to carry out celestial navigation.

Nine of the eleven aircraft that set off arrived individually at their target, the other two turning back due to bad weather. Shady Lady was the last to arrive and tasked with not only attacking the target but to also photograph it. More tropical thunderstorms were encountered on the return journey. At dawn the Shady Lady crew realised they were miles off course and if they had any chance of getting back to Australia alive they needed to overfly a main Japanese air base in Timor. Shady Lady was intercepted by two Japanese fighters, but after continuous attacks she finally escaped when they gave up and she headed for Australia.

== Crash landing and rescue ==
With fuel all but gone Lieutenant Craig was preparing to ditch the aircraft when the northern coast of Australia was sighted. With only minutes of fuel remaining, he noticed a saltpan near the coast and prepared the crew for an emergency landing. The nose wheel collapsed and there was damage to the front of the aircraft, but there were no serious injuries.

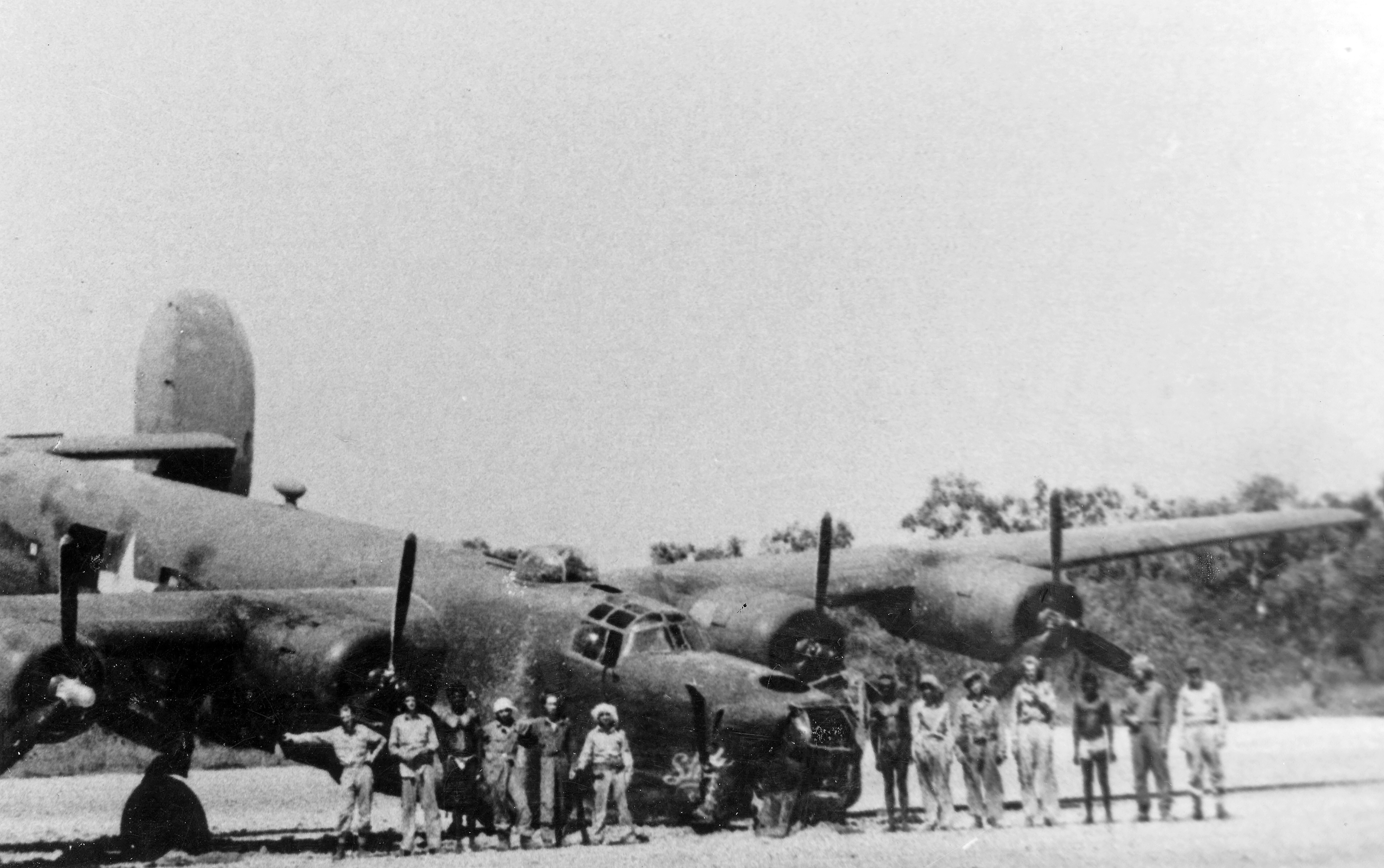
Shady Lady on the salt pan, August 1943

It was 0945 hrs, 16 hours and 35 minutes since their departure from Darwin, making it one of the longest bombing missions carried out to that day.

Radio contact was eventually established with Darwin and provided the stranded airmen with the hope of rescue the following afternoon. This hope materialized in the form of Father Seraphim Sanz, the priest at a local mission.

A race against time had started, because the saltpan was due to flood as soon as the wet season arrived. Engineers were brought in to make temporary repairs to the aircraft in extreme heat conditions where there was little water and limited facilities. Crews worked around the clock to fix and lighten the aircraft by removing unnecessary parts such as armament and ammunition.

New parts and fuel had to be brought to Shady Lady and this was done by Aborigines who carried them over very difficult terrain for tens of miles. With only days to spare, Shady Lady was finally pushed back and prepared for the flight to Fenton Airfield south of Darwin. Shady Lady's final flight was to Garbutt Field near Townsville. Despite the effort that had been put into the aircraft's recovery, the airframe was stripped for parts before being scrapped.

== Crash site ==
The site where Shady Lady landed is today an Australian Heritage Site (noted in the Australian Heritage Database) with parts of the aircraft still resting there and the tracks from her landing still visible due to the geological features of the area.

== Presidential Citation ==
Alice Craig, wife of the commander Doug Craig, was presented in August 2011 with a Presidential Citation by Major Christopher M Westhoff, US Marine Attaché in Canberra. The citation was issued to Alice just days before she visited the crash site on 14 August 2011. It was 68 years to the day since Shady Lady had crash landed there.

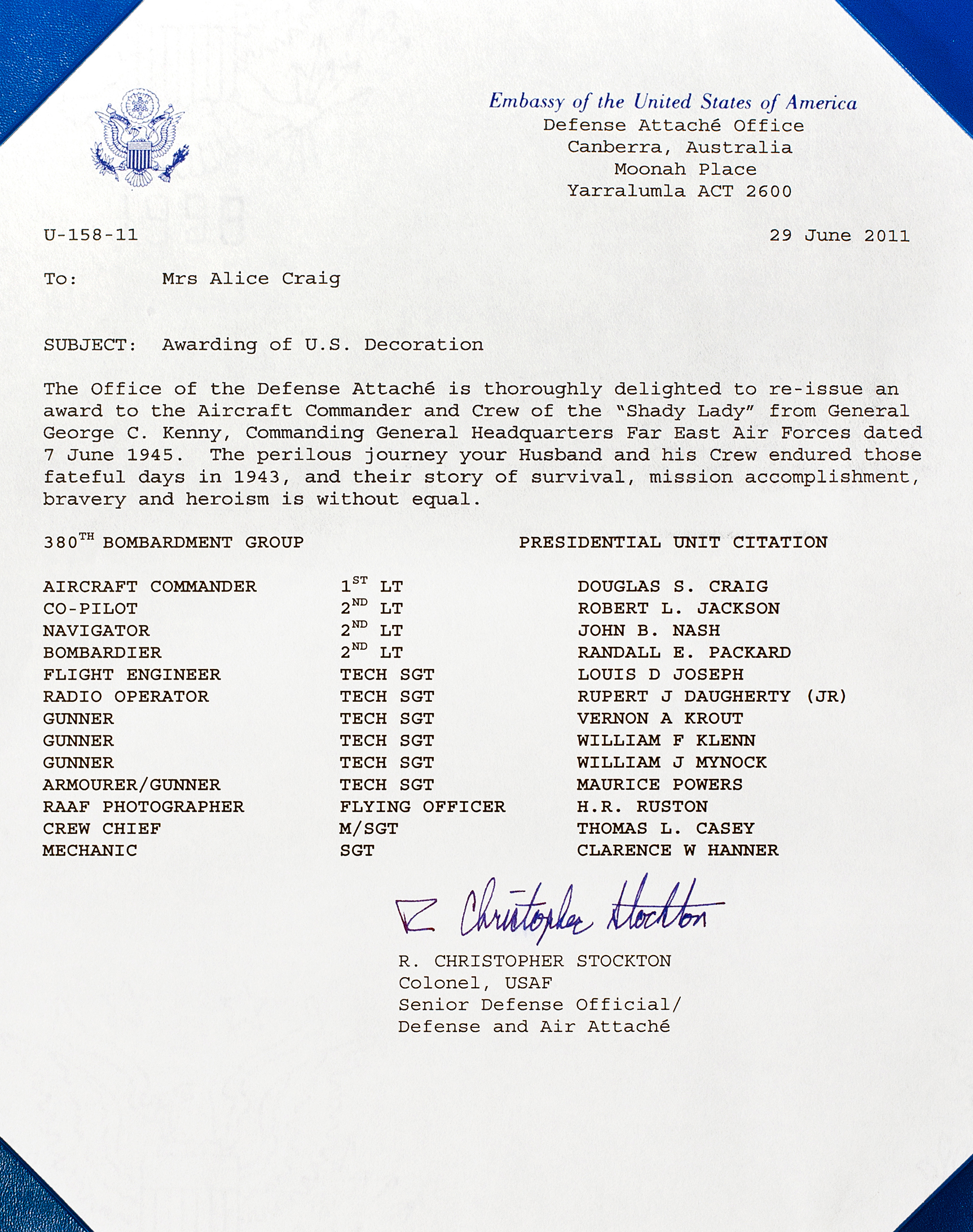
Presidential Citation issued for the Shady Lady crew on 29 June 2011

== Documentary ==
A British documentary film entitled Shady Lady, was released in 2012. The last surviving crew member, Technical Sergeant Louis Joseph (Flight Engineer), age 92, was able to attend the premiere.

Principal photography started in August 2011. Filming took place in Australia, the U.S., and England, and was completed in January 2012.

In-flight sequences for the film were filmed using a B-24 owned by The Collings Foundation.
