= Shade, Kentucky =

Unincorporated community in Kentucky, United States

- Unincorporated community
- Location within the state of Kentucky Shade (the United States)
- Coordinates: 37°38′30″N 83°51′53″W
- Country: United States
- State: Kentucky
- County: Estill
- Elevation: 653 ft (199 m)
- Time zone: UTC-5 (Eastern (EST))
  - Summer (DST): UTC-4 (EDT)
- GNIS feature ID: 515332

Shade is an unincorporated community located in Estill County, Kentucky, United States. Its post office is closed.
