= Eric Shade (footballer) =

Australian rules footballer, born 1912

Personal information
- Full name: Eric Vincent Shade
- Born: 3 October 1912; Woods Point, Victoria
- Died: 10 March 1984 (aged 71); Frankston, Victoria
- Original team: Williamstown CYMS (CYMSFA)
- Height: 170 cm (5 ft 7 in)
- Weight: 65 kg (143 lb)

Playing career^{1}
Years	Club	Games (Goals)
1929–30	Footscray	20 (11)
1931–33	Williamstown (VFA)	37 (25)
- ^{1} Playing statistics correct to the end of 1933.

Eric Vincent Shade (3 October 1912 – 10 March 1984) was an Australian rules footballer who played with Footscray in the Victorian Football League (VFL).

Shade later served in the Royal Australian Navy during World War II.
