= Eric Shade (cricketer) =

Australian cricketer (born 1943)

Personal information
- Born: 27 August 1943 (age 83); Melbourne, Australia

Domestic team information
- Years: Team
- 1966-1970: Victoria
- Source: Cricinfo, 4 December 2015

Eric Shade (born 27 August 1943) is an Australian former cricketer. He played five first-class cricket matches for Victoria between 1966 and 1970.

== See also ==
- List of Victoria first-class cricketers
