= Shady Side (steamboat) =

Steamboat

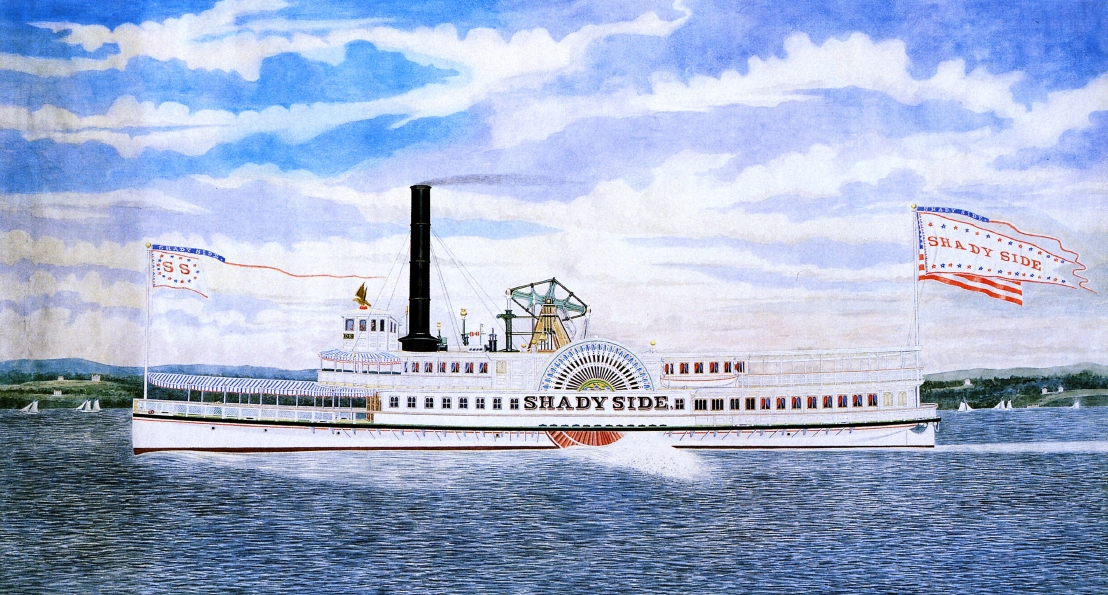
- Shady Side, watercolor on paper by James Bard.

History
- Name: Shady Side
- Route: New York Harbor
- Laid down: 1873
- In service: 1873
- Out of service: 1922
- Fate: Abandoned

General characteristics
- Type: inland boat passenger/freighter, wooden hull
- Installed power: vertical beam steam engine
- Propulsion: sidewheels

Shady Side was a steamboat that operated in New York Harbor and nearby areas starting in 1873.

== Construction ==
Shady Side was built in 1873 at Bulls Ferry. She was described in later service as "one of the handsomest passenger-boats on Long Island Sound", and in reminiscences from 1939 as "a remarkably swift and handsome steamboat of medium size". She had a licensed capacity of 600 passengers in 1880, and 700 in 1899.

Shady Side's engines were made by Fletcher, Harrison and Company. Her wooden hull was 168 feet 1 inch (51.23 m) long, with a beam breadth of 27 feet 5 inches (8.36 m), a hold depth of 9 feet 5 inches (2.87 m). Her gross tonnage was 444 and her net tonnage 329.

== Service ==
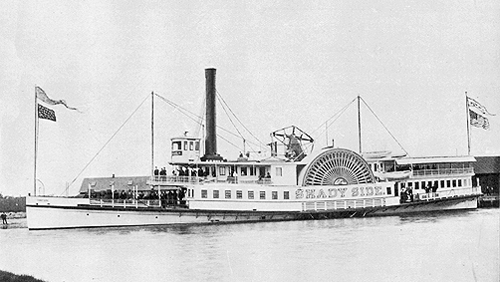
Shady Side photographed in "Picturesque Stamford, A Souvenir" (1892) published by the Gillespie Brothers

Originally, Shady Side was owned by the Morrisania Steamboat Company, and ran passengers to upper Manhattan and the Bronx by way of the East River. Later the vessel was used on routes to Stamford, Connecticut and Fort Lee, New Jersey, with stops at Shady-Side, Guttenberg, and Tilly Toodlum. Her final trip to Harlem was made on July 4, 1880, after the new elevated railroad made route uneconomical.

From the beginning, Shady Side was involved in stern competition with vessels of other companies. The Shady Side was the fastest boat of the Morrisania Steamboat Company, and frequently raced against the Sylvan Dell, which was the fastest of the Harlem Line. In 1875, as part of this sparring, the Sylvan Dell had a piece of oak strapped to her to prevent Shady Side easily passing. Captain Longstreet, superintendent of the Morrisania line, took control of Shady Side in response one morning in April 1875 and swung her around in such a way as to knock the beam off Sylvan Dell. This caused cheering from passengers on Shady Side but was condemned as dangerous horseplay by The New York Times. Later that month, Captain Longstreet's license was revoked for thirty days as a result, and the captains of both the Shady Side and Sylvan Dell—Charles G. Tennant and William Weatherwax, respectively—were censured, Tennant for remaining at the helm while Longstreet took over and Weatherwax for continuing to operate the Sylvan Dell after complaints had been raised about the beam.

In 1881, it was reported in The New York Times that the police intended to buy her for the 24th precinct, and that "she cost $83,000, was sold to the steam-boat company for $58,000, and the amount now ask [sic] for her is $38,000. It will cost about $3,500 to fit her up, and the Police flag can be transferred to her in the early Spring." The mortgage on Shady Side was foreclosed on in 1881, but she continued in service as a passenger vessel after being sold.

In 1882, Shady Side was making regular trips between Pier 3, North River and Tompkinsville, Staten Island, at half the price – five cents – of the regular ferry. The Staten Island Ferry Company complained about the under-cutting and it was found that Shady Side was being operated without a ferry license. The case went to the New York Supreme Court, which ruled against the boat's operators and enjoined them from running that route, an injunction that was re-ratified in July.

In August 1882, Shady Side was again undercutting fares on a different route, between New York and Yonkers, again charging five cents against a standard fare of twenty cents for a single ticket. The two firms that ran the Chrysteneh, the Riverdale and the Caroline A. Peene began blocking docks that the Shady Side wanted to use and casting away her lines. There were reports of passengers being assaulted, and at one point a fence and a locked gate were erected to block access to the Shady Side, over which passengers clambered. The other operators believed Shady Side must be running at a great loss and would not be able to continue, while the operator of the Shady Side, Walter H. Shupe, manager of the Columbia Line, said they were acting within their rights and that they had taken the matter to the Yonkers Police Court.

It was reported in several papers that this strategy was so popular that in September Shady Side's owners hired a larger boat, the Americus, which had a capacity of 1,500 passengers, to keep up with demand, and that the Americus was owned by a secret society numbering 800,000 members called the "Sons of Columbia", who chartered the Americus for sixty days at $160 per day.

In June 1883, Shady Side had been working on the Delaware River between Wilmington and Philadelphia, running a loss, when the captain took her from the wharf. A 'wanted' notice was run on the front page of The New York Times on the assumption she had been taken to New York.

In later service, either from 1886 or 1902, Shady Side took passengers between New York and Stamford, Connecticut, which she continued to do until at least 1910 and perhaps 1921.

=== Accidents in fog ===
The Shady Side was involved in two incidents due to fog in which another ship was damaged, causing one and assisting in the other.

In the first incident, in mid-March 1875, Shady Side struck and sank a tug boat called Mary, which was backing out of a slip between piers on the East River near Corlears Hook. George F. Townsend sued as a result and was awarded damages in May of the next year, Judge Blatchford finding that the tug was blameless and not outside the end of Jackson Street pier, whereas Shady Side was moving too fast given the fog.

On the morning of October 21, 1894, in very heavy fog, at least four ships ran aground in New York. Of these, the largest was the wooden side-wheel steamer Drew, carrying 150 passengers. Drew ran aground on Washington Point at about 7:40 a.m., tearing a hole in the starboard bow. Passengers were able to disembark by gangplank and when the tide rose, Shady Side towed Drew off the rocks and back to dock.

=== Later years ===
Around 1921, Shady Side came into the ownership of Marcus Garvey, running under the Black Star Line. Shady Side was abandoned on the mud flats at Fort Lee, New Jersey in 1922 when the Black Star Line collapsed as its owners were convicted of mail fraud.

== Later vessels ==
Another ship called the Shady Side was built in 1913 at Osborn Boat Works for Edenton Ferries, while the steamboat was still in operation. That vessel, which was unrelated, was sold to the United States Navy in 1918, given the section patrol designation SP-2079, and assigned to ferry service. She was redesignated YFB-2079 in 1920 and sank in a storm in 1925, being declared unfit for service after being raised.
