= Shade (shadow) =

Blocking of sunlight by any object

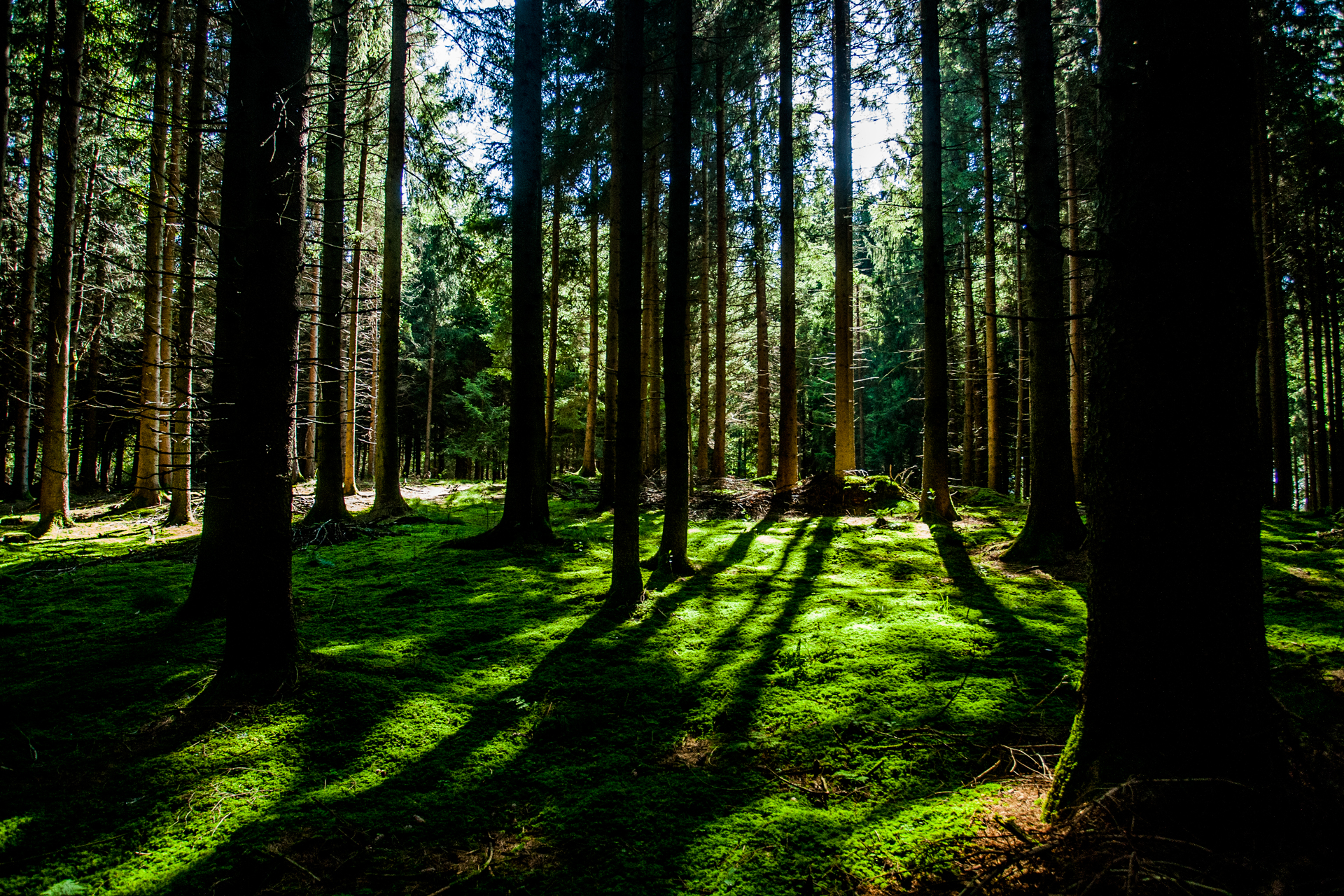
The understory of moss is in the shade caused by the trees shadow.

Shade is the blocking of sunlight (in particular direct sunshine) by any object, and also the shadow created by that object. It may refer to blocking of sunlight by a roof, a tree, an umbrella, a window shade or blind, wall, curtains, or other objects.

== History in built environment ==
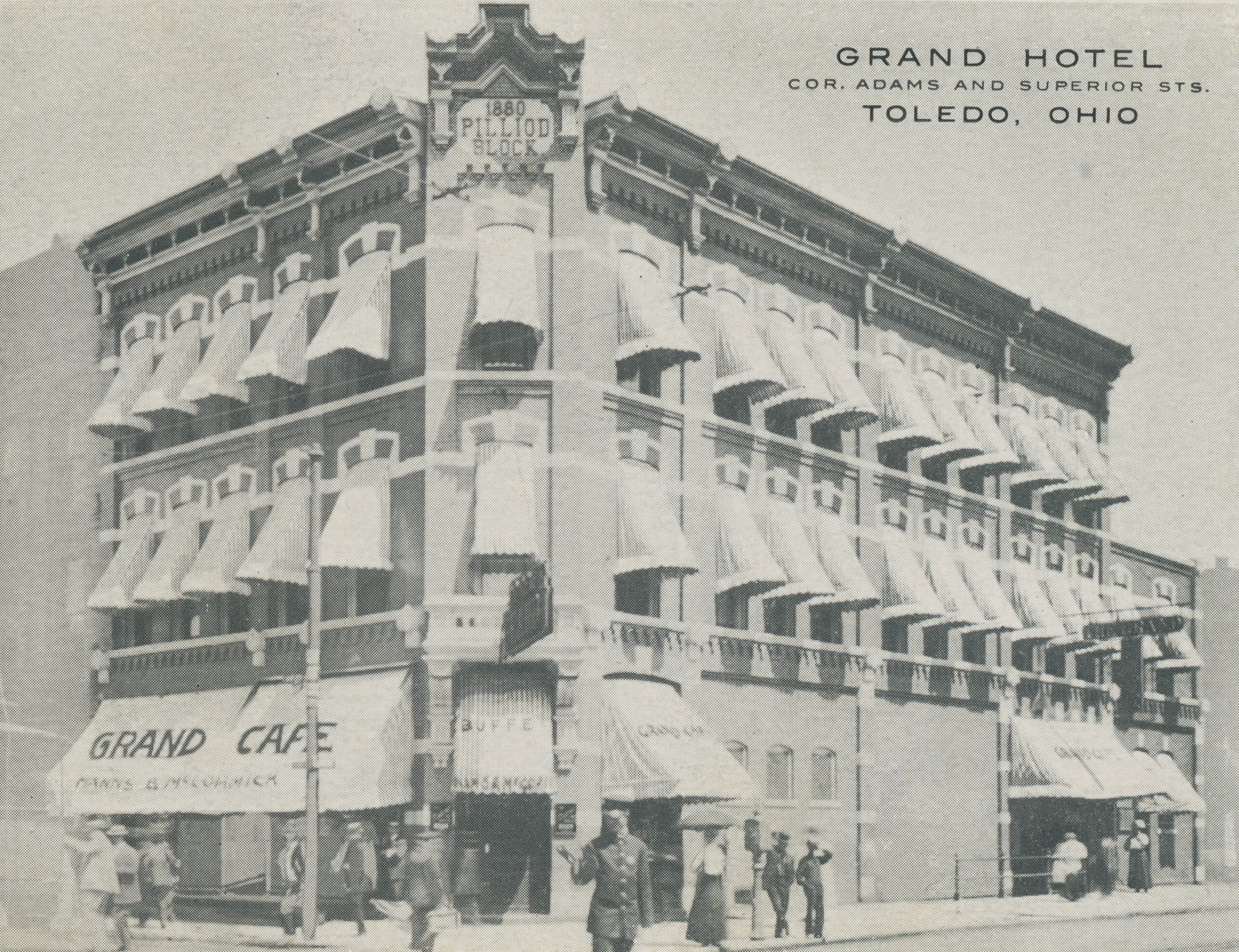

Prior to air conditioning becoming widespread, built environments in hot weather climates were designed to harness shade to mitigate heat gain.

== As a resource ==
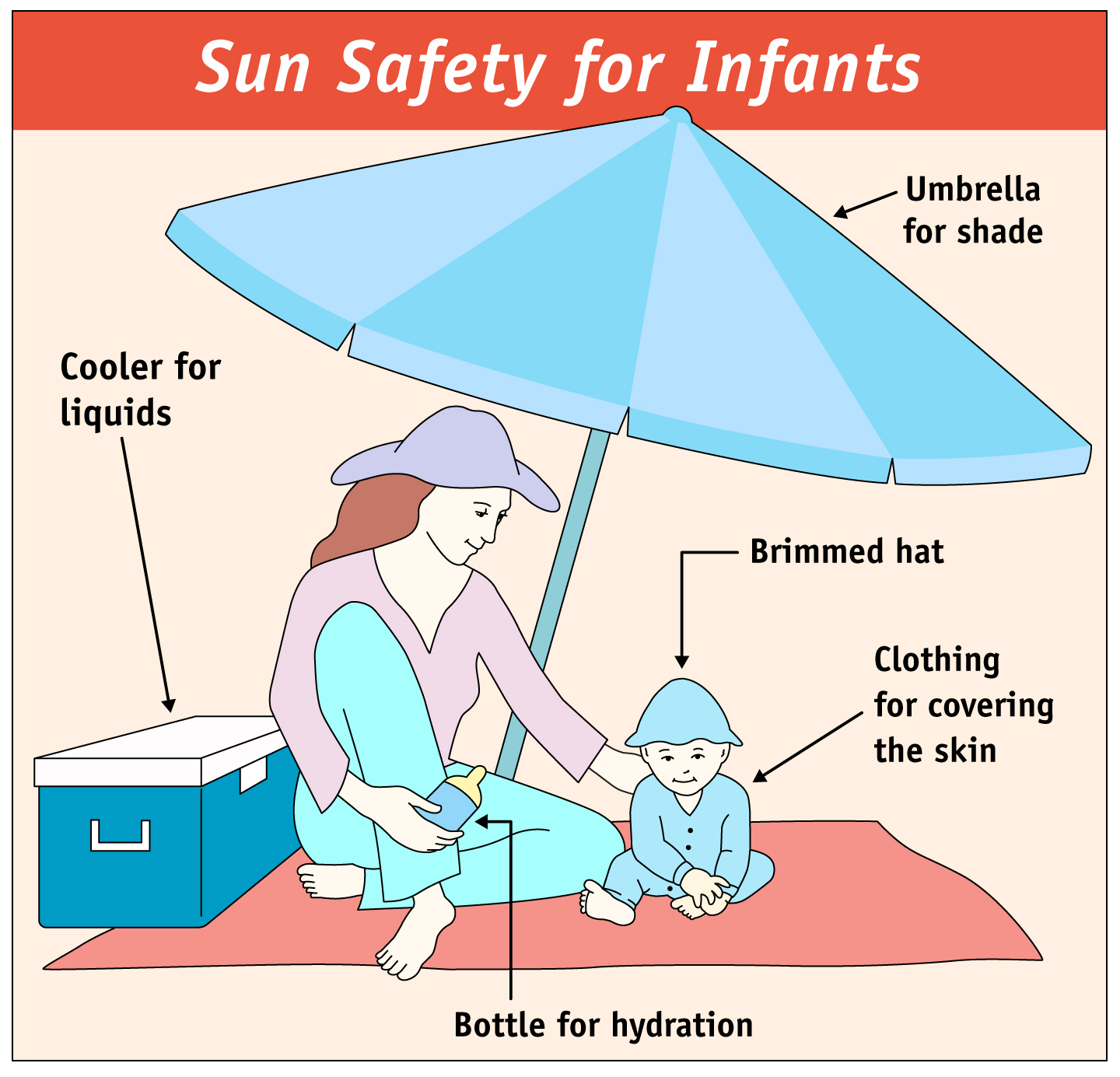
Safety from the Sun for infants

In temperate and tropical zones (most places on Earth), shade is an important issue in providing cooling and shelter from harmful heat and ultraviolet radiation emitted by the Sun.

== Plants ==
Green plants produce shade by absorbing sunlight to invest as energy in photosynthesis to produce sugar. They also actively transpire, producing an additional cooling effect.

In gardening terms, there are various types of shade:

- Full sun – more than five hours of direct sun per day.
- Part shade – two to five hours of direct sun, or all-day dappled sun (sunlight shining through open trees).
- Full shade – less than two hours of direct sun per day.

Under a dense forest canopy, light intensity can be very low. Special adaptations produce the shade tolerance that allows plants to survive in the understory. In addition, shade within a canopy can elicit shade avoidance responses whereby plants elongate their shoots in order to reach light for optimal photosynthesis.

== Politics ==
In politics shade is measured and scored and is downstream of municipal governance tree management policies and urban planning and development. In 2021, it was found that thirty million more trees are required to combat shade inequity. Shade from trees reduces urban heat island effect.

== Culture ==
Although shadows are sometimes regarded as sinister, urban planning aesthetics favour shade and beautiful streets in global terms are often regarded as those with mature tree canopy cover. Treepedia counts urban trees to estimate cover.

== See also ==
- Shade tree, a large tree that provides shade
